= Kosovo War =

1998–1999 armed conflict in the Balkans

- Part of the Yugoslav Wars
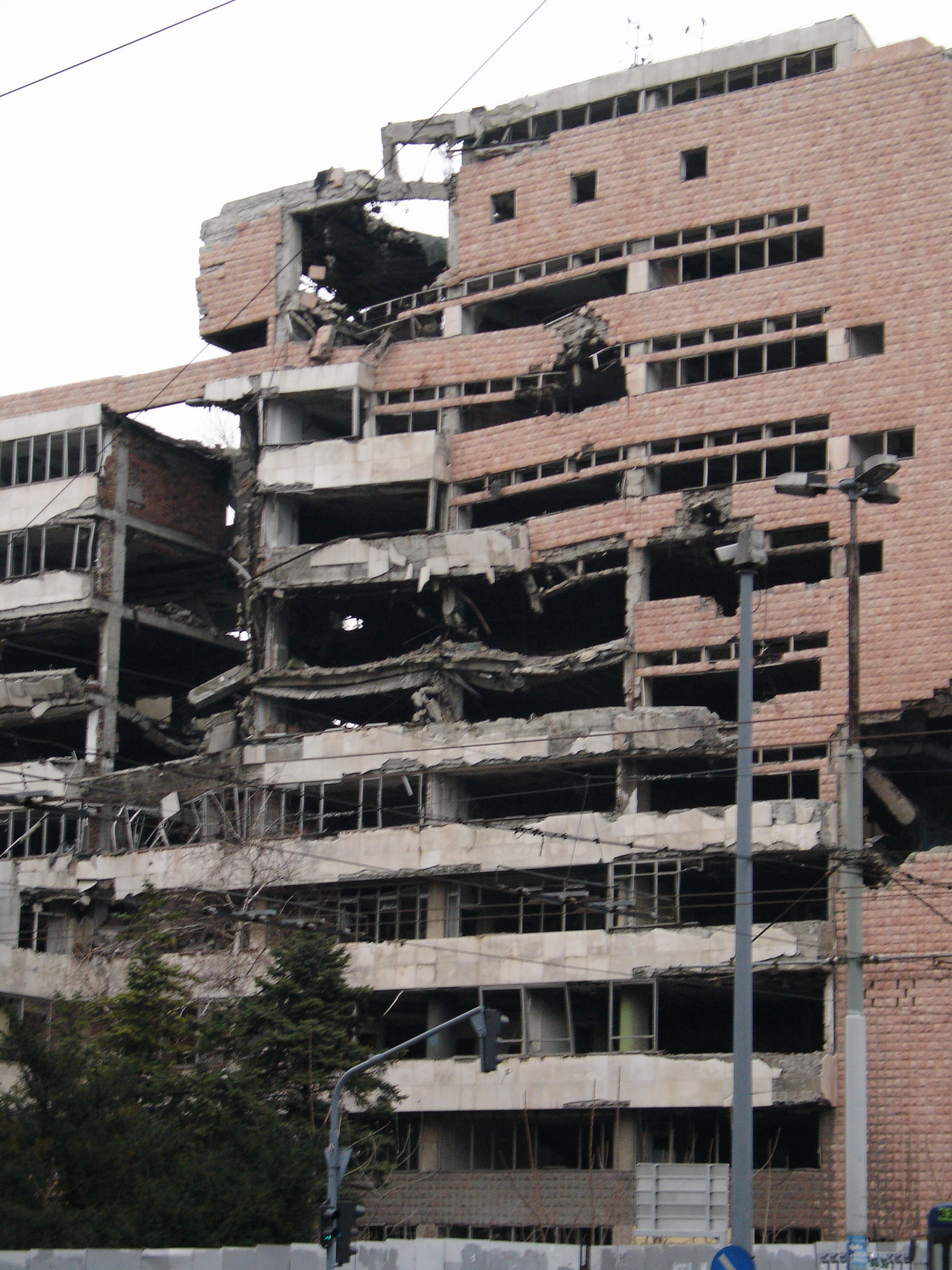
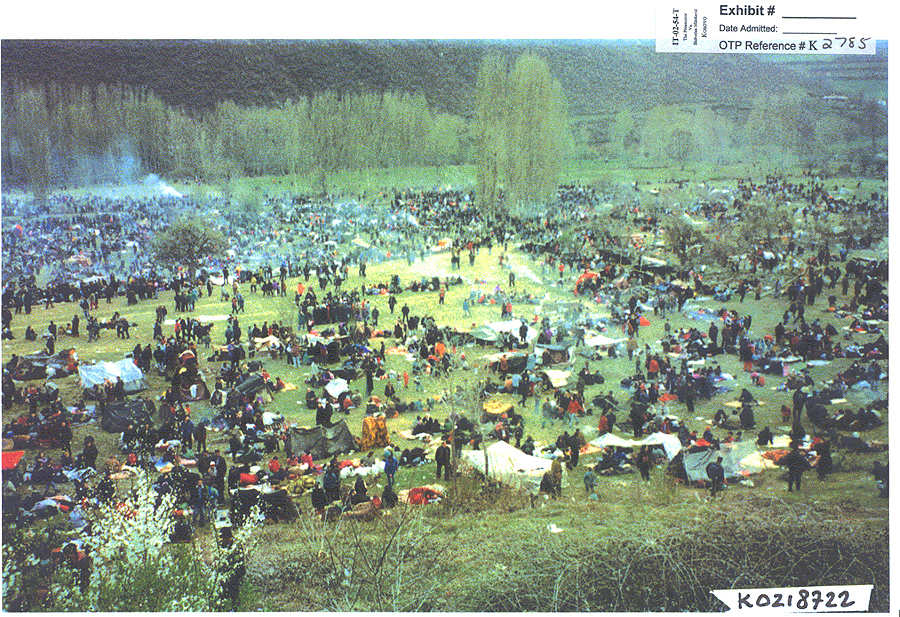
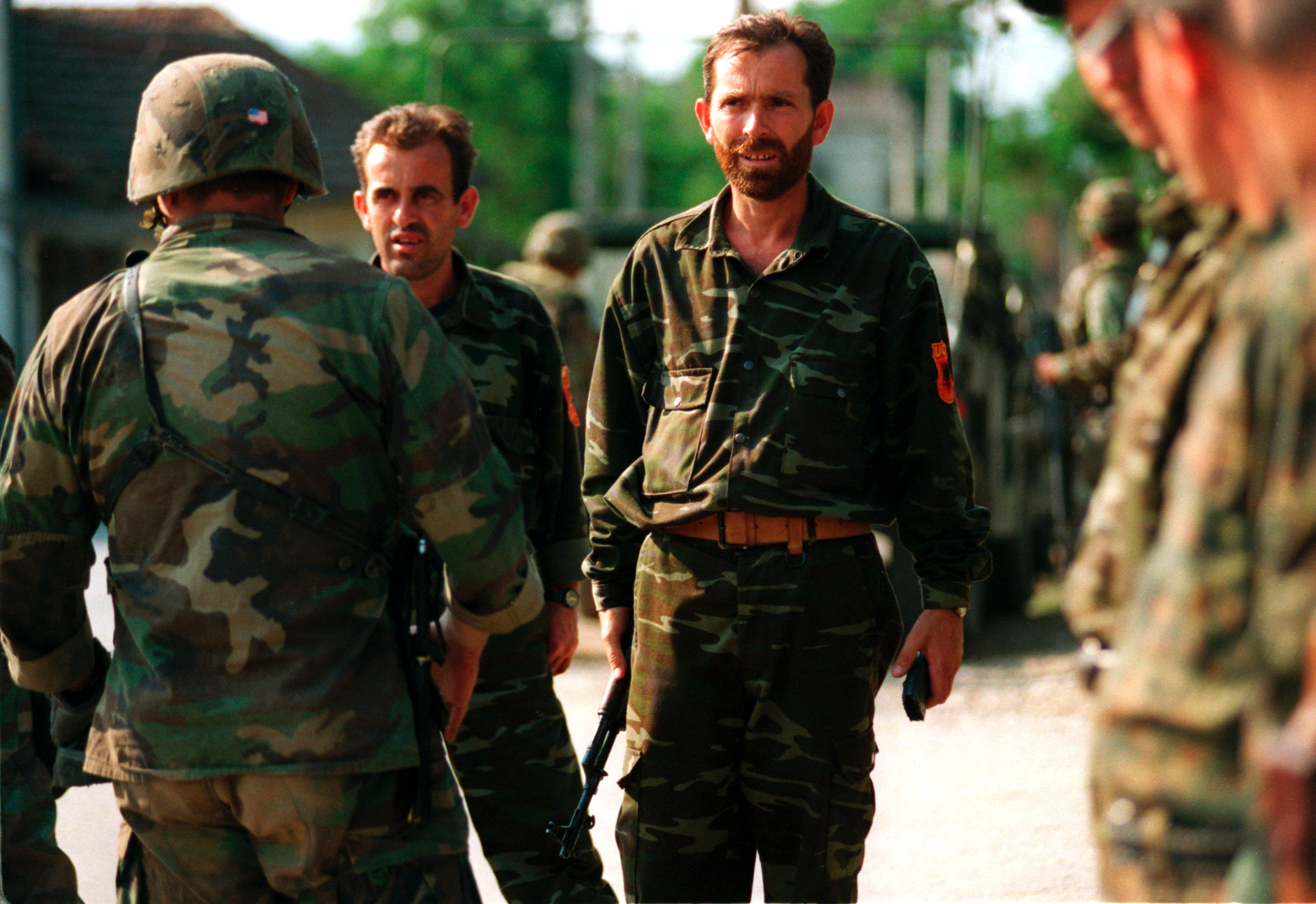
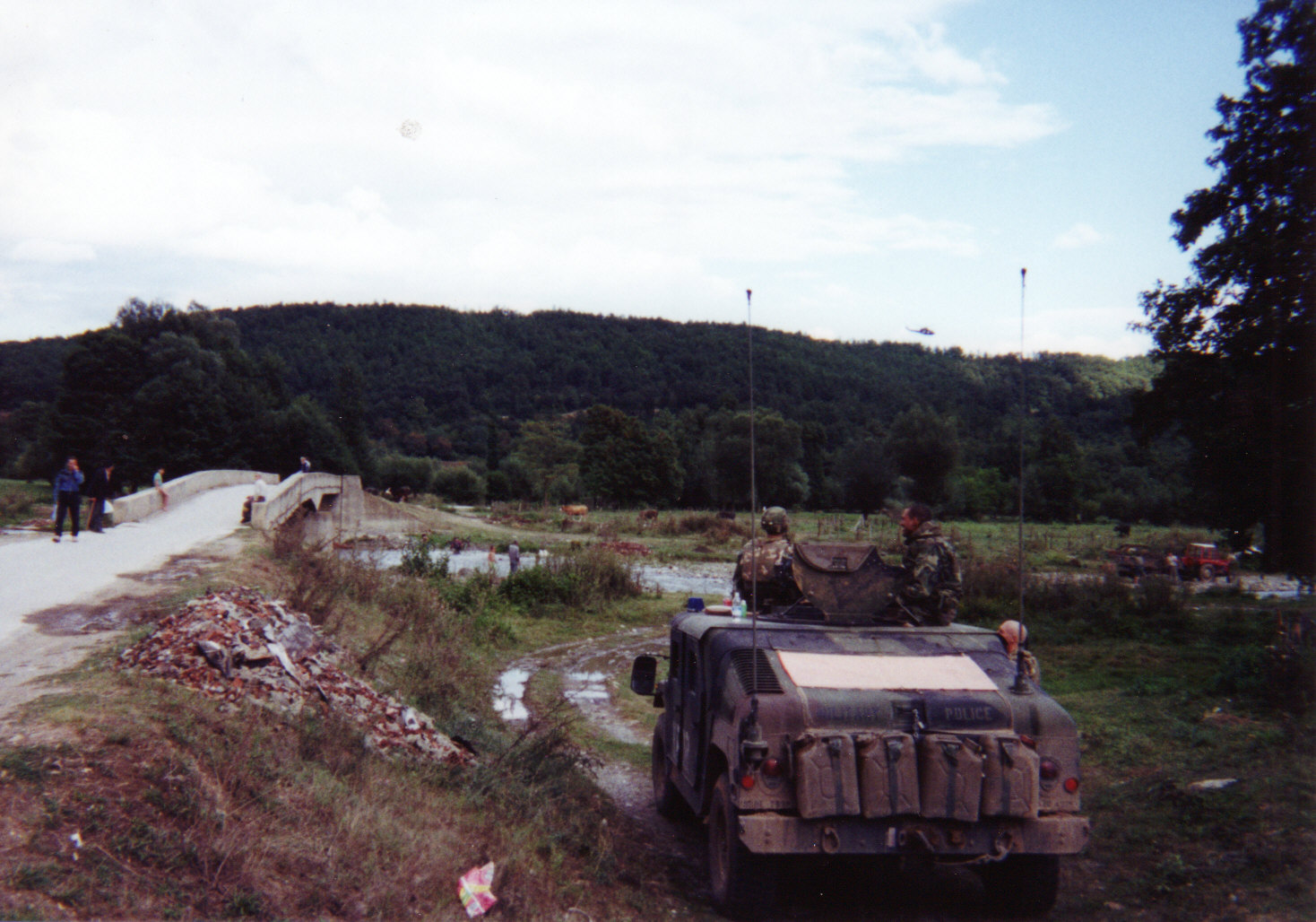
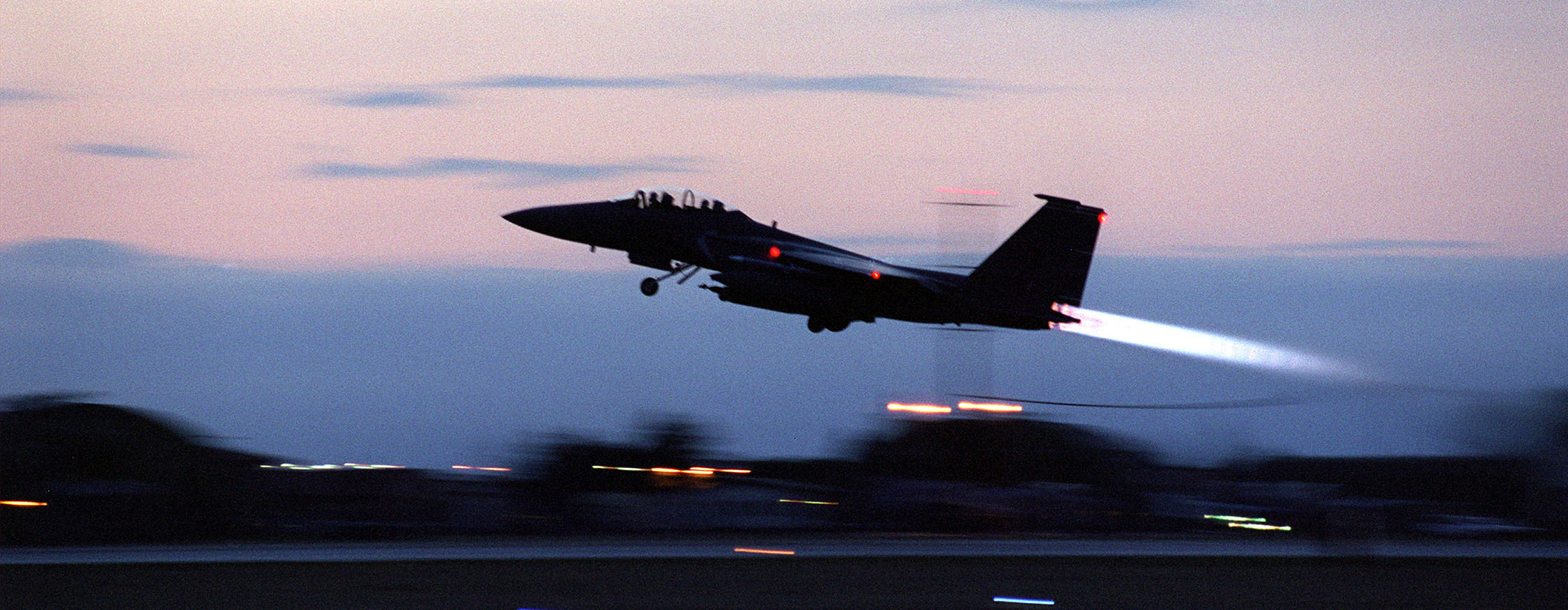
- Clockwise from top left: Yugoslav general staff headquarters damaged by NATO air strikes; Kosovo Albanian refugee camp at Bllacë; Kosovo Force soldiers near the Kosovo-Macedonia border; a USAF F-15E taking off from Aviano Air Base; Members of the Kosovo Liberation Army hand over their weapons to US Marines
Date	28 February 1998 – 11 June 1999 (1 year, 3 months and 2 weeks)
Location	Kosovo, FR Yugoslavia with incursions into Albania (OSCE report)
Result	Kumanovo Agreement
Territorial changes	No de jure changes to Yugoslav borders according to Resolution 1244, but de facto and partial de jure political and economic independence of Kosovo from FR Yugoslavia due to being placed under UN administration

Belligerents
Kosovo Liberation Army; FARK (Note: From August 1998 as the Kosovo Liberation Army as 138th Brigade.); NATO (from 24 March 1999): Belgium; Canada; Denmark; France; Germany; Italy; Netherlands; Norway; Portugal; Spain; Turkey; United Kingdom; United States	FR Yugoslavia

Commanders and leaders
Adem Jashari †; Hamëz Jashari †; Mujë Krasniqi †; Bekim Berisha †; Ahmet Krasniqi X; Hashim Thaçi; Agim Çeku; Sylejman Selimi; Ramush Haradinaj; Agim Ramadani †; Sali Çekaj †; Ismet Asllani †; (NATO) (United States) Wesley Clark	(Serbia and Montenegro) Slobodan Milošević; (Serbia and Montenegro) Pavle Bulatović; (Serbia and Montenegro) Dragoljub Ojdanić; (Serbia and Montenegro) Vlastimir Đorđević; (Serbia and Montenegro) Sreten Lukić; (Serbia and Montenegro) Nebojša Pavković; (Serbia and Montenegro) Vladimir Lazarević; (Serbia and Montenegro) Goran Radosavljević

Strength
15,000–30,000 insurgents: Unknown number of foreign volunteers; (NATO) c. 80 aircraft (Operation Eagle Eye); (NATO) 1,031 aircraft (Operation Allied Force); (NATO) 30+ warships and submarines	(Federal Republic of Yugoslavia) 85,000–114,000 soldiers (including 40,000 in and around Kosovo); (Federal Republic of Yugoslavia) 20,000 policemen; (Federal Republic of Yugoslavia) 100 SAM sites; (Federal Republic of Yugoslavia) 1,400 artillery pieces (both ground & air defence); (Federal Republic of Yugoslavia) 240 aircraft; (Federal Republic of Yugoslavia) 2,032 armoured vehicles & tanks; Unknown number of Serbian paramilitary units (Jackals, Škorpioni, White Eagles); Several hundred Russian volunteers; Unknown number of Ukrainian volunteers

Casualties and losses
1,500–2,131 insurgents killed; (United States) 2 killed (non-combat) and 3 captured; (United States) 2 aircraft shot down and 3 damaged; (United States) Two AH-64 Apaches and an AV-8B Harrier crashed (non-combat); (NATO) 47 UAVs shot down	Caused by NATO: (Federal Republic of Yugoslavia) 276–1,200 killed (Note: Serbia claims that 1,008 Yugoslav soldiers and policemen were killed by NATO bombing. NATO initially claimed that 5,000 Yugoslav servicemen had been killed and 10,000 had been wounded during the NATO air campaign. NATO has since revised this estimation to 1,200 Yugoslav soldiers and policemen killed. According to the Humanitarian Law Center, the NATO air campaign killed 276 member of Serbian police and military forces.); (Federal Republic of Yugoslavia) 14 tanks, 18 APCs, 20 artillery pieces and 121 aircraft and helicopters destroyed; Caused by KLA: (Federal Republic of Yugoslavia) 808 killed (HLC figures); (Federal Republic of Yugoslavia) 26 tanks destroyed 4–20 Russian volunteers killed
- Total: c. 13,548 fighters and civilians of all ethnicities dead (Albania) 8,676 to 9,269 Kosovar Albanian civilians killed or missing (Albania) 90% of Kosovar Albanians displaced during the war (848,000–863,000 expelled from Kosovo (Albania) 590,000 Kosovar Albanians displaced within Kosovo); 1,641 non-Albanian civilians killed or missing, including 1,196 ethnic Serbs, and 445 Romani and others / (Albania) Civilian deaths caused by NATO bombing: 489–528 (per Human Rights Watch) or 454 (per HLC), also includes (China) 3 Chinese journalists killed Aftermath: 113,128 to 200,000+ Kosovo Serbs, Romani, and other non-Albanian civilians displaced

The Kosovo War (Albanian: Lufta e Kosovës; Serbian: Косовски рат, Kosovski rat) was an armed conflict in Kosovo that lasted from 28 February 1998 until 11 June 1999. It was fought between the forces of the Federal Republic of Yugoslavia (FRY), which controlled Kosovo before the war, and the Kosovo Albanian separatist militia known as the Kosovo Liberation Army (KLA). The conflict ended when the North Atlantic Treaty Organization (NATO) intervened by beginning air strikes in March 1999, which resulted in Yugoslav forces withdrawing from Kosovo.

The KLA was formed in the early 1990s to fight against the discrimination of ethnic Albanians and the repression of political dissent by the Serbian authorities, which started after the suppression of Kosovo's autonomy and other discriminatory policies against Albanians by Serbian leader Slobodan Milošević in 1989. The KLA initiated its first campaign in 1995, after Kosovo's case was left out of the Dayton Agreement and it had become clear that President Rugova's strategy of peaceful resistance had failed to bring Kosovo onto the international agenda. In June 1996, the group claimed responsibility for acts of sabotage targeting Kosovo police stations, during the Kosovo Insurgency. In 1997, the organization acquired a large quantity of arms through weapons smuggling from Albania, following a rebellion in which weapons were looted from the country's police and army posts. In early 1998, KLA attacks targeting Yugoslav authorities in Kosovo resulted in an increased presence of Serb paramilitaries and regular forces who subsequently began pursuing a campaign of retribution targeting KLA sympathisers and political opponents; this campaign killed 1,500 to 2,000 civilians and KLA combatants, and had displaced 370,000 Kosovar Albanians by March 1999.

On 20 March 1999, Yugoslav forces began a massive campaign of repression and expulsions of Kosovar Albanians following the withdrawal of the OSCE Kosovo Verification Mission (KVM) and the failure of the proposed Rambouillet Agreement. In response to this, NATO intervened with an aerial bombing campaign that began on 24 March, justifying it on humanitarian grounds. The war ended with the Kumanovo Agreement, signed on 9 June 1999, with Yugoslav and Serb forces agreeing to withdraw from Kosovo to make way for an international presence. NATO forces entered Kosovo on June 12. The NATO bombing campaign has remained controversial. It did not gain the approval of the UN Security Council and it caused at least 488 Yugoslav civilian deaths, including substantial deaths of Kosovar refugees.

In 2001, a UN administered Supreme Court based in Kosovo found that there had been a systematic campaign of terror, including murders, rapes, arsons and severe maltreatments against the Albanian population, and that Yugoslav troops had tried to force them out of Kosovo, but not to eradicate them, and therefore it was not genocide. After the war, a list was compiled which documented that over 13,500 people were killed or went missing during the two-year conflict. The Yugoslav and Serb forces caused the displacement of between 1.2 million and 1.45 million Kosovo Albanians. After the war, around 200,000 Serbs, Romani, and other non-Albanians fled Kosovo and there were reports of abuse directed against the remaining civilians.

The Kosovo Liberation Army disbanded soon after the end of the war, with some of its members going on to fight for the UÇPMB in the Preševo Valley, some joining the National Liberation Army (NLA) and Albanian National Army (ANA) during the armed ethnic conflict in Macedonia, while others went on to form the Kosovo Police.

The International Criminal Tribunal for the former Yugoslavia (ICTY) convicted six Serb/Yugoslav officials and one Albanian commander for war crimes.

== Background ==
The modern Albanian-Serbian conflict has its roots in the expulsion of Albanians in 1877–1878 from areas that were incorporated into the Principality of Serbia. Muslim Albanians residing in the Sanjak of Niš were quickly expelled after Ottomans had lost control of the region. Modern estimates put the number of expelled Albanians at 50,000–130,000 Albanian refugees. As a result, some Albanian refugees who settled in Kosovo retaliated by attacking the local Serb population. From 1830 to 1876, there had also been a forced migration of up to 150,000 Albanians from the Principality. The conflict became more intense at the end of the 19th century, and in 1901 there were massacres of Serbs by Albanians in Ibarski Kolašin using weapons not handed back to the Ottomans following the Greco-Turkish War of 1897.

Tensions between the Serbian and Albanian communities in Kosovo simmered throughout the 20th century and occasionally erupted into major violence, particularly during the First Balkan War (1912–1913), World War I (1914–1918), and World War II (1939–1945). The Albanian revolt of 1912 in Kosovo resulted in the Ottoman Empire agreeing to the creation of an Albanian quasi-state, but Ottoman forces were soon driven out by opportunistic Bulgarian, Serbian and Montenegrin troops. In the ensuing Balkan Wars, at least 50,000 Albanians were massacred in the present-day territory of Kosovo by the Serbian regular army and irregular Komitadjis with the intention of manipulating population statistics before the borders of Albania were recognized during the London Conference of 1912–1913, after the latter proposed the drawing of the borders of Albania based on ethnic statistics. Multiple historians, scholars, and contemporary accounts refer to or characterize the massacres as: localized genocide, extermination, genocide of Albanians or part of the wider genocide against Muslims.

After World War I Kosovo was incorporated into the Serb-dominated Kingdom of Yugoslavia despite the Albanian community's demands for union with Albania. Albanian rebels started the Drenica-Dukagjin Uprisings, which ended with the rebellion being crushed after the fall of the government of Fan Noli in Albania in December 1924 and the subsequent withdrawal of support for the Committee for the National Defence of Kosovo by President Zog. Between 1918 and 1939, Yugoslavia expelled hundreds of thousands of Albanians and promoted the settlement of mostly Serb colonists in the region, while Albanian language schools were prohibited. After the Axis invasion of Yugoslavia in 1941, most of Kosovo was assigned to Italian-controlled Albania, with the rest being controlled by Germany and Bulgaria. During the occupation, Albanian collaborators persecuted Serb and Montenegrin settlers, with thousands killed and between 70,000 and 100,000 expelled from Kosovo or sent to concentration camps in order to Albanianize the province. The return of the expelled colonists was made next to impossible by a decree from Yugoslav leader Josip Broz Tito, followed by a new law in August 1945, which disallowed the return of colonists who had taken land from Albanian peasants.

=== Kosovo in Tito's Yugoslavia (1945–1980) ===
The end of World War II saw Kosovo returning to Yugoslav control. The new socialist government under Josip Broz Tito systematically suppressed nationalism among the ethnic groups throughout Yugoslavia, and established six republics (Slovenia, Croatia, Serbia, Montenegro, Macedonia and Bosnia-Herzegovina) as constituent parts of the Yugoslav federation. Tito diluted the power of Serbia – the largest and most populous republic – by establishing autonomous governments in the Serbian province of Vojvodina in the north and Kosovo in the south. Until 1963, the region was named the Autonomous Region of Kosovo and Metohija and in 1968 it was renamed to the Socialist Autonomous Province of Kosovo.

The period of 1948–1963 in Kosovo was characterized by a brutal crackdown against Albanian nationalists by Aleksandar Ranković and his secret police (the UDBA). In 1955, a state of emergency was declared in order to quell unrest that had purportedly been instigated by terror groups from Albania. Following Ranković's ouster in 1966, Tito and his League of Communists Party granted more powers to republics and attempted to improve the political, social and economic situation in Kosovo. In November 1968, large-scale demonstrations took place in Kosovo which were quelled by Yugoslav forces, precipitated by Albanian demands for separate republics in Kosovo and Macedonia. Albanian students and intellectuals pushed for an Albanian-language university and greater representative powers for Albanians in both the Serbian and Yugoslav state bodies.

The University of Pristina was established as an independent institution in 1970, ending a long period when the institution had been run as an outpost of the University of Belgrade. The lack of Albanian-language educational materials in Yugoslavia hampered Albanian education in Kosovo, so an agreement was struck with Albania itself to supply textbooks.

In 1969 the Serbian Orthodox Church ordered its clergy to compile data on the ongoing problems of Serbs in Kosovo, seeking to pressure the government in Belgrade to do more to protect the interests of Serbs there.

In 1974 Kosovo's political status improved further when a new Yugoslav constitution granted an expanded set of political rights. Along with Vojvodina, Kosovo was declared a province and gained many of the powers of a fully-fledged republic: a seat on the federal presidency and its own assembly, police force and national bank. While trying to balance the interests of Albanians and Serbs, this effectively stratified both communities and prompted Serb fears of Kosovo seceding from Yugoslavia. Student demonstrations continued throughout the 1970s, resulting in the imprisonment of many members of the Albanian National Liberation Movement, including Adem Demaçi. The political and administrative changes that began in 1968 resulted in Kosovo Albanians securing complete control over the province's political, social and cultural issues as well as growing ties between Kosovo and Albania. However, by 1980, economic impoverishment became the catalyst for further unrest.

=== After the death of Tito (1980–1989) ===
Provincial power was still exercised by the League of Communists of Kosovo, but now devolved mainly to ethnic Albanian communists. Tito's death on 4 May 1980 ushered in a long period of political instability, worsened by growing economic crisis and nationalist unrest. The first major outbreak occurred in Kosovo's main city, Pristina, when a protest of University of Pristina students over long queues in their university canteen rapidly escalated and in late March and early April 1981 spread throughout Kosovo, causing mass demonstrations in several towns, the 1981 protests in Kosovo. The disturbances were quelled by the Presidency of Yugoslavia proclaiming a state of emergency, sending in riot police and the army, which resulted in numerous casualties.

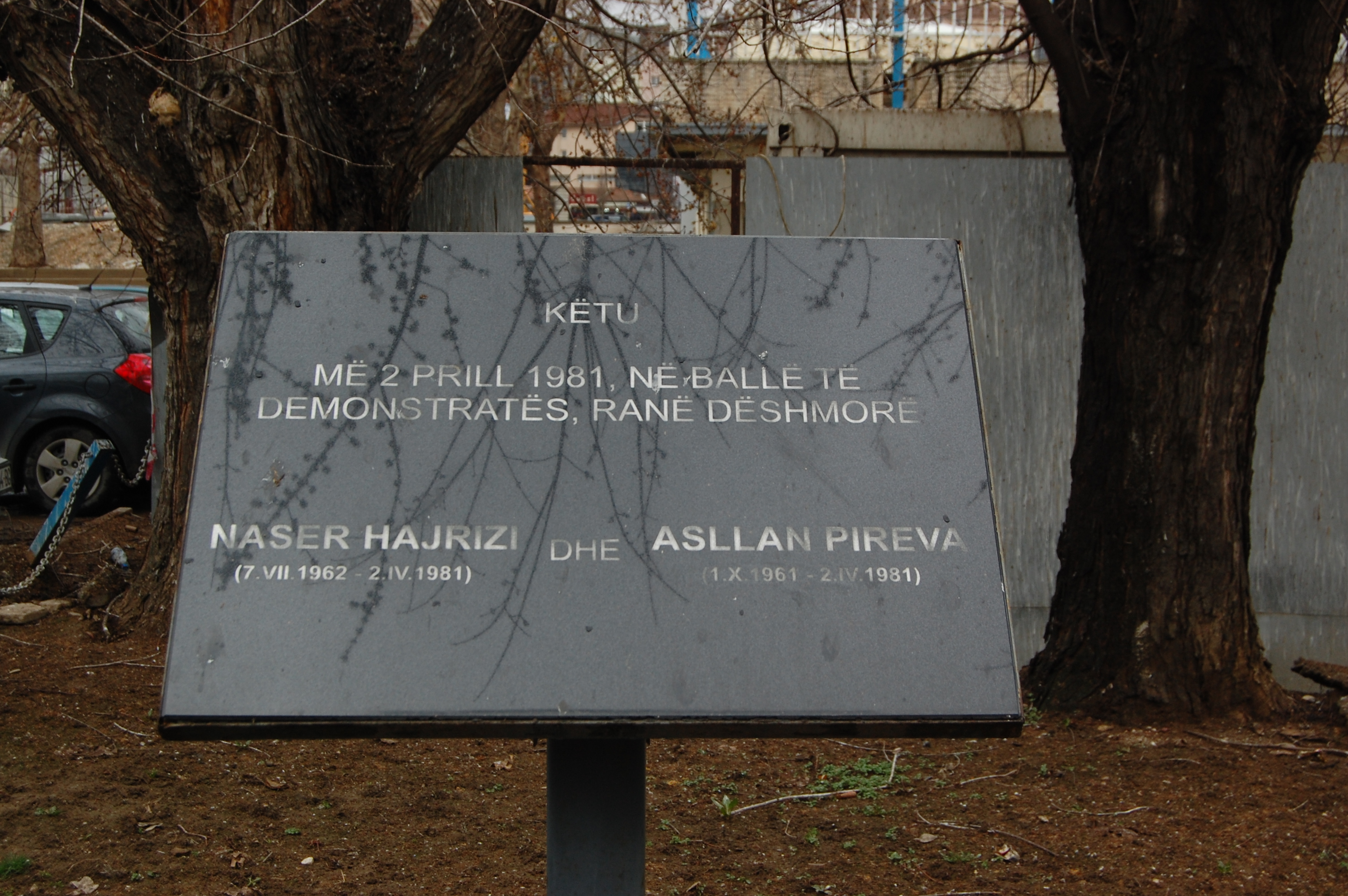
Memorial plaque in Pristina, dedicated to two protesters who were killed in the 1981 protests, demanding more autonomy for Kosovo

In 1981 it was reported that some 4,000 Serbs moved from Kosovo to central Serbia after the Kosovo Albanian riots in March that resulted in several Serb deaths and the desecration of Serbian Orthodox architecture and graveyards. Serbia reacted with a plan to reduce the power of Albanians in the province and a propaganda campaign that claimed Serbs were being pushed out of the province primarily by the growing Albanian population, rather than the bad state of the economy. 33 nationalist formations were dismantled by Yugoslav police, who sentenced some 280 people (800 fined, 100 under investigation) and seized arms caches and propaganda material. Albanian leaders of Kosovo maintained that Serbs were leaving mainly because of the poor economy. The worsening state of Kosovo's economy made the province a poor choice for Serbs seeking work. Albanians, as well as Serbs, tended to favor their compatriots when hiring new employees, but the number of jobs was too few for the population. Kosovo was the poorest entity of Yugoslavia: the average per capita income was $795, compared with the national average of $2,635. Due to its comparative poverty it received substantial amounts of Yugoslav development money, leading to quarrels amongst the republics regarding its quantity and utilization.

In February 1982 a group of priests from Serbia proper petitioned their bishops to ask "why the Serbian Church is silent" and why it did not campaign against "the destruction, arson and sacrilege of the holy shrines of Kosovo". In 1985, two Albanian farmers were falsely accused for the Đorđe Martinović incident, which turned into a cause célèbre in Serbian politics and fueled hatred towards Albanians. In 1987, Aziz Kelmendi, an ethnic-Albanian recruit in the Yugoslav Army (JNA) killed four fellow soldiers in a mass shooting in JNA barracks, with only one of them being an ethnic Serb. Serbian media blamed Albanian nationalism for the event and in response, Yugoslavia sent 400 federal police officers to Kosovo. It was against this tense background that the Serbian Academy of Sciences and Arts (SANU) conducted a survey of Serbs who had left Kosovo in 1985 and 1986, which concluded that a considerable number had left under pressure from Albanians.

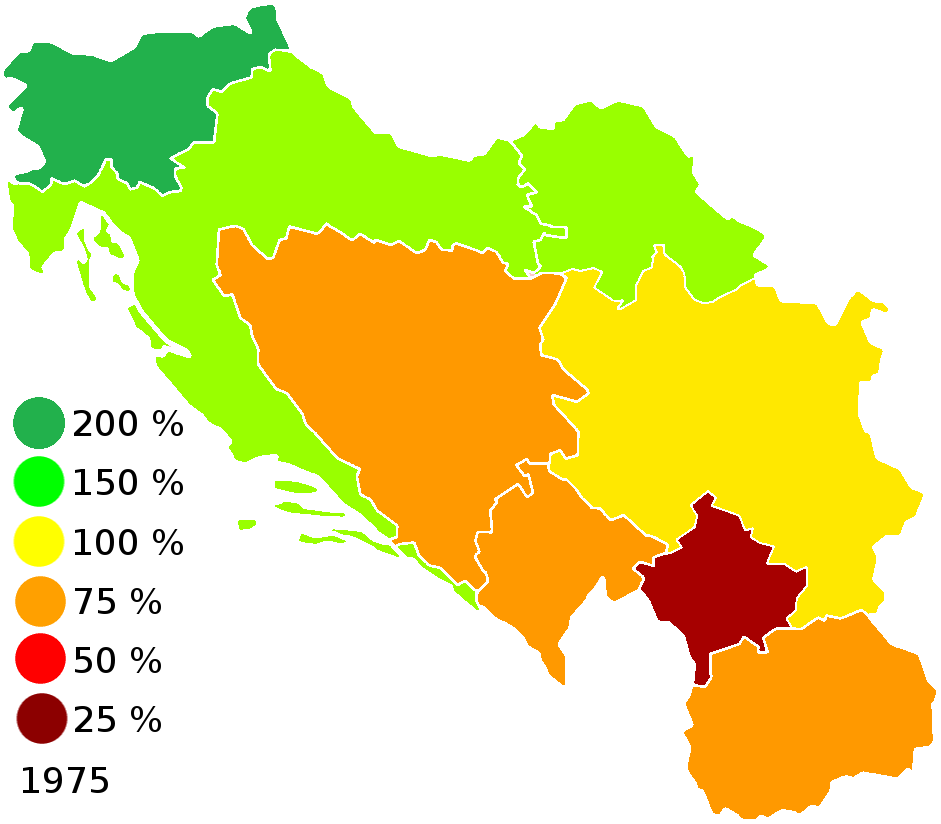
SAP Kosovo was the poorest entity of SFR Yugoslavia. The deteriorating economic situation became a catalyst for increased inter-ethnic tensions in the 1980s.

The so-called SANU Memorandum, leaked in September 1986, was a draft document that focused on the political difficulties facing Serbs in Yugoslavia, pointing to Tito's deliberate hobbling of Serbia's power and the difficulties faced by Serbs outside Serbia proper. It paid special attention to Kosovo, arguing that the Kosovo Serbs were being subjected to "physical, political, legal and cultural genocide" in an "open and total war" that had been ongoing since the spring of 1981. It claimed that Kosovo's status in 1986 was a worse historical defeat for the Serbs than any event since liberation from the Ottomans in 1804, thus ranking it above such catastrophes as the World war occupations. The Memorandum's authors claimed that 200,000 Serbs had moved out of the province over the previous 20 years and warned that there would soon be none left "unless things changed radically." The remedy, according to the Memorandum, was for "genuine security and unambiguous equality for all peoples living in Kosovo and Metohija [to be] established" and "objective and permanent conditions for the return of the expelled [Serbian] nation [to be] created." It concluded that "Serbia must not be passive and wait and see what the others will say, as it has done so often in the past." The SANU Memorandum provoked split reactions: Albanians saw it as a call for Serbian supremacy at the local level, claiming the Serb emigrants had left Kosovo for economic reasons, while the Slovenes and Croats saw a threat in the call for a more assertive Serbia. Serbs were divided: many welcomed it, while the Communist old guard strongly attacked its message. One of those who denounced it was Serbian Communist Party official Slobodan Milošević.

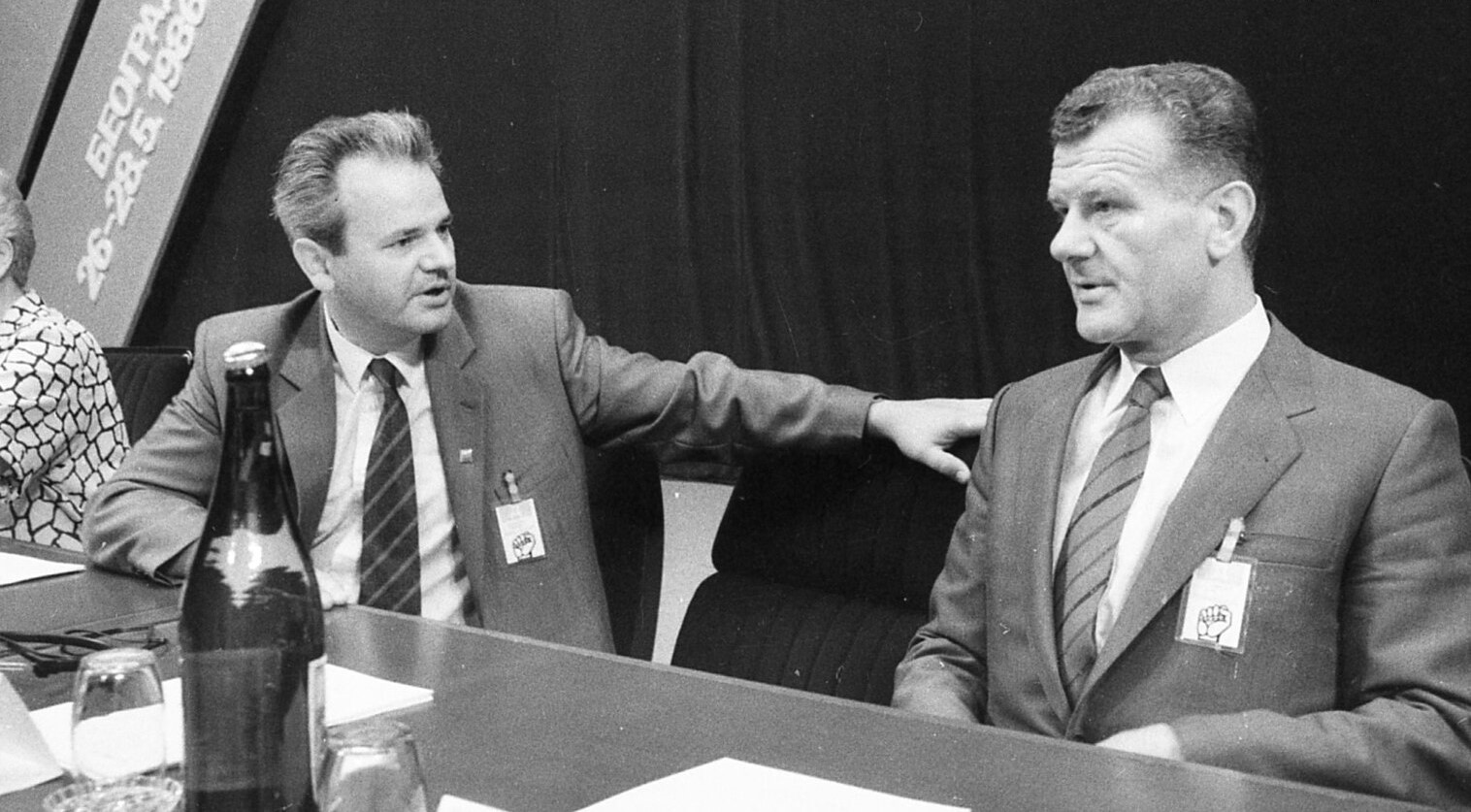
Slobodan Milošević and Ivan Stambolić's 1987 visit to Kosovo marked the beginning of Milošević's rise to the Presidency, after he made the remarks "No one will beat you again," to a crowd of Serb protesters.

In April 1987, Serbian President Ivan Stambolić and Slobodan Milošević visited Kosovo with the intention of reducing tensions in the region. A Serb nationalist crowd had gathered near the hall where Milošević was supposed to deliver his speech in Kosovo Polje. The crowd tried to break through the police cordon that was providing security for the gathering, and after clashing with the police; they chanted that Albanian policemen were beating them. Informed of the situation, Milošević walked out of the building and addressed the protesters, telling them "No one will beat you again". He further called upon the crowd to resist the Albanian pressure to leave Kosovo. This speech marked the beginning of Milošević's use of nationalism to gain power, and he was appointed President of the Presidency of Serbia in May 1989.

In November 1988 Kosovo's head of the provincial committee was arrested. In March 1989 Milošević announced an "anti-bureaucratic revolution" in Kosovo and Vojvodina, curtailing their autonomy as well as imposing a curfew and a state of emergency in Kosovo due to violent demonstrations, resulting in 24 deaths (including two policemen). Milošević and his government claimed that the constitutional changes were necessary to protect Kosovo's remaining Serbs against harassment from the Albanian majority.

=== Constitutional amendments (1989–94) ===
On 17 November 1988 Kaqusha Jashari and Azem Vllasi were forced to resign from the leadership of the League of Communists of Kosovo (LCK). In early 1989 the Serbian Assembly proposed amendments to the Constitution of Serbia that would remove the word "Socialist" from the Serbian Republic's title, establish multi-party elections, remove the independence of institutions of the autonomous provinces such as Kosovo and rename Kosovo as the Autonomous Province of Kosovo and Metohija. In February Kosovar Albanians demonstrated in large numbers against the proposal, emboldened by striking miners. Serbs in Belgrade protested against the Kosovo Albanians' separatism. On 3 March 1989 the Presidency of Yugoslavia imposed special measures assigning responsibility for public security to the federal government. On 23 March the Assembly of Kosovo voted to accept the proposed amendments although most Albanian delegates abstained. In early 1990 Kosovar Albanians held mass demonstrations against the special measures, which were lifted on 18 April 1990, when responsibility for public security was again assigned to Serbia.

On 26 June 1990, Serbian authorities barred access to the building of the Kosovo Assembly, citing special circumstances. On 2 July 1990, 114 ethnic Albanian delegates of the 180-member Kosovo Assembly gathered in front of the closed building and declared Kosovo an independent republic within Yugoslavia. On 5 July the Serbian Assembly dissolved the Kosovo Assembly. Serbia also dissolved the provincial executive council and assumed full and direct control of the province. Serbia took over management of Kosovo's principal Albanian-language media, halting Albanian-language broadcasts. On 4 September 1990 Kosovar Albanians observed a 24-hour general strike, virtually shutting down the province. On 5 August 1991, the Serbian Assembly suspended the main Albanian-language daily newspaper, Rilindja, declaring its journalism unconstitutional.

On 7 September 1990, the Constitution of Kosovo was promulgated by Albanian members of the disbanded Assembly of Kosovo. Milošević responded by ordering the arrest of the deputies that participated in the meeting. The new controversial Serbian Constitution was promulgated on 28 September 1990. In September 1991, Kosovar Albanians held an unofficial referendum in which they voted overwhelmingly for independence. On 24 May 1992 Kosovar Albanians held unofficial elections for an assembly and president of the Republic of Kosovo and elected Ibrahim Rugova as president.

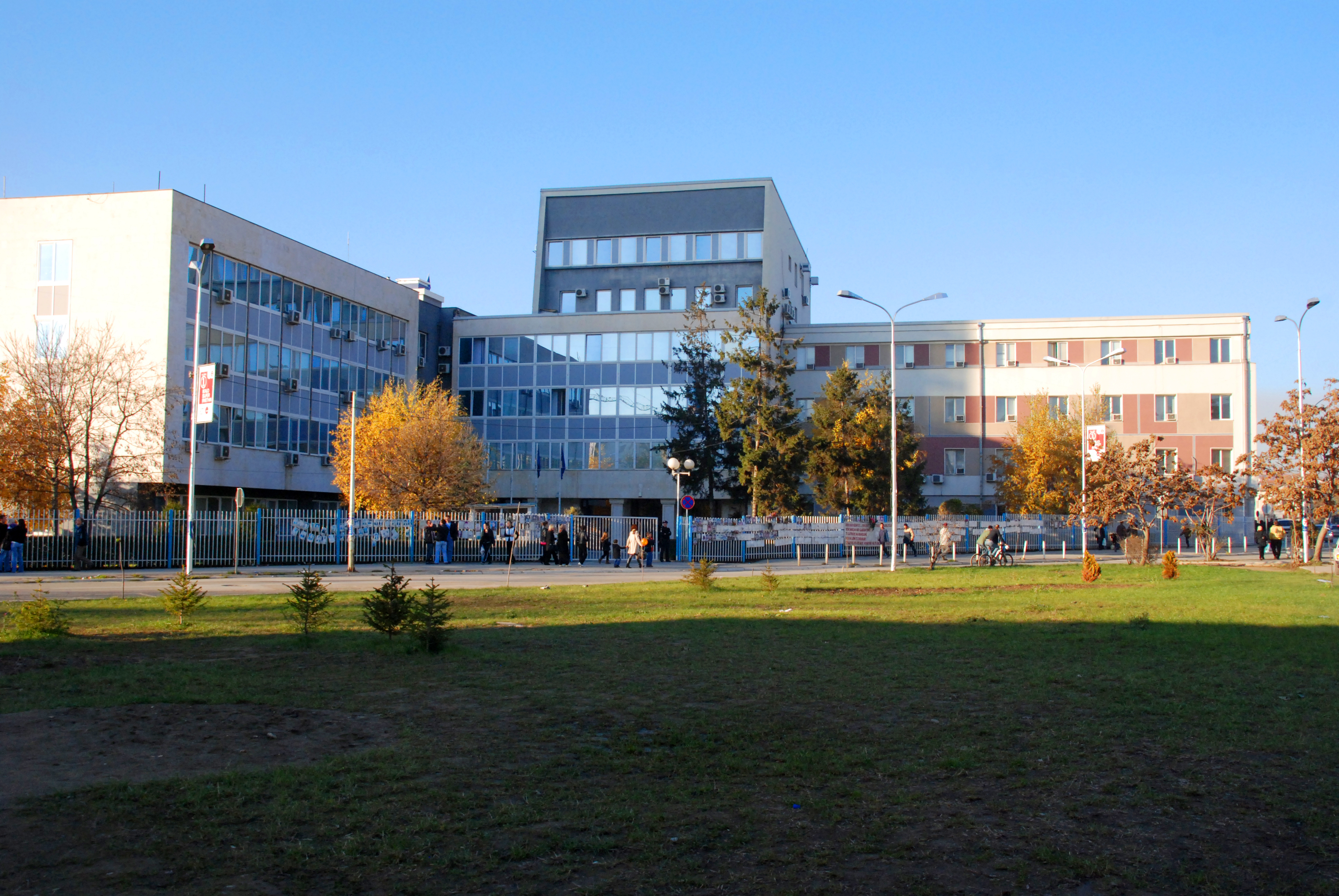
114 delegates of the SAP Kosovo Assembly gathered in front of the closed Assembly building on July 2, 1990, and declared Kosovo an independent Republic within Yugoslavia.

During this time, the Republic of Kosova started to establish parallel institutions, which were not recognized by Serbia. The presence of Serbian security structures in Kosovo increased considerably and Kosovo was put into constant curfews. Hundreds of thousands of ethnic Albanians were fired from government and state-run institutions. By 1990 most Albanian schools were closed and the Serbian government required Albanian teachers to sign loyalty oaths in order to remain employed, effectively asking them to recognize Serbia, and not the Republic of Kosova as their country, which the vast majority refused to sign. By 1991 all Albanian schoolteachers and academic staff had been dismissed and a parallel education system was established by the government of the Republic of Kosova, using donated private homes as classrooms. 350,000 Albanians emigrated out of the region due to economic and social pressures over the next seven years, and the Milosevic regime encouraged Serb settlement in the region. United Nations Special Rapporteur Tadeusz Mazowiecki reported on 26 February 1993 that the police had intensified their repression of the Albanian population since 1990, including depriving them of their basic rights, destroying their education system, and conducting large numbers of political dismissals of civil servants.

Milosevic ordered the abolishment of the Academy of Sciences and Arts in Kosovo, Albanian street names were changed to Serbian ones, Serbs were allowed to enter the University of Pristina and therefore received preferential treatment, and Albanians were fired from their posts or lost their homes to Serbs (130,000 between 1990 and 1995).

== Eruption of war ==
=== The slide to war (1995–1998) ===
According to an Amnesty International report in 1998, due to dismissals from the Yugoslav government it was estimated that by 1998 the unemployment rate in the Kosovar Albanian population was higher than 70%. The economic apartheid imposed by Belgrade was aimed at impoverishing an already poor Kosovo Albanian population.

In 1996, 16,000 Serb refugees from Bosnia and Croatia were settled in Kosovo by the Milosevic government, sometimes against their will.

Ibrahim Rugova, later first President of the Republic of Kosovo, pursued a policy of passive resistance which succeeded in maintaining peace in Kosovo during the earlier wars in Slovenia, Croatia and Bosnia during the early 1990s. As evidenced by the emergence of the Kosovo Liberation Army (KLA), this came at the cost of increasing frustration among Kosovo's Albanian population. In the mid-1990s, Rugova pleaded for a United Nations peacekeeping force for Kosovo.

Continuing repression convinced many Albanians that only armed resistance would change the situation. On 22 April 1996, four attacks on Serbian security personnel were carried out almost simultaneously in different parts of Kosovo. The KLA, a hitherto-unknown organisation, subsequently claimed responsibility. The nature of the KLA was at first mysterious. It initially seemed that their only goal was to stop repression by Yugoslav authorities. The KLA also sought to establish Greater Albania, a state stretching into surrounding Macedonia, Montenegro and southern Serbia. In July 1998, in an interview for Der Spiegel, KLA spokesman Jakup Krasniqi publicly announced that the KLA's goal was the unification of all Albanian-inhabited lands. Sulejman Selimi, a General Commander of KLA in 1998–1999, said:

There is de facto Albanian nation. The tragedy is that European powers after World War I decided to divide that nation between several Balkan states. We are now fighting to unify the nation, to liberate all Albanians, including those in Macedonia, Montenegro, and other parts of Serbia. We are not just a liberation army for Kosovo.

While Rugova promised to uphold the minority rights of Serbs in Kosovo, the KLA was much less tolerant. Selimi stated that "Serbs who have blood on their hands would have to leave Kosovo".

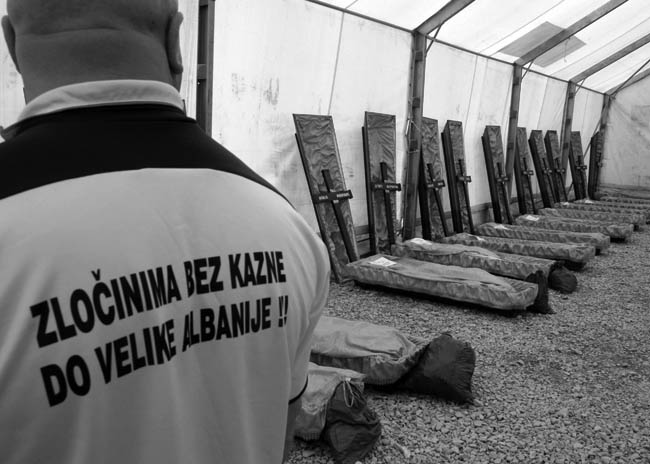
Serbian victims during insurgency

The crisis escalated in December 1997 at the Peace Implementation Council meeting in Bonn, where the international community (as defined in the Dayton Agreement) met. At the meeting, international delegates insisted that Kosovo be discussed and that Yugoslavia be responsive to Albanian demands there. Russia, the United States and Germany had all supported using the conference to issue this warning. The Bosnian Serb and Yugoslav delegations left the meeting in protest. This was followed by the return of the Contact Group that oversaw the last phases of the Bosnian conflict and declarations from European powers demanding that Yugoslavia solve the problem in Kosovo.

The KLA received financial and material support from the Kosovo Albanian diaspora. In early 1997, Albania collapsed into chaos following the fall of President Sali Berisha. Albanian Armed Forces stockpiles were looted with impunity by criminal gangs, with much of the hardware ending up in western Kosovo and boosting the growing KLA arsenal. Bujar Bukoshi, shadow prime minister in exile (in Zürich, Switzerland), created a group called FARK (Armed Forces of the Republic of Kosova). FARK and the KLA were initially rivals, but later FARK merged into the KLA. The Yugoslav government considered the KLA to be "terrorists" and "insurgents" who indiscriminately attacked police and civilians, while most Albanians saw the KLA as "freedom fighters".

On 23 February 1998, the United States Special Envoy to the Balkans, Robert Gelbard, stated in Pristina that "the KLA was without any question a terrorist group." He later told the House Committee on International Relations that "while the KLA had committed 'terrorist acts,' it had 'not been classified legally by the U.S. Government as a terrorist organization.'" However, his 23 February statements have been seen as unwittingly giving a "green light" to the Serbian crackdown that followed less than a week later.

=== War begins ===
KLA attacks intensified, centering on the Drenica valley area with the compound of Adem Jashari being a focal point during the first attack on Prekaz on 22 January 1998, where Yugoslav security forces were repelled in an attack on the compound, and were driven out of the village the next day by thousands of Jashari's supporters. Days after Robert Gelbard described the KLA as a terrorist group, Serbian police responded to the KLA attacks in the Likošane area, and pursued some of the KLA to Ćirez, resulting in the deaths of four Serbian policemen, 16 Albanian fighters and 26 civilians in the attacks on Likoshane and Çirez. The KLA's goal was to merge its Drenica stronghold with their stronghold in Albania proper, and this would shape the first few months of the fighting.

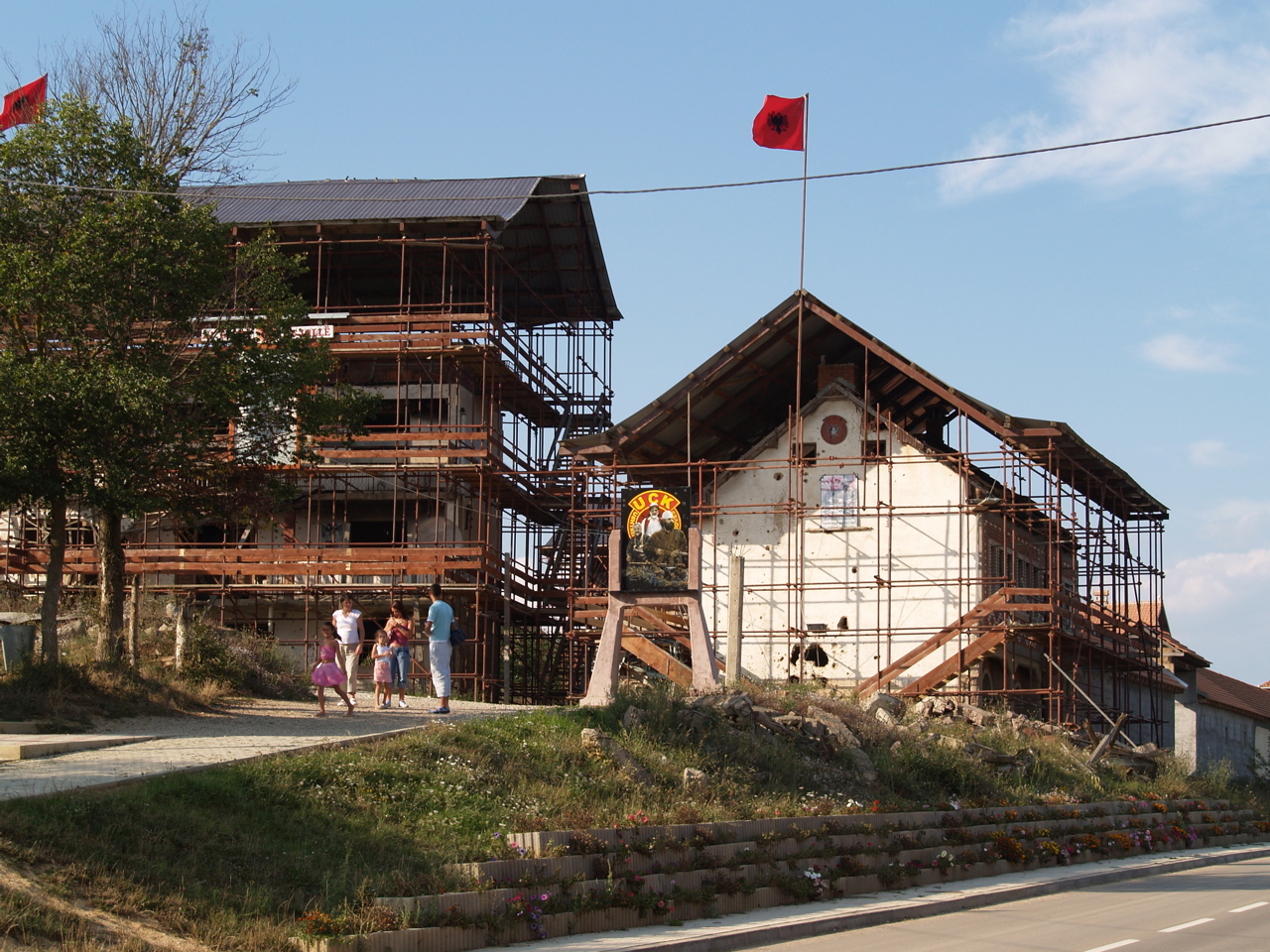
The Jashari family compound in Prekaz, where KLA leader Adem Jashari and 60 other people, mainly civilians, were murdered in the attack on Prekaz

Serb police then began to pursue Adem Jashari and his followers in the village of Donje Prekaze. After the failure of the first attempt on the Jashari compound in January, on 5 March 1998 a much larger attack on the Jashari compound in Prekaz led to the massacre of 60 Albanians, of which eighteen were women and ten were under the age of sixteen. The event provoked massive condemnation from western capitals. On 9 March 1998, Madeleine Albright said at a ministerial Contact Group meeting that "this crisis is not an internal affair of the FRY. The violence is an affront to universal standards of human rights we are pledged to uphold."

On 24 March, Yugoslav forces surrounded the village of Glodjane and attacked a rebel compound there. Despite superior firepower, the Yugoslav forces failed to destroy the KLA unit, which had been their objective. Although there were deaths and severe injuries on the Albanian side, the insurgency in Glodjane was far from stamped out. The village was in fact to become one of the strongest centres of resistance in the upcoming war.

A new Yugoslav government was formed at this time, led by the Socialist Party of Serbia and the Serbian Radical Party. Ultra-nationalist Radical Party chairman Vojislav Šešelj became a deputy prime minister. This increased the dissatisfaction with the country's position among Western diplomats and spokespersons.

In early April, Serbia arranged for a referendum on the issue of foreign interference in Kosovo. Serbian voters decisively rejected foreign interference in the crisis. Meanwhile, the KLA claimed much of the area in and around Deçan and ran a territory based in the village of Glodjane, encompassing its surroundings.

Throughout April, villages in the Dečani and Peć municipalities were the site of severe fighting. The town of Junik, just six kilometres from the border, was captured by the KLA. The villages of Dašinovac, Babaloć, and Glodjane were also captured.

In May, the security situation in Kosovo was rapidly deteriorating. KLA units attacked the police station in the village of Ponoševac near Ðakovica. Attacks were reported on border guards during the assault on Ponoševac. KLA unitscaptured Lapušnik, obstructing the Priština-Peć motorway. Another assault was mounted on the police station inRatkovac near the town of Orahovac, leading to the subsequent capture of the station and surrounding areas. In late-May, fighting between the KLA and the MUP broke out in western Kosovo, amid growing tensions between ethnic Albanians and ethnic Serbs in the town of Dečani.

On 1 June, the Yugoslav Army (VJ) and the MUP began an operation to unblock Dečani from the KLA. They succeeded in unblocking the town and the road, but the KLA still had a presence on both sides of the road. NATO's response to this offensive was mid-June's Operation Determined Falcon, a NATO show of force over the Yugoslav borders.

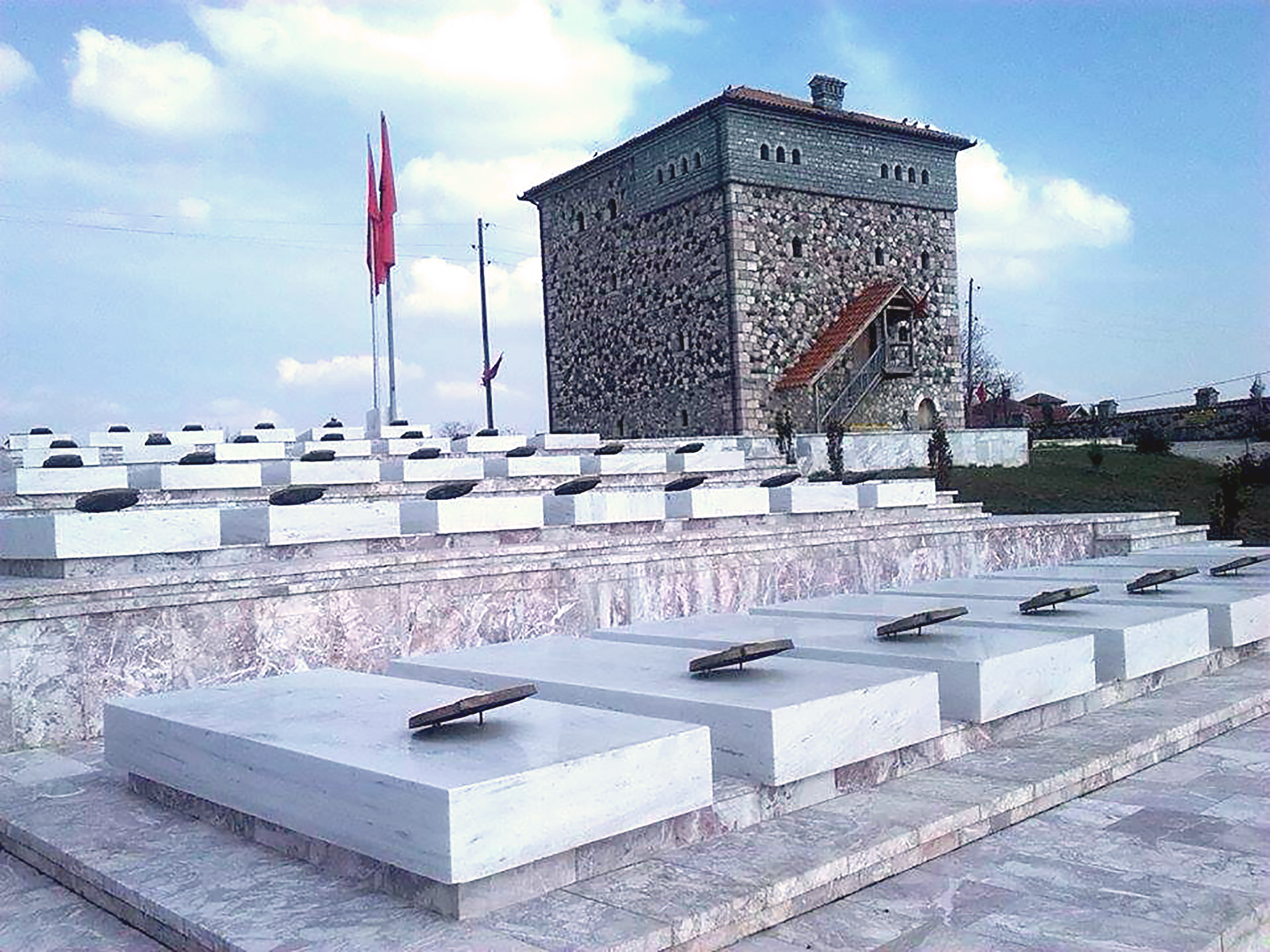
Memorial complex in Gllogjan, where the Battle of Glođane took place

During this time, Yugoslav President Milošević reached an arrangement with Boris Yeltsin of Russia to stop offensive operations and prepare for talks with the Albanians, who refused to talk to the Serbian side throughout the crisis, but would talk with the Yugoslav government. In fact, the only meeting between Milošević and Ibrahim Rugova happened on 15 May in Belgrade, two days after the special presidential envoy Richard Holbrooke announced that it would take place. According to Time Holbrooke threatened Milošević that if he did not obey, "what's left of your country will implode". A month later, Holbrooke visited the border areas affected by the fighting in early June, where he was photographed with the KLA. The publication of these images sent a signal to the KLA, its supporters and sympathisers, and to observers in general, that the US was decisively backing the KLA and the Albanian population in Kosovo.

The Yeltsin agreement required Milošević to allow international representatives to set up a mission in Kosovo to monitor the situation there. The Kosovo Diplomatic Observer Mission (KDOM) began operations in early July 1998.

All through June and into mid-July, the KLA were on the offensive. The KLA captured Mališevo and the surrounding area, establishing a capital in the town. They moved on to capture the Belaćevac coal pits in late June, threatening energy supplies in the region. In early July, the KLA captured multiple villages just south of Prizren. The KLA closed in on Peć, and were on the outskirts of the city. KLA units captured hilltop positions overlooking Ðakovica, further closing in. Their tactics focused mainly on guerrilla and mountain warfare, and harassing and ambushing Yugoslav forces and Serb police patrols.

The KLA launched their largest attack yet, an offensive on Orahovac and the surrounding area. On 17 July, the KLA stormed the town and subsequently captured it. KLA units captured villages on the road to Suva Reka, and towards Ratkovac. By then, the KLA held 40 to 50% of Kosovo. The Orthodox monastery of Zočište three miles (4.8 km) away was looted and torched. This led to a series of Yugoslav counter-offensives which would continue into the beginning of August.

A new set of KLA attacks in mid-August triggered Yugoslav operations in south-central Kosovo, south of the Pristina-Peja road. In early September, Yugoslav forces began an offensive near Prizren, and captured the KLA stronghold there. In western Kosovo, around Peja, another offensive caused condemnation as international officials expressed fear that a large column of displaced people would be attacked.

In early mid-September, for the first time, KLA activity was reported in northern Kosovo around Podujevo. Finally, in late September, a Yugoslav determined effort was made to clear the KLA out of the northern and central parts of Kosovo and out of the Drenica valley. During this time many threats were made from Western capitals but these were tempered somewhat by the elections in Bosnia, as they did not want Serbian Democrats and Radicals to win. Following the elections, the threats intensified once again. On 28 September, the mutilated corpses of a family were discovered by KDOM outside the village of Gornje Obrinje. The bloody image of a child's doll and streams of displaced persons rallied the international community to action.

==== Morale ====
Morale was a serious problem for Serb forces; intelligence surveys found that many soldiers disagreed with their comrades' actions. One tank commander reported, "for the entire time I was in Kosovo, I never saw an enemy soldier and my unit was never once involved in firing at enemy targets. The tanks which cost $2.5 million each were used to slaughter Albanian children... I am ashamed".

When retreating from Kosovo after NATO intervention, Yugoslav units appeared combat effective with high morale and displaying large holdings of undamaged equipment. Weeks before the end of hostilities, David Fromkin noted that "it seemed possible that NATO unity might crack before Yugoslav morale did." The announcement by President Clinton that the US would not deploy ground troops gave a tremendous boost to Serbian morale.

=== UN, NATO, and OSCE (1998–1999) ===
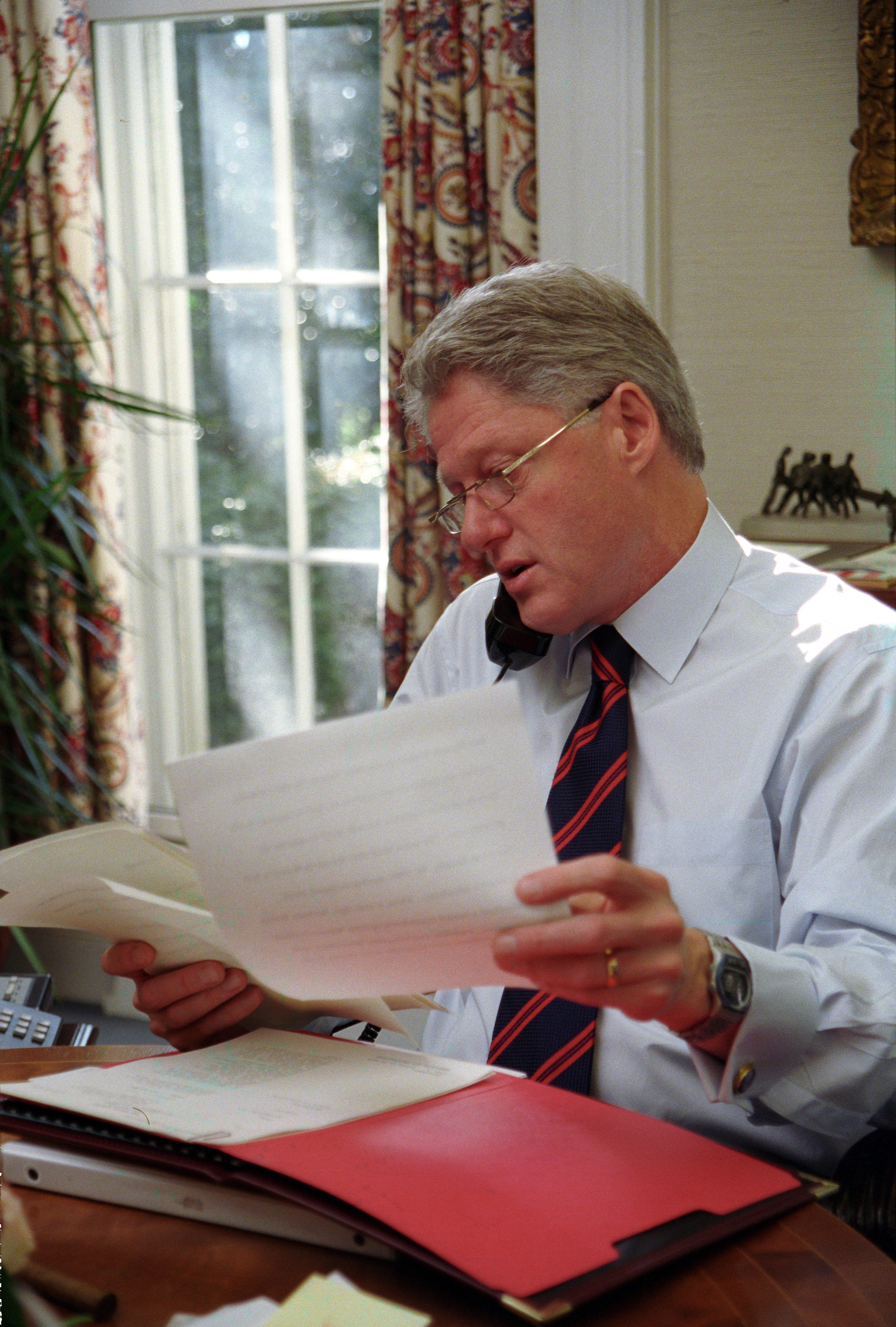
Clinton talks on the phone about the Kosovo War

On 9 June 1998, US President Bill Clinton declared a "national emergency" (state of emergency) due to the "unusual and extraordinary threat to the national security and foreign policy of the United States" imposed by Yugoslavia and Serbia over the Kosovo War.

On 23 September 1998, acting under Chapter VII of the United Nations Charter, the UN Security Council adopted Resolution 1199. This expressed 'grave concern' at reports reaching the Secretary General that over 230,000 people had been displaced from their homes by 'the excessive and indiscriminate use of force by Serbian security forces and the Yugoslav Army', demanding that all parties in Kosovo and the Federal Republic of Yugoslavia cease hostilities and maintain a ceasefire. On 24 September the North Atlantic Council (NAC) of NATO issued an "activation warning" taking NATO to an increased level of military preparedness for both a limited air option and a phased air campaign in Kosovo. The other major issue for those who saw no option but to resort to the use of force was the estimated 250,000 displaced Albanians, 30,000 of whom were out in the woods, without warm clothing or shelter, with winter fast approaching.

Meanwhile, the US Ambassador to the Republic of Macedonia, Christopher Hill, was leading shuttle diplomacy between an Albanian delegation, led by Rugova, and the Yugoslav and Serbian authorities. These meetings were shaping the peace plan to be discussed during a period of planned NATO occupation of Kosovo. During a period of two weeks, threats intensified, culminating in NATO's Activation Order being given. NATO was ready to begin airstrikes, and Richard Holbrooke went to Belgrade in the hope of reaching an agreement with Milošević. Officially, the international community demanded an end to fighting. It specifically demanded that Yugoslavia end its offensives against the KLA whilst attempting to convince the KLA to drop its bid for independence. Attempts were made to persuade Milošević to permit NATO peacekeeping troops to enter Kosovo. This, they argued, would allow for the Christopher Hill peace process to proceed and yield a peace agreement.

On 13 October 1998, the North Atlantic Council issued activation orders for the execution of both limited air strikes and a phased air campaign in Yugoslavia which would begin in approximately 96 hours. On 15 October the NATO Kosovo Verification Mission (KVM) Agreement for a ceasefire was signed, and the deadline for withdrawal was extended to 27 October. Difficulties implementing the agreement were reported, as clashes continued between government troops and the KLA separatists. The Serbian withdrawal commenced on or around 25 October 1998, and Operation Eagle Eye commenced on 30 October.

The KVM was a large contingent of unarmed Organization for Security and Co-operation in Europe (OSCE) peace monitors (termed verifiers) that moved into Kosovo in late 1998. Fighting resumed in December 1998 when both sides broke the ceasefire, and this surge in violence culminated in the killing of Zvonko Bojanić, the Serb mayor of the town of Kosovo Polje. Yugoslav authorities responded by launching a crackdown against KLA militants. Fighting also broke out in northern Kosovo, near Podujevo in late December.

The security situation in Kosovo in early 1999 brought increasing insecurity in urban areas, including bombings and murders. Such attacks took place during the Rambouillet talks in February and as the Kosovo Verification Agreement unraveled in March. Killings on the roads continued and increased. There were military confrontations in, among other places, the Vushtrri area in February and the heretofore unaffected Kaçanik area in early March.

On 15 January 1999 the Račak massacre occurred when 45 Kosovan Albanians were killed. The bodies had been discovered by OSCE monitors, including Head of Mission William G. Walker, and foreign news correspondents. Yugoslavia denied a massacre took place. The Račak massacre was the culmination of the conflict between the KLA and Yugoslav forces that had continued throughout the winter of 1998–1999. The incident was immediately condemned as a massacre by the Western countries and the United Nations Security Council, and later became the basis of one of the charges of war crimes leveled against Milošević and his top officials. This massacre was the turning point of the war. NATO decided that the conflict could only be settled by introducing a military peacekeeping force under the auspices of NATO, to forcibly restrain the two sides. Pristina, the capital of Kosovo, had been subjected to heavy firefights and segregation according to OSCE reports.

=== The Rambouillet Conference (January–March 1999) ===
On 30 January 1999, NATO issued a statement announcing that the North Atlantic Council had agreed that "the NATO Secretary General may authorise air strikes against targets on FRY territory" to "[compel] compliance with the demands of the international community and [to achieve] a political settlement". While this was mainly a threat to the Milošević government, it also included a coded threat to the Albanians: any decision would depend on the "position and actions of the Kosovo Albanian leadership and all Kosovo Albanian armed elements in and around Kosovo."

Also on 30 January 1999, the Contact Group issued a set of "non-negotiable principles" which made up a package known as "Status Quo Plus" – effectively the restoration of Kosovo's pre-1990 autonomy within Serbia, plus the introduction of democracy and supervision by international organisations. It also called for a peace conference to be held in February 1999 at the Château de Rambouillet, outside Paris.

The Rambouillet talks began on 6 February 1999, with NATO Secretary General Javier Solana negotiating with both sides. They were intended to conclude by 19 February. The FR Yugoslavian delegation was led by then president of Serbia Milan Milutinović, while Milošević himself remained in Belgrade. This was in contrast to the 1995 Dayton conference that ended the war in Bosnia, where Milošević negotiated in person. The absence of Milošević was interpreted as a sign that the real decisions were being made back in Belgrade, a move that aroused criticism in Yugoslavia as well as abroad; Kosovo's Serbian Orthodox bishop Artemije traveled to Rambouillet to protest that the delegation was unrepresentative. At this time, speculation about an indictment of Milošević for war crimes was rife, so his absence may have been motivated by fear of arrest.

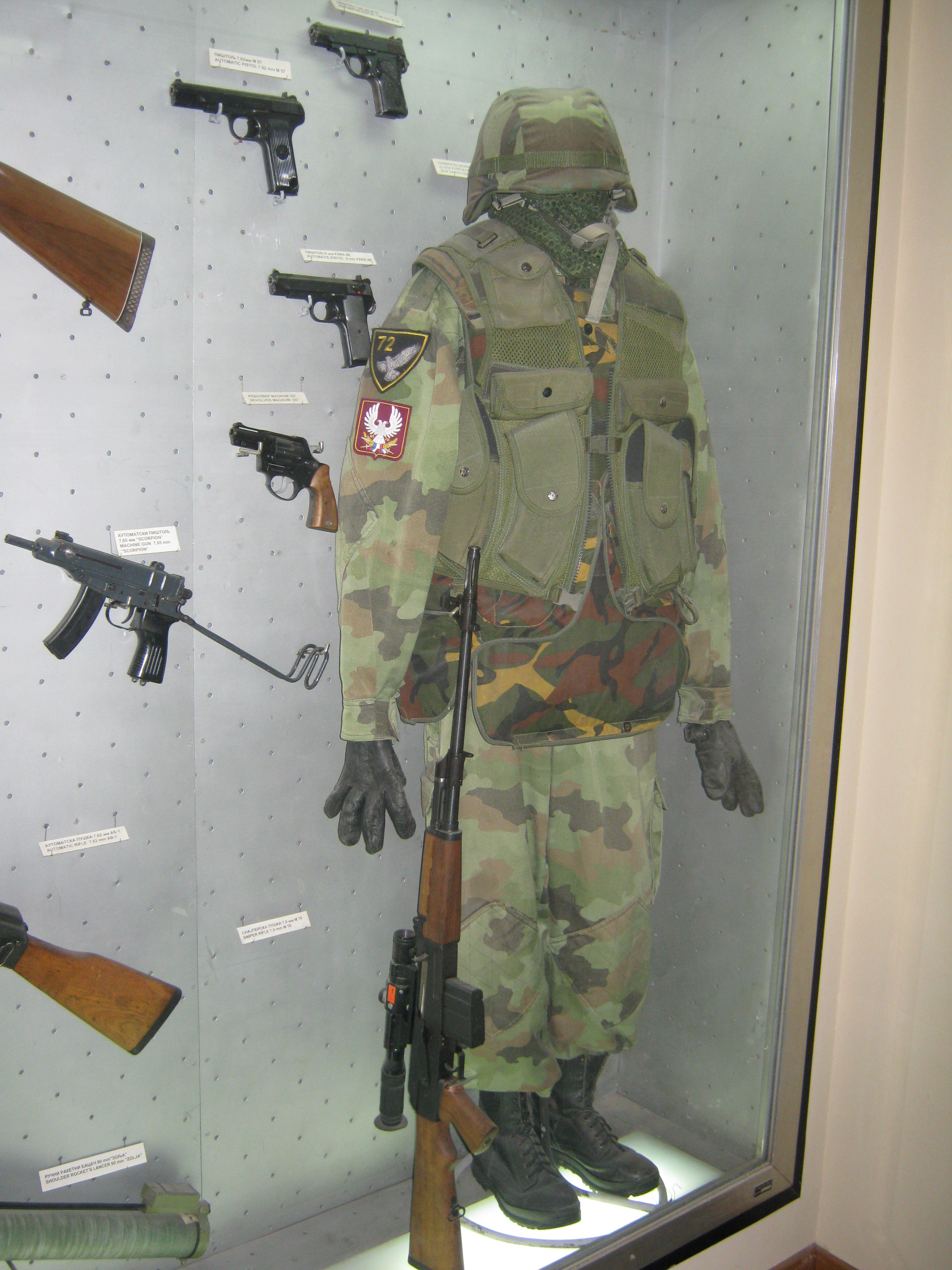
Equipment of 72nd Special Brigade Yugoslav Army in the 1999 Kosovo War

The first phase of negotiations was successful. The Contact Group co-chairmen issued a statement on 23 February 1999 that the negotiations "have led to a consensus on substantial autonomy for Kosovo, including on mechanisms for free and fair elections to democratic institutions, for the governance of Kosovo, for the protection of human rights and the rights of members of national communities; and for the establishment of a fair judicial system". They went on to say that "a political framework is now in place", leaving the further work of finalising "the implementation Chapters of the Agreement, including the modalities of the invited international civilian and military presence in Kosovo". While the Serbs agreed to an autonomous government, free elections, and the release of all political prisoners, the West also insisted on the presence of NATO troops.

While the accords did not fully satisfy the Albanians, they were much too radical for the Yugoslavs, who responded by substituting a drastically revised text that even Russia (an ally of FR Yugoslavia) found unacceptable. The revised text sought to reopen the issue of the political status of Kosovo and to delete the proposed implementation measures. It eliminated the chapter on humanitarian assistance and reconstruction, removed virtually all international oversight and dropped any mention of invoking "the will of the people [of Kosovo]" in determining the final status of the province. Amid accords, on 11 March 1999, Yugoslav forces began an operation near Prizren, which led to hundreds of villagers leaving the surrounding area. The VJ denied access to the OSCE at the VJ position near Dulje, showing rising concerns of NATO involvement in Kosovo.

On 18 March 1999, the Albanian, US, and British delegations signed what became known as the Rambouillet Accords, while the Yugoslav and Russian delegations refused. The accords called for NATO administration of Kosovo as an autonomous province within Yugoslavia, a force of 30,000 NATO troops to maintain order in Kosovo; an unhindered right of passage for NATO troops on Yugoslav territory, including Kosovo; and immunity for NATO and its agents to Yugoslav law. They would have also permitted a continuing Yugoslav army presence of 1,500 troops for border monitoring, backed by up to 1,000 troops to perform command and support functions, as well as a small number of border police, 2,500 ordinary MUP for public security purposes (although these were expected to draw down and to be transformed), and 3,000 local police.

The Yugoslav Government cited military provisions of Appendix B of the Rambouillet provisions as the reason for its objections, claiming that it was an unacceptable violation of Yugoslavia's sovereignty. The two sides did not discuss the issue in detail because of their disagreements on more fundamental problems. In particular, the Serb side rejected the idea of any NATO troop presence in Kosovo to replace their security forces, preferring unarmed UN observers. Milošević himself had refused to discuss the annex after informing NATO that it was unacceptable, even after he was asked to propose amendments to the provisions which would have made them acceptable.

After the failure at Rambouillet and the alternative Yugoslav proposal, international monitors from the OSCE withdrew on 22 March, to ensure their safety ahead of the anticipated NATO bombing campaign. On 23 March, the Serbian assembly accepted the principle of autonomy for Kosovo, as well as the non-military aspects of the agreement, but rejected a NATO troop presence.

In a 2009 judgement regarding six former Serb leaders charged with war crimes in Kosovo, the ICTY noted that the causes of the breakdown in the negotiations at Rambouillet were complex and stated that "international negotiators did not take an entirely even-handed approach to the respective positions of the parties and tended to favour the Kosovo Albanians." It further recorded that, according to a witness, on 14 April 1999, at a meeting initiated by the White House with representatives of the Serbian-American community, President Bill Clinton had stated that "the provision for allowing a referendum for the Albanians in Kosovo went too far and that, if he were in the shoes of Milošević, he probably would not have signed the draft [Rambouillet] agreement either."

== NATO bombing timeline ==
We are not going to war, but we are called upon to implement a peaceful solution in Kosovo, including by military means!

— German Chancellor Gerhard Schröder's announcement to the German people on 24 March 1999.

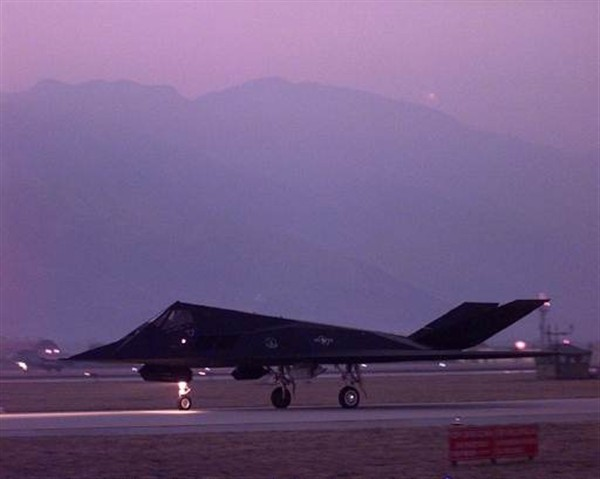
A US F-117 Nighthawk taxis to the runway before taking off from Aviano Air Base, Italy, on 24 March 1999

On 23 March 1999 at 21:30 UTC, Richard Holbrooke returned to Brussels and announced that peace talks had failed and formally handed the matter to NATO for military action. Hours before the announcement, Yugoslavia announced on national television it had declared a state of emergency, citing an imminent threat of war and began a huge mobilisation of troops and resources.

On 23 March 1999 at 22:17 UTC, the Secretary General of NATO, Javier Solana, announced he had directed the Supreme Allied Commander Europe (SACEUR), US Army General Wesley Clark, to "initiate air operations in the Federal Republic of Yugoslavia." On 24 March at 19:00 UTC, NATO started its bombing campaign against Yugoslavia.

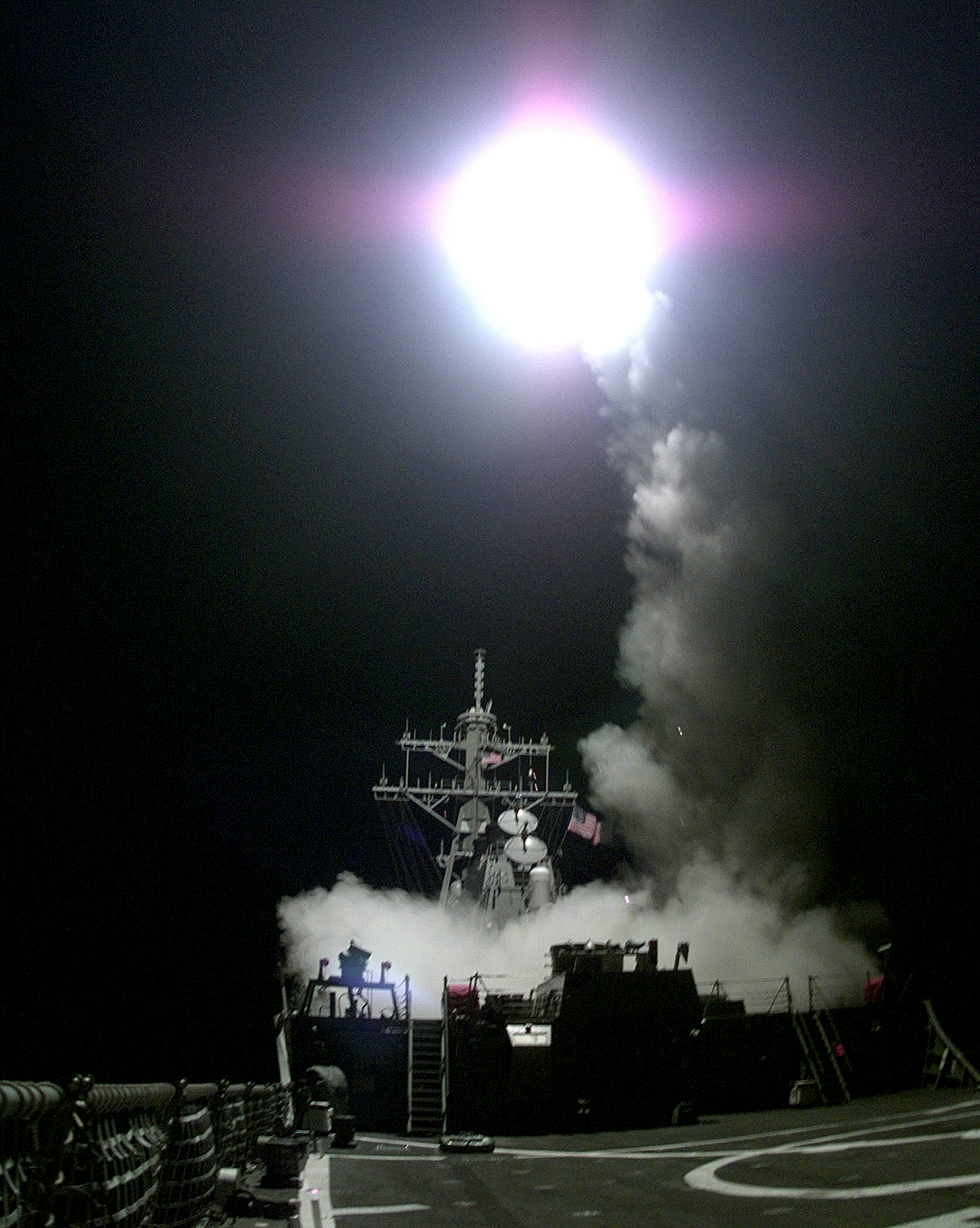
A Tomahawk cruise missile launches from the aft missile deck of USS Gonzalez on 31 March 1999

The NATO bombing campaign lasted from 24 March to 11 June 1999, involving up to 1,000 aircraft operating mainly from bases in Italy and aircraft carriers stationed in the Adriatic. Tomahawk cruise missiles were also extensively used, fired from aircraft, ships, and submarines. With the exception of Greece, all NATO members were involved to some degree. Over the ten weeks of the conflict, NATO aircraft flew over 38,000 combat missions. For the German Air Force (Luftwaffe), it was the second time it had participated in a conflict since World War II, after the Bosnian War.

The proclaimed goal of the NATO operation was summed up by its spokesman as "Serbs out, peacekeepers in, refugees back". That is, Yugoslav troops would have to leave Kosovo and be replaced by international peacekeepers to ensure that the Albanian refugees could return to their homes. The campaign was initially designed to destroy Yugoslav air defences and high-value military targets. It did not go very well at first, with bad weather hindering many sorties early on. NATO had seriously underestimated Milošević's will to resist: few in Brussels thought that the campaign would last more than a few days, and although the initial bombardment was not insignificant, it did not match the intensity of the bombing of Baghdad in 1991.

NATO military operations switched increasingly to attacking Yugoslav units on the ground, hitting targets as small as individual tanks and artillery pieces, as well as continuing with the strategic bombardment. This activity was heavily constrained by politics, as each target needed to be approved by all nineteen member states. Montenegro was bombed on several occasions, but NATO eventually desisted to prop up the precarious position of its anti-Milošević leader, Milo Đukanović.

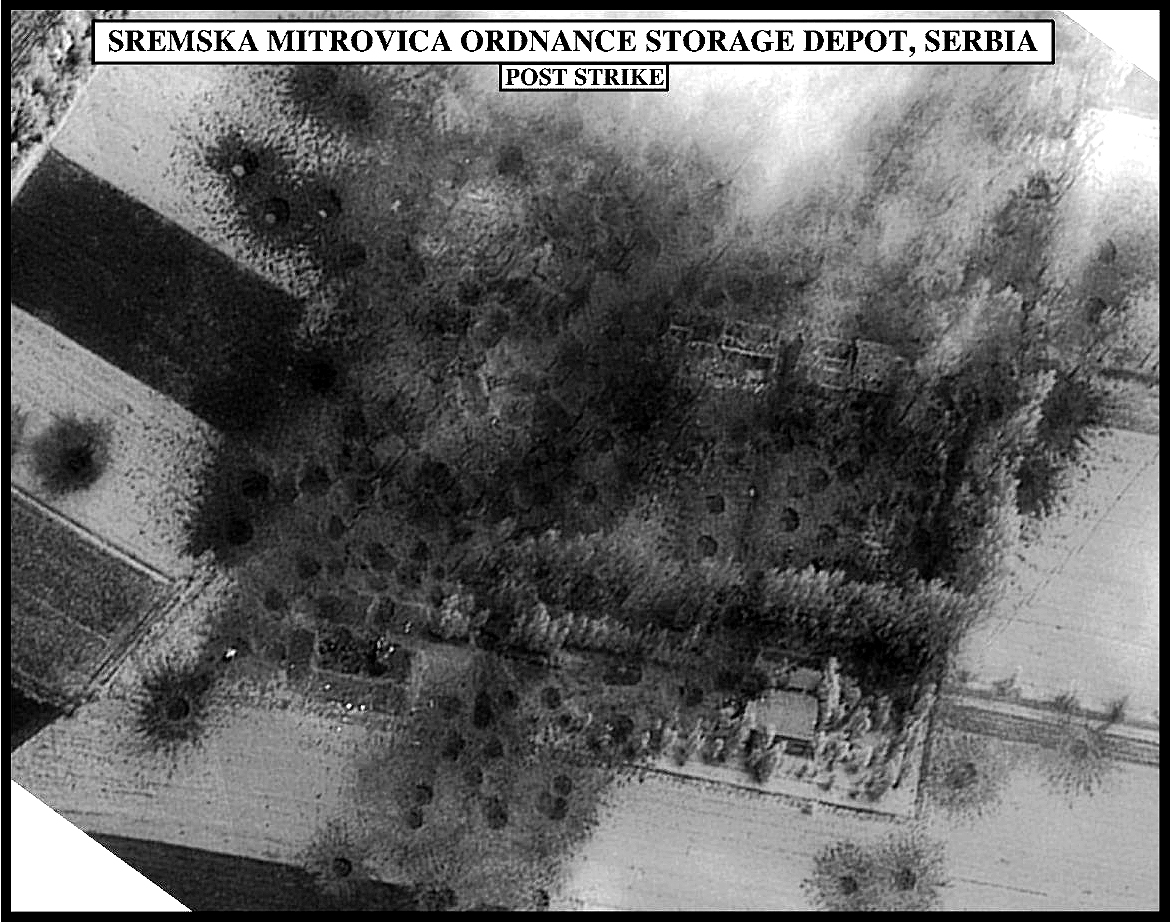
Post-strike damage assessment of the Sremska Mitrovica ordnance storage depot, Serbia

At the start of May, a NATO aircraft attacked an Albanian refugee convoy, believing it was a Yugoslav military convoy, killing around fifty people. NATO admitted its mistake five days later, and the Yugoslavs accused NATO of deliberately attacking the refugees. A later report conducted by the ICTY opined that "civilians were not deliberately attacked in this incident", and that "neither the aircrew nor their commanders displayed the degree of recklessness in failing to take precautionary measures which would sustain criminal charges." On 7 May, NATO bombs hit the Chinese Embassy in Belgrade, killing three Chinese journalists and outraging Chinese public opinion. The United States and NATO later apologised for the bombing, saying that it occurred because of an outdated map provided by the CIA, although this was challenged by a joint report from The Observer (UK) and Politiken (Denmark) newspapers, which claimed that NATO intentionally bombed the embassy because it was being used as a relay station for Yugoslav army radio signals. The report by the newspaper contradicts findings in the same report by the ICTY which stated that the root of the failures in target location "appears to stem from the land navigation techniques employed by an intelligence officer." In another incident at the Dubrava prison in Kosovo in May 1999, the Yugoslav government attributed as many as 95 civilian deaths to NATO bombing of the facility after NATO cited Serbian and Yugoslav military activity in the area; a Human Rights Watch report later concluded that at least nineteen ethnic Albanian prisoners had been killed by the bombing, but that an uncertain number – probably more than 70 – were killed by Serbian Government forces in the days immediately following the bombing.

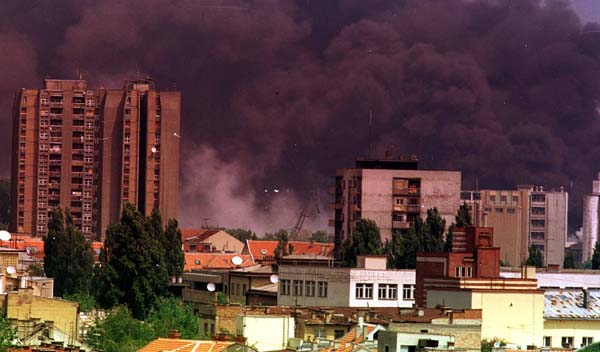
Smoke in Novi Sad after NATO bombardment

By the start of April, the conflict appeared little closer to a resolution, and NATO countries began to seriously consider conducting ground operations in Kosovo. British prime minister Tony Blair was a strong advocate of ground forces and pressured the United States to agree; his strong stance caused some alarm in Washington as US forces would be making the largest contribution to any offensive. US President Bill Clinton was extremely reluctant to commit US forces for a ground offensive. Instead, Clinton authorised a CIA operation to look into methods to destabilise the Yugoslav government without training KLA troops. At the same time, Finnish and Russian diplomatic negotiators continued to try to persuade Milošević to back down. Tony Blair would order 50,000 British soldiers to be made ready for a ground offensive: most of the available British Army.

Milošević finally recognised that Russia would not intervene to defend Yugoslavia despite Moscow's strong anti-NATO rhetoric. He thus accepted the conditions offered by a Finnish–Russian mediation team and agreed to a military presence within Kosovo headed by the UN, but incorporating NATO troops.

== Yugoslav army withdrawal and the entry of KFOR ==
On 3 June 1999, Milošević accepted the terms of an international peace plan to end the fighting, with the national parliament adopting the proposal amid contentious debate with delegates coming close to fistfights at some points. On 9 June 1999, NATO and FRY authorities signed the Kumanovo Agreement, paving the way for an interntional securitiy force in Kosovo, contingent on the UN passing a resolution affirming it. On 10 June, the North Atlantic Council ratified the agreement and suspended air operations. That same day, the United Nations Security Council passed Resolution 1244.

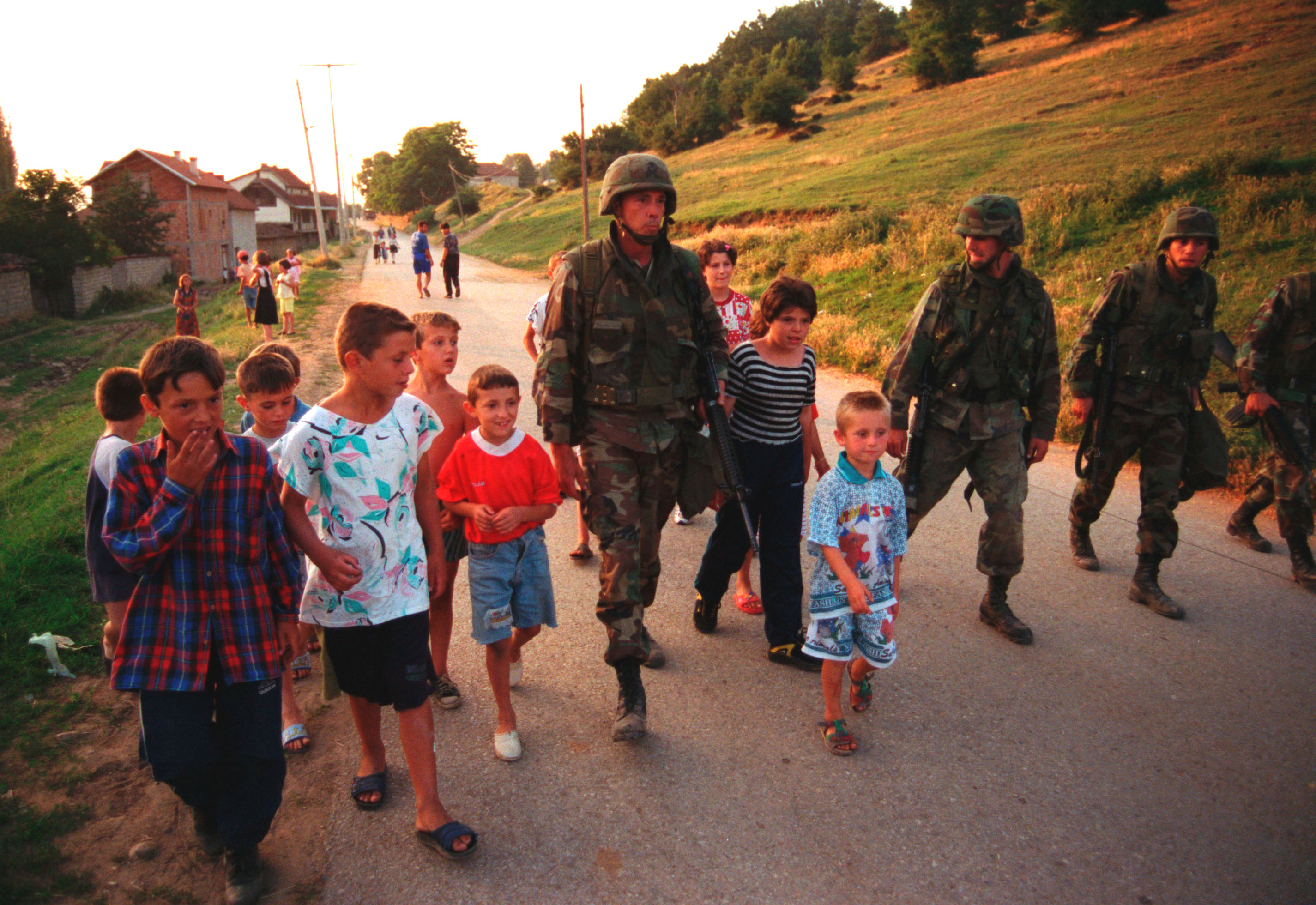
US Marines walk with local Albanian children down the main street of Zegra on 28 June 1999

On 12 June, the NATO-led peacekeeping Kosovo Force (KFOR) of 30,000 soldiers began entering Kosovo. KFOR had been preparing to conduct combat operations, but in the end, its mission was only peacekeeping. The force was based upon the Allied Rapid Reaction Corps headquarters commanded by then Lieutenant General Mike Jackson of the British Army. It consisted of British forces (a brigade built from 4th Armoured Brigade and 5th Airborne Brigade), a French Army Brigade, a German Army brigade, which entered from the west, while other forces advanced from the south, and Italian Army and United States Army brigades.

The first NATO troops to enter Pristina on the 12th of June 1999 were Norwegian special forces from Forsvarets Spesialkommando (FSK) and soldiers from the British Special Air Service 22 Regiment, although to NATO's diplomatic embarrassment Russian troops arrived at the airport first. Norwegian soldiers were the first to come into contact with Russian troops at the airport. FSK's mission was to level the negotiating field between the belligerent parties, and to fine-tune the detailed, local deals needed to implement the peace deal between the Serbians and the Kosovo Albanians.

The US contribution, known as the Initial Entry Force, was led by the 1st Armored Division, commanded by Brigadier General Peterson, and was spearheaded by a platoon from the 2nd Battalion, 505th Parachute Infantry Regiment attached to the British Forces. Other units included 1st and 2nd Battalions of the 10th Special Forces Group (Airborne) from Stuttgart, Germany and Fort Carson, Colorado, TF 1–6 Infantry (1-6 infantry with C Co 1-35AR) from Baumholder, Germany, the 2nd Battalion, 505th Parachute Infantry Regiment from Fort Bragg, North Carolina, the 26th Marine Expeditionary Unit from Camp Lejeune, North Carolina, the 1st Battalion, 26th Infantry Regiment from Schweinfurt, Germany, and Echo Troop, 4th Cavalry Regiment, also from Schweinfurt, Germany. Also attached to the US force was the Greek Army's 501st Mechanised Infantry Battalion. The initial US forces established their area of operation around the towns of Uroševac, the future Camp Bondsteel, and Gnjilane, at Camp Monteith, and spent four months – the start of a stay which continues to date – establishing order in the southeast sector of Kosovo.

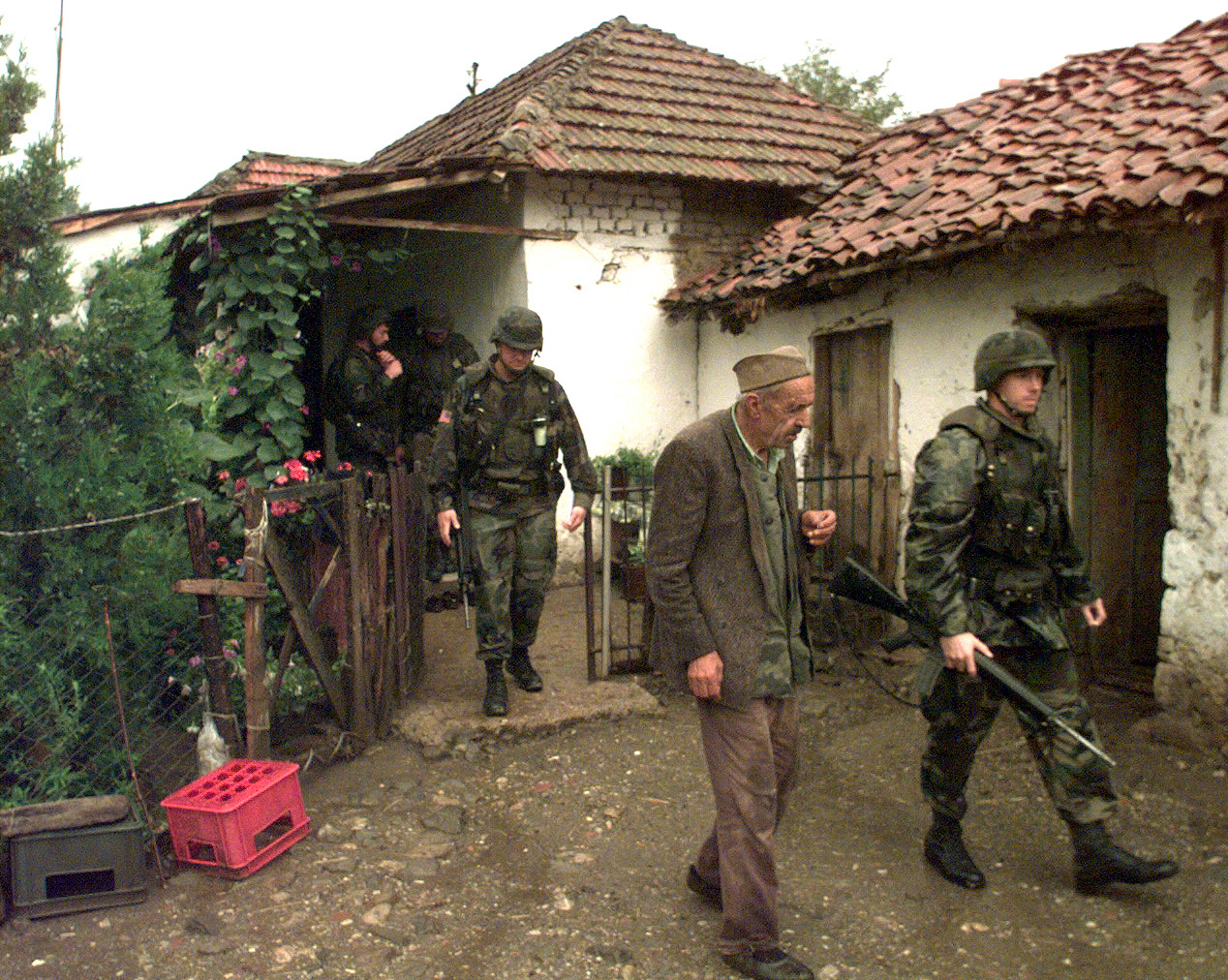
US soldiers escort a Serbian civilian from his home in Zitinje after finding an automatic weapon, 26 July 1999

During the initial incursion, the US soldiers were greeted by Albanians cheering and throwing flowers as US soldiers and KFOR rolled through their villages. Although no armed resistance by Serbs was met, (aside from a firefight in a village two weeks later), three US soldiers from the Initial Entry Force were killed in accidents.

On 1 October 1999, approximately 150 paratroopers from Alpha Company, 1/508th Airborne Battalion Combat Team from Vicenza, Italy parachuted into Uroševac as part of Operation Rapid Guardian. The purpose of the mission was primarily to warn Yugoslav President Slobodan Milošević of NATO resolve and of its rapid military capability. One US soldier, Army Ranger Sgt. Jason Neil Pringle, was killed during operations after his parachute failed to deploy. The paratroopers of the 1/508th then joined paratroopers of the 82nd Airborne and KFOR in patrolling various areas of Kosovo, without incident, through 3 October 1999.

On 15 December 1999, Staff Sergeant Joseph Suponcic of 3rd Battalion/10th Special Forces Group (Airborne) was killed, when the HMMWV in which he was a passenger struck an anti-tank mine planted by Albanians and meant for the Russian contingent with which SSG Suponcic's team was patrolling in Kosovska Kamenica.

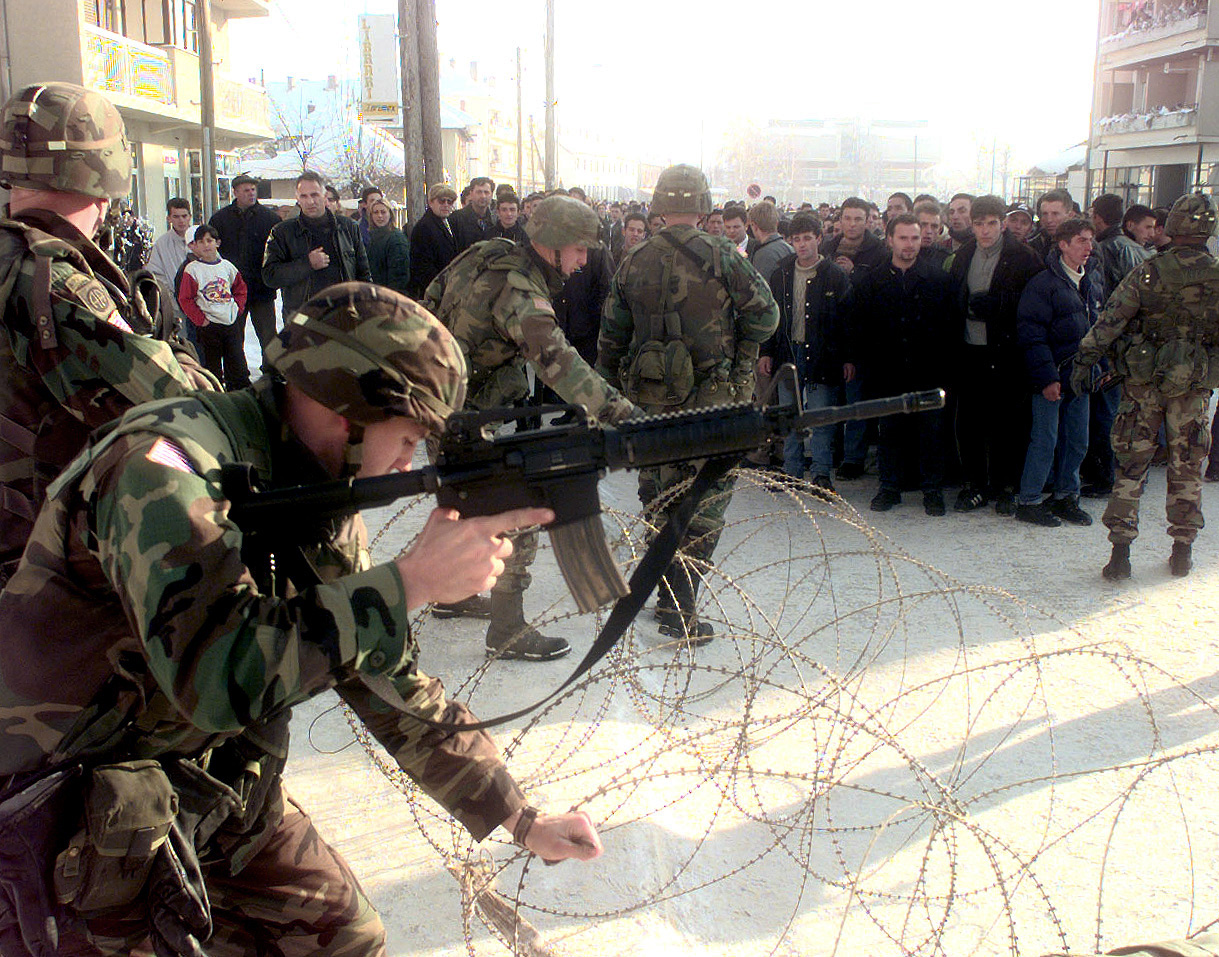
US soldiers maintain crowd control as Albanian residents of Vitina protest in the streets on 9 January 2000

Following the military campaign, the involvement of Russian peacekeepers proved to be tense and challenging to the NATO Kosovo force. The Russians expected to have an independent sector of Kosovo, only to be unhappily surprised with the prospect of operating under NATO command. Without prior communication or coordination with NATO, Russian peacekeeping forces entered Kosovo from Bosnia and Herzegovina and occupied Pristina International Airport ahead of the arrival of NATO forces. This resulted in an incident during which NATO Supreme Commander Wesley Clark's wish to forcibly block the runways with NATO vehicles, to prevent any Russian reinforcement, was refused by KFOR commander General Mike Jackson.

In 2010, James Blunt described in an interview how his unit was given the assignment of securing Pristina during the advance of the 30,000-strong peacekeeping force and how the Russian Army had moved in and taken control of the city's airport before his unit's arrival. Blunt shared a part in the difficult task of addressing the potentially violent international incident. According to Blunt's account there was a stand-off with the Russians, and NATO Supreme Commander Clark gave provisional orders to over-power them. Whilst these were questioned by Blunt, they were rejected by General Jackson, with the now famous line, "I'm not having my soldiers responsible for starting World War III."

In June 2000, arms trading relations between Russia and Yugoslavia were exposed, which led to retaliation and bombings of Russian checkpoints and area police stations. Outpost Gunner was established on a high point in the Preševo Valley by Echo Battery 1/161 Field Artillery in an attempt to monitor and assist with peacekeeping efforts in the Russian Sector. Operating under the support of 2/3 Field Artillery, 1st Armored Division, the Battery was able to successfully deploy and continuously operate a Firefinder Radar system, which allowed the NATO forces to keep a closer watch on activities in the Sector and the Preševo Valley. Eventually a deal was struck whereby Russian forces operated as a unit of KFOR but not under the NATO command structure.

== Reactions ==
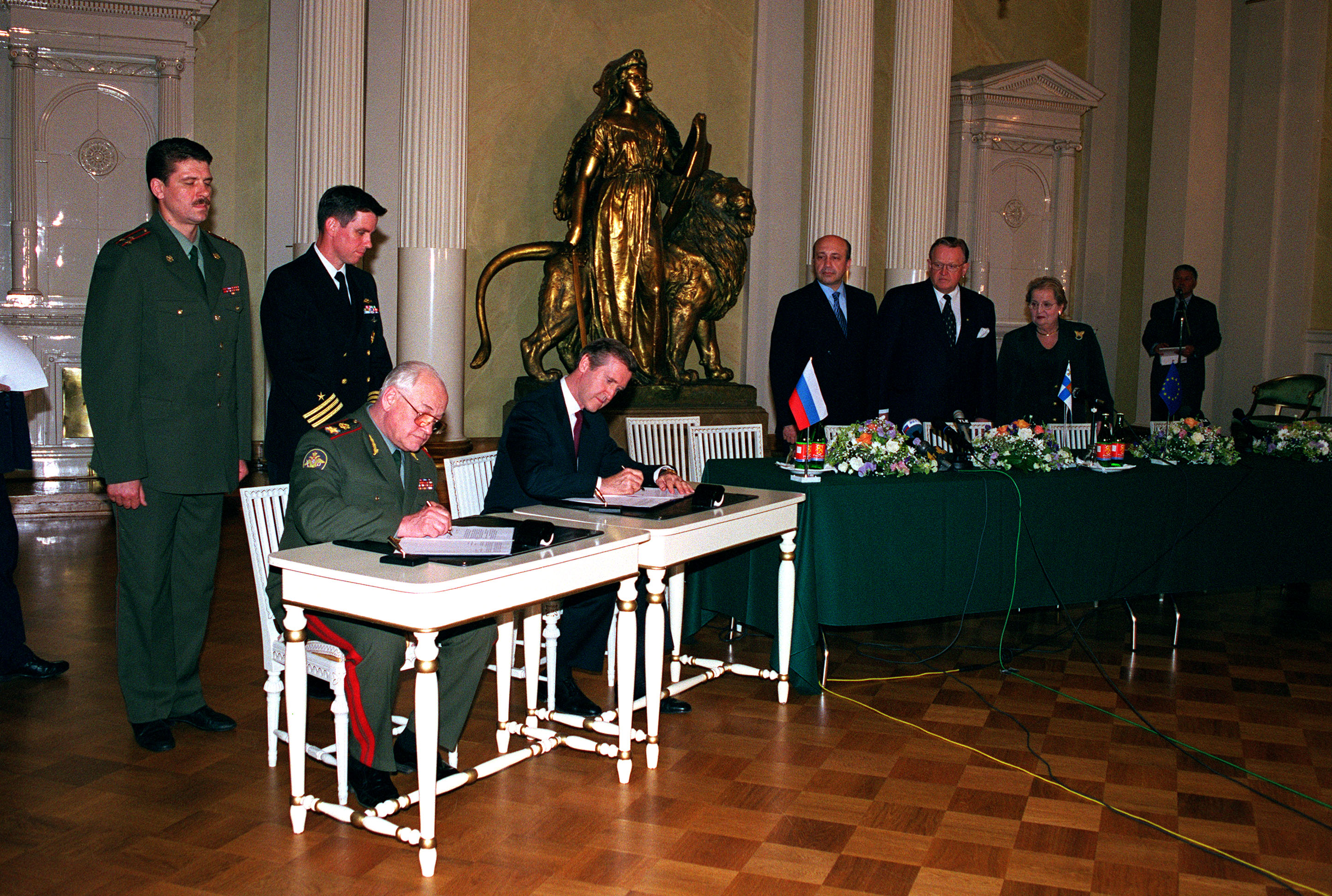
Russian Minister of Defense Marshal Igor Sergeyev (seated left) and U.S. Secretary of Defense William S. Cohen (seated center) sign the agreed principles which are the basis for Russian participation in the international peacekeeping force (KFOR) in Kosovo at the Presidential Place in Helsinki, Finland, on June 18, 1999. Observing the signing are Russian Minister of Foreign Affairs Igor Ivanov (3rd from right), Finnish President Martti Ahtisaari (2nd from right) and U.S. Secretary of State Madeleine Albright (right).

Because of the country's restrictive media laws, the Yugoslav media carried little coverage of events in Kosovo, and the attitude of other countries to the humanitarian disaster that was occurring there. Thus, few members of the Yugoslav public expected NATO intervention, instead thinking that a diplomatic agreement would be reached.

=== Support ===
Support for the Kosovan War and, in particular, the legitimacy of NATO's bombing campaign came from a variety of sources. In a 2009 article, David Clark claimed "Every member of NATO, every EU country, and most of Yugoslavia's neighbours, supported military action." Statements from the leaders of United States, Czech Republic and United Kingdom, respectively, described the war as one "upholding our values, protecting our interests, and advancing the cause of peace", "the first war for values" and one "to avert what would otherwise be a humanitarian disaster in Kosovo." Others included the then UN Secretary General Kofi Annan who was reported by some sources as acknowledging that the NATO action was legitimate who emphasised that there were times when the use of force was legitimate in the pursuit of peace though Annan stressed that the "[UN Security] Council should have been involved in any decision to use force." The distinction between the legality and legitimacy of the intervention was further highlighted in two separate reports. One was conducted by the Independent International Commission on Kosovo, entitled The Kosovo Report, which found that:

[Yugoslav] forces were engaged in a well-planned campaign of terror and expulsion of the Kosovar Albanians. This campaign is most frequently described as one of "ethnic cleansing," intended to drive many, if not all, Kosovar Albanians from Kosovo, destroy the foundations of their society, and prevent them from returning.

It concluded that "the NATO military intervention was illegal but legitimate", The second report was published by the NATO Office of Information and Press which reported that, "the human rights violations committed on a large scale in Kosovo provide an incontestable ground with reference to the humanitarian aspect of NATO's intervention." Some critics note that NATO did not have the backing of the United Nations Security Council meant that its intervention had no legal basis, but according to some legal scholars, "there are nonetheless certain bases for that action that are not legal, but justified."

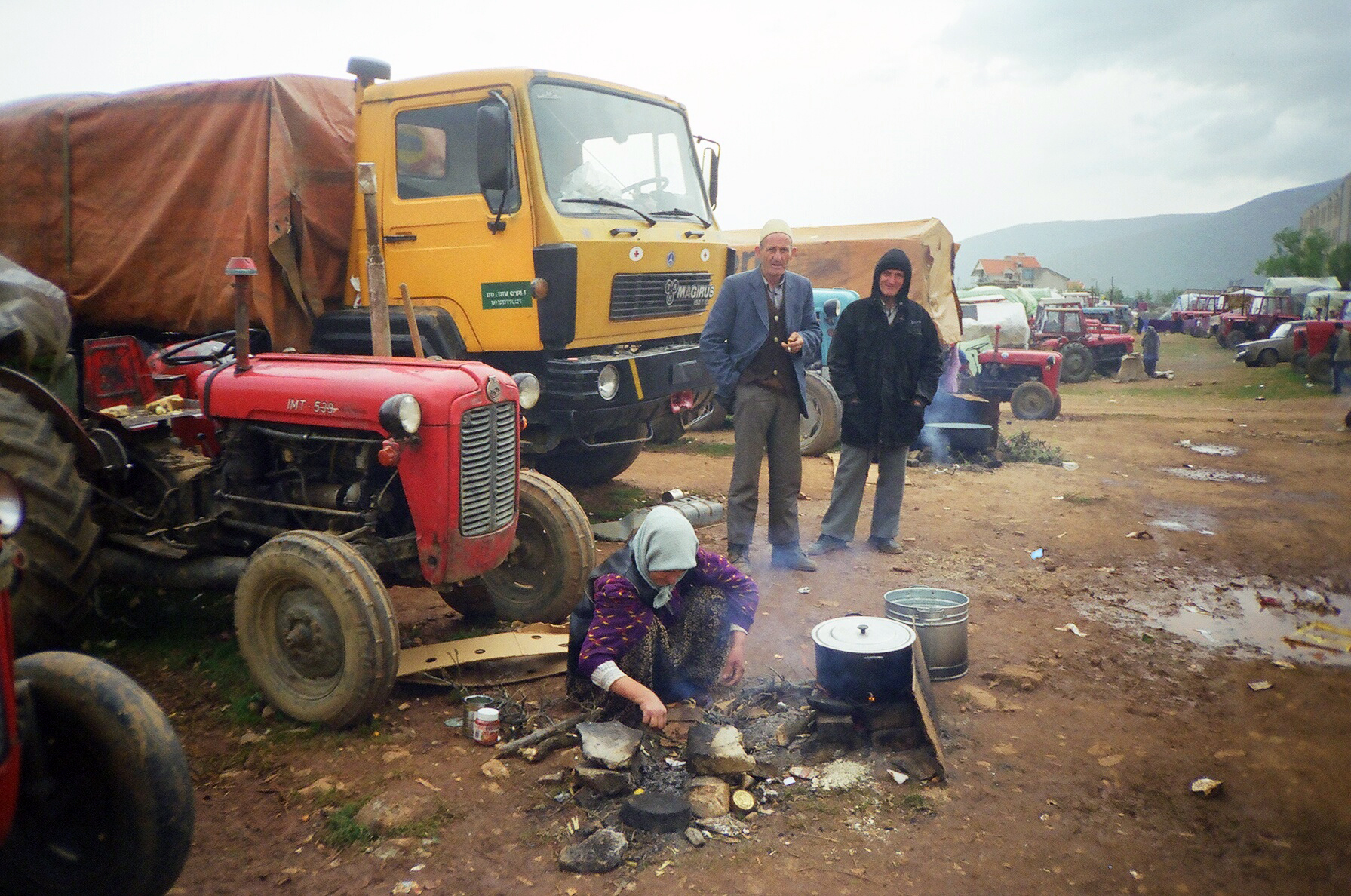
Kosovo Albanian refugees in 1999

Aside from politicians and diplomats, commentators and intellectuals also supported the war. Michael Ignatieff called NATOs intervention a "morally justifiable response to ethnic cleansing and the resulting flood of refugees, and not the cause of the flood of refugees" while Christopher Hitchens said NATO intervened only, "when Serbian forces had resorted to mass deportation and full-dress ethnic 'cleansing.'" Writing in The Nation, Richard A. Falk wrote that, "the NATO campaign achieved the removal of Yugoslav military forces from Kosovo and, even more significant, the departure of the dreaded Serbian paramilitary units and police" while an article in The Guardian wrote that for Mary Kaldor, Kosovo represented a laboratory on her thinking for human security, humanitarian intervention and international peacekeeping, the latter two which she defined as, "a genuine belief in the equality of all human beings; and this entails a readiness to risk lives of peacekeeping troops to save the lives of others where this is necessary." Reports stated there had been no peace between Albanians and Serbs, citing the deaths of 1,500 Albanians and displacement of 270,000 prior to NATO intervention.

=== Criticism ===
The NATO intervention has been seen as a political diversionary tactic, coming as it did on the heels of the Monica Lewinsky scandal, pointing to the fact that coverage of the bombing directly replaced coverage of the scandal in US news cycles. Herbert Foerstel points out that before the bombing, rather than there being an unusually bloody conflict, the KLA was not engaged in a widespread war against Yugoslav forces and the death toll among all concerned (including ethnic Albanians) skyrocketed following NATO intervention. In a post-war report released by the Organization for Security and Co-operation in Europe, the organization also noted "the pattern of the expulsions and the vast increase in lootings, killings, rape, kidnappings and pillage once the NATO air war began on March 24".

Noam Chomsky argues that the bombing was "not undertaken in “response” to ethnic cleansing and to “reverse” it, as leaders alleged", but rather that "with full awareness of the likely consequences, Clinton and Blair decided in favor of a war that led to a radical escalation of ethnic cleansing along with other deleterious effects." Chomsky also notes, similarly to Foerstel, that the number of casualties in the war before the bombing constituted a small number. He concludes that it is impossible to justify the bombing, as there "could be no reasonable expectation of massive ethnic cleansing and violence". According to Chomsky, the Račak massacre that was considered a turning point for NATO amounted to 45 deaths, a very low number compared to the atrocities committed from both sides after the bombing. According to the International Herald Tribune, "U.S. intelligence reported ... that the Kosovo rebels intended to draw NATO into its fight for independence by provoking Serbian forces into further atrocities."

U.S. President Clinton, his administration and NATO governments were accused of inflating the number of Kosovo Albanians killed by state forces. During the NATO bombing campaign, the then Secretary of Defense, William Cohen claimed that 100,000 Kosovo Albanian men of military age were missing, possibly murdered. The conservative media watchdog group Accuracy in Media charged the alliance with distorting the situation in Kosovo and lying about the number of civilian deaths in order to justify U.S. involvement in the conflict.

After the bombing of the Chinese embassy in Belgrade, Chinese President Jiang Zemin said that the US was using its economic and military superiority to aggressively expand its influence and interfere in the internal affairs of other countries. Chinese leaders called the NATO campaign a dangerous precedent of naked aggression, a new form of colonialism, and an aggressive war groundless in morality or law. It was seen as part of a plot by the US to destroy Yugoslavia, expand eastward and control all of Europe.

The United Nations Charter does not allow military interventions in other sovereign countries with few exceptions which, in general, need to be decided upon by the United Nations Security Council; this legal enjoinment has proved controversial with many legal scholars who argue that though the Kosovo War was illegal, it was still legitimate. The issue was brought before the UN Security Council by Russia, in a draft resolution which, inter alia, would affirm "that such unilateral use of force constitutes a flagrant violation of the United Nations Charter". China, Namibia, and Russia voted for the resolution, the other members against, thus it failed to pass.

The war inflicted many casualties. Already by March 1999, an estimated 1,500–2,000 civilians and combatants were dead. However, estimates showed that prior to the bombing campaign on 24 March 1999, approximately 1,800 civilians had been killed in the Kosovo war, mostly Albanians but also Serbs and that there had been no evidence of genocide or ethnic cleansing. By November 1999, 2,108 victims had been exhumed from the province with a total approaching 3,000 expected, but it was unclear how many were civilians and combatants, while the number was also far from the 10,000 minimum civilian death figure cited by Western officials. Final estimates of the casualties are still unavailable for either side.

Perhaps the most controversial deliberate attack of the war was that made against the headquarters of RTS, Serbian public radio and television, on 23 April 1999, which killed at least fourteen people.

Privately, NATO European members were divided about the aims and necessity of the war. Most European allies did not trust the motives of Kosovan Albanians and according to NATO General Wesley Clark, "There was a sense among some that NATO was fighting on the wrong side" in a war between Christians and Muslims.

== Democratic League of Kosovo and FARK ==
The Democratic League of Kosovo (DLK) led by Ibrahim Rugova had been the leading political entity in Kosovo since its creation in 1989. Its parallel government in exile was led by Bujar Bukoshi, and its Minister of Defence until 1998 was the former Yugoslav colonel Ahmet Krasniqi. DLK politicians opposed the armed conflict and were not ready to accept KLA as a political factor in the region and tried to persuade the population not to support it. At one point Rugova even claimed that it was set up by Serbian intelligence as an excuse to invade, or to discredit DLK itself. Nevertheless, the support for KLA even within DLK membership and specifically in the diaspora grew, together with the dissatisfaction with and antagonism toward DLK. KLA initial personnel were members or former members of the DLK. With the changes of the international stance towards KLA and its recognition as a factor in the conflict, DLK's position also shifted. The Armed Forces of the Republic of Kosovo, known as FARK, were established in order to place DLK as a military factor in addition to a political one. A parallel paramilitary structure such as FARK was not received well by the KLA.

On 21 September 1998 Ahmet Krasniqi was shot in Tirana. Those responsible were not found, although several theories emerged. The Democratic Party of Albania and its leader Sali Berisha, strong supporters of DLK and FARK, accused SHIK and the Albanian government, which was supporting the KLA, of being responsible. FARK was never a determining factor in the war and was not involved in any battles. It did not number more than few hundred men, and it did not show any commitment to fighting the Serbs, accepting a broader autonomy as a solution rather than independence. Some of the FARK officers were incorporated later under the KLA umbrella. Besides FARK, DLK would also politically and diplomatically oppose KLA and their methods. In a meeting with US President Clinton on 29 May 1999, Rugova, accompanied by Fehmi Agani, Bukoshi, and Veton Surroi, accused KLA of being a left-wing ideology bearer, and some of its leaders as being "nostalgic to known communist figures, such as Enver Hoxha", referring to the People's Movement of Kosovo (LPK) nucleus of KLA, an old underground rival with strong left-wing orientation.

Rugova was present at the negotiations held in Rambouillet and supported the Rambouillet Agreement since the first round, but without any influence. Following the ethnic cleansing of the Albanian population, there was close to a total Albanian support for the NATO campaign, including the DLK side. Surprisingly, Ibrahim Rugova showed up in Belgrade as a guest of Milosevic. At a joint TV appearance on 1 April, ending in a Rugova-Milosevic handshake, Rugova asked for a peaceful solution and the bombings to stop. In the same conference, Millosevic presented his proposal for Kosovo as part of a three-unit federal Yugoslavian state. Rugova's presence in Belgrade scattered another set of accusations from KLA and its supporters. Besides being 'passive' and 'too peaceful', Rugova and DLK were accused as 'traitors'. Following Rugova's passage to Italy on 5 May, Rugova claimed that he had been under duress and any "agreement" with Milosovic had no meaning. The general opinion expected the DLK structures and its leader to vanish from the political scene of Kosovo after the Yugoslav withdrawal. Rugova himself stayed out of Kosovo for several weeks, while the prime-minister Bukoshi and other leading membership returned. With only a fraction of Kosovo Albanians participating actively in the war, the support for DLK increased again as a way of opposing the arrogance of many KLA leaders who openly engaged in controlling the economical and political life within the vacuum created right before the deployment of the United Nations Interim Administration Mission in Kosovo (UNMIK). In the October 2000 local elections, DLK was confirmed as the leading political party.

The feud between KLA and DLK continued in the post-war Kosovo. Many political activists of DLK were assassinated and the perpetrators not found, including Xhemajl Mustafa, Rugova's most trusted aide.

== Casualties ==
=== Civilian losses ===
In June 2000, the Red Cross reported that 3,368 civilians (mainly Kosovar Albanians, but with several hundred Serbs, and Roma) were still missing, nearly one year after the conflict, most of whom it concluded had to be 'presumed dead'.

A study by researchers from the Centers for Disease Control and Prevention in Atlanta, Georgia published in 2000 in medical journal the Lancet estimated that "12,000 deaths in the total population" could be attributed to war. This number was achieved by surveying 1,197 households from February 1998 through June 1999. 67 out of the 105 deaths reported in the sample population were attributed to war-related trauma, which extrapolates to be 12,000 deaths if the same war-related mortality rate is applied to Kosovo's total population. The highest mortality rates were in men between 15 and 49 (5,421 victims of war) as well as for men over 50 (5,176 victims). For persons younger than 15, the estimates were 160 victims for males and 200 for females. For women between 15 and 49 the estimate is that there were 510 victims; older than 50 years the estimate is 541 victims. The authors stated that it was not "possible to differentiate completely between civilian and military casualties".

In the 2008 joint study by the Humanitarian Law Centre (an NGO from Serbia and Kosovo), The International Commission on Missing Persons, and the Missing Person Commission of Serbia made a name-by-name list of war and post-war victims. According to the updated 2015 Kosovo Memory Book, 13,535 people were killed or missing due to the Kosovo conflict, from 1 January 1998 up until December 2000. Of these, 10,812 were Albanians, 2,197 Serbs and 526 Roma, Bosniaks, Montenegrins and others. 10,317 civilians were killed or went missing, of whom 8,676 were Albanians, 1,196 Serbs and 445 Roma and others. The remaining 3,218 dead or missing were combatants, including 2,131 members of the KLA and FARK, 1,084 members of Serbian forces and 3 members of KFOR. As of 2019, the book had been updated to a total of 13,548. In August 2017, the UN High Commissioner for Human Rights reported that between 1998 and 1999, more than 6,000 people had gone missing in Kosovo, and that 1,658 remained missing, with neither the person nor the body having, at that time, been found.

==== Civilians killed by NATO airstrikes ====
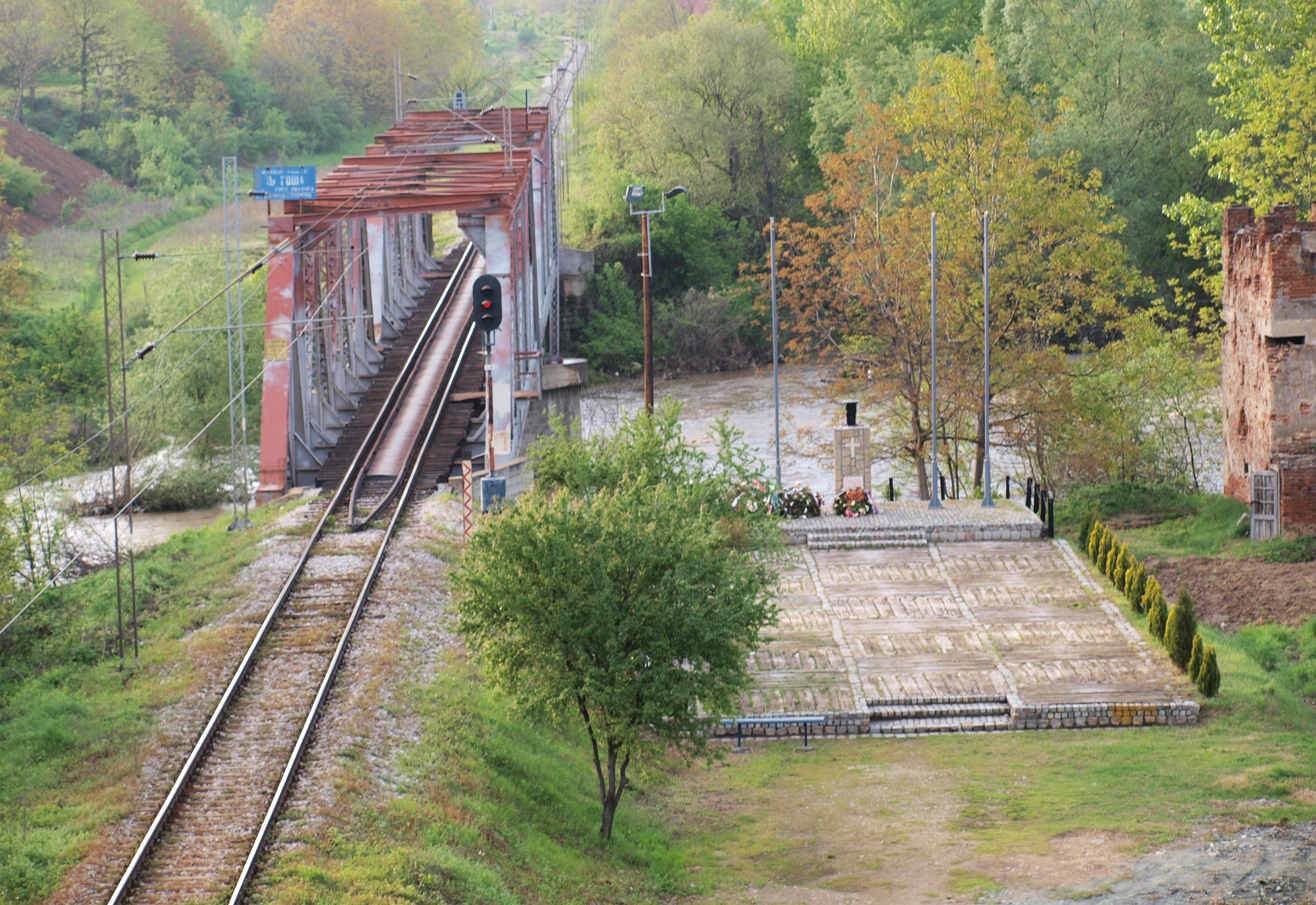
Railway bridge and monument to civilian victims of a NATO airstrike on a passenger train in 1999, in which 12 to 16 civilian passengers died

Yugoslavia claimed that NATO attacks caused between 1,200 and 5,700 civilian casualties. NATO's Secretary General, Lord Robertson, wrote after the war that "the actual toll in human lives will never be precisely known" but he then offered the figures found in a report by Human Rights Watch as a reasonable estimate. This report counted between 488 and 527 civilian deaths (90 to 150 of them killed from cluster bomb use) in 90 separate incidents, the worst of which were the 87 Albanian refugees who perished at the hands of NATO bombs, near Koriša.

==== Civilians killed by Yugoslav forces ====
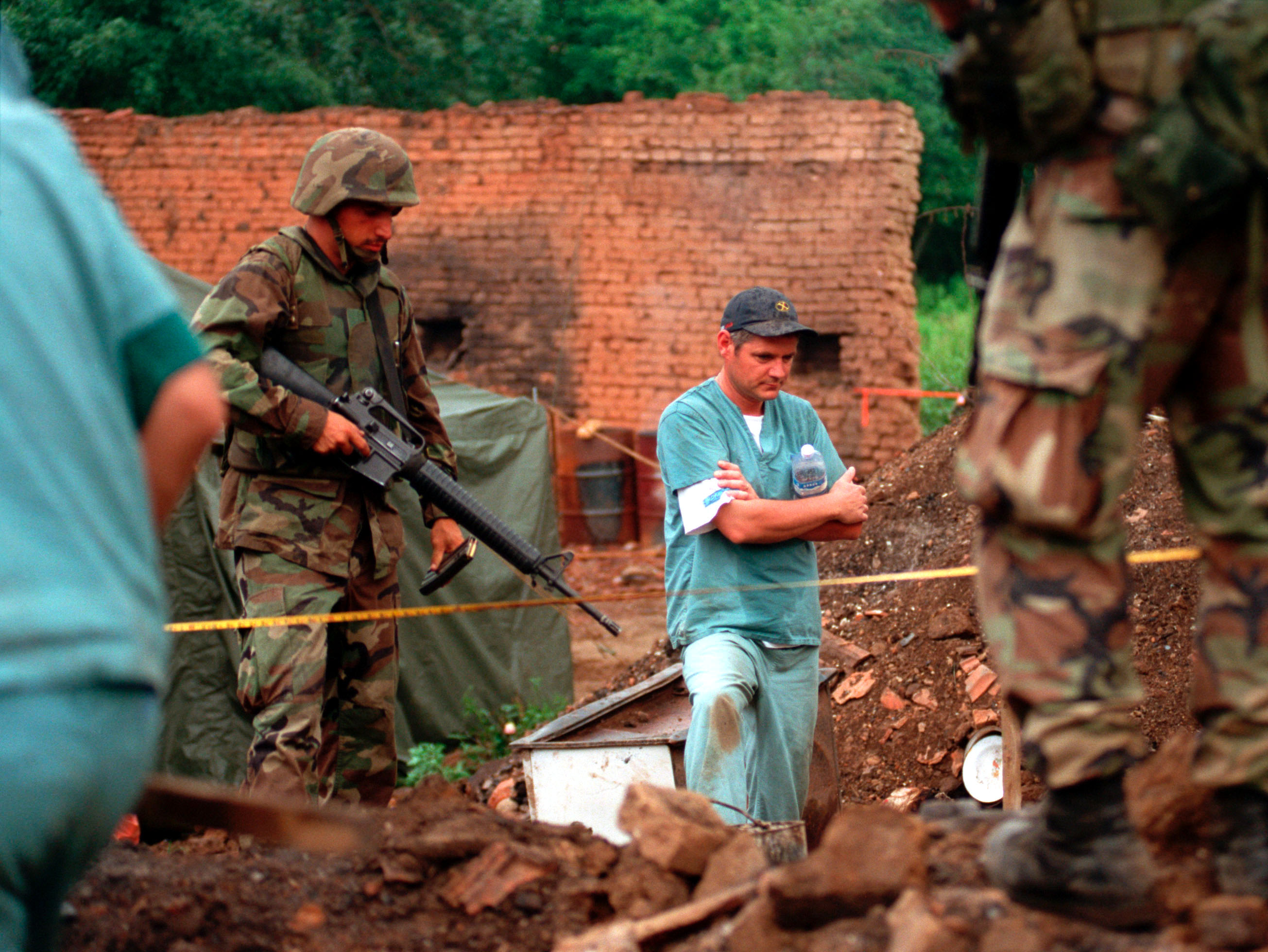
Royal Canadian Mounted Police (RCMP) officers investigate an alleged mass grave, alongside US Marines

Various estimates of the number of killings attributed to Yugoslav forces have been announced through the years. An estimated 800,000 Kosovo Albanians fled and an estimated 7,000 to 9,000 were killed, according to The New York Times. The estimate of 10,000 deaths is used by the US Department of State, which cited human rights abuses as its main justification for attacking Yugoslavia.

Statistical experts working on behalf of the ICTY prosecution estimate that the total number of dead is about 10,000. Eric Fruits, a professor at Portland State University, argued that the experts' analyses were based on fundamentally flawed data and that none of its conclusions are supported by any valid statistical analysis or tests.

In August 2000, the ICTY announced that it had exhumed 2,788 bodies in Kosovo, but declined to say how many were thought to be victims of war crimes. KFOR sources told Agence France Presse that of the 2,150 bodies that had been discovered up until July 1999, about 850 were thought to be victims of war crimes.

In an attempt to conceal the corpses of the victims, Yugoslav forces transported the bodies of murdered Albanians deep inside Serbia and buried them in mass graves. According to HLC, many of the bodies were taken to the Mačkatica Aluminium Complex near Surdulica and the Copper Mining And Smelting Complex in Bor, where they were incinerated. There are reports that some bodies of Albanian victims were also burned in the Feronikli plant in Glogovac.

Known mass graves:

- In 2001, 800 still unidentified bodies were found in pits on a police training ground just outside Belgrade and in eastern Serbia.
- At least 700 bodies were uncovered in a mass grave located within a special anti-terrorist police unit's compound in the Belgrade suburb of Batajnica.
- 77 bodies were found in the eastern Serbian town of Petrovo Selo.
- 50 bodies were uncovered near the western Serbian town of Peručac.
- A mass grave believed to contain 250 bodies of Albanians killed in the war has been found under a car park in Rudnica near Raška.
- At least 2 bodies, as well as part of the remains of a third body previously found in Rudnica have been found near a mine in the village of Kizevak in southern Serbia. The operation of recovering the bodies is still ongoing.

==== Civilians killed by KLA forces ====
The KLA abducted and killed Serbian, Roma, and moderate Albanian civilians during and after the war. The exact number of civilians killed by the KLA is not known, though estimates conducted in the initial post-war months listed several hundreds with the targeting of non-Albanians intensifying in the immediate aftermath of KFOR deployment. Although more than 2,500 non-Albanians are believed to have been killed in the period between 1 January 1998 and 31 December 2000, it is not known how many of them were killed by the KLA or affiliated groups.

=== NATO losses ===
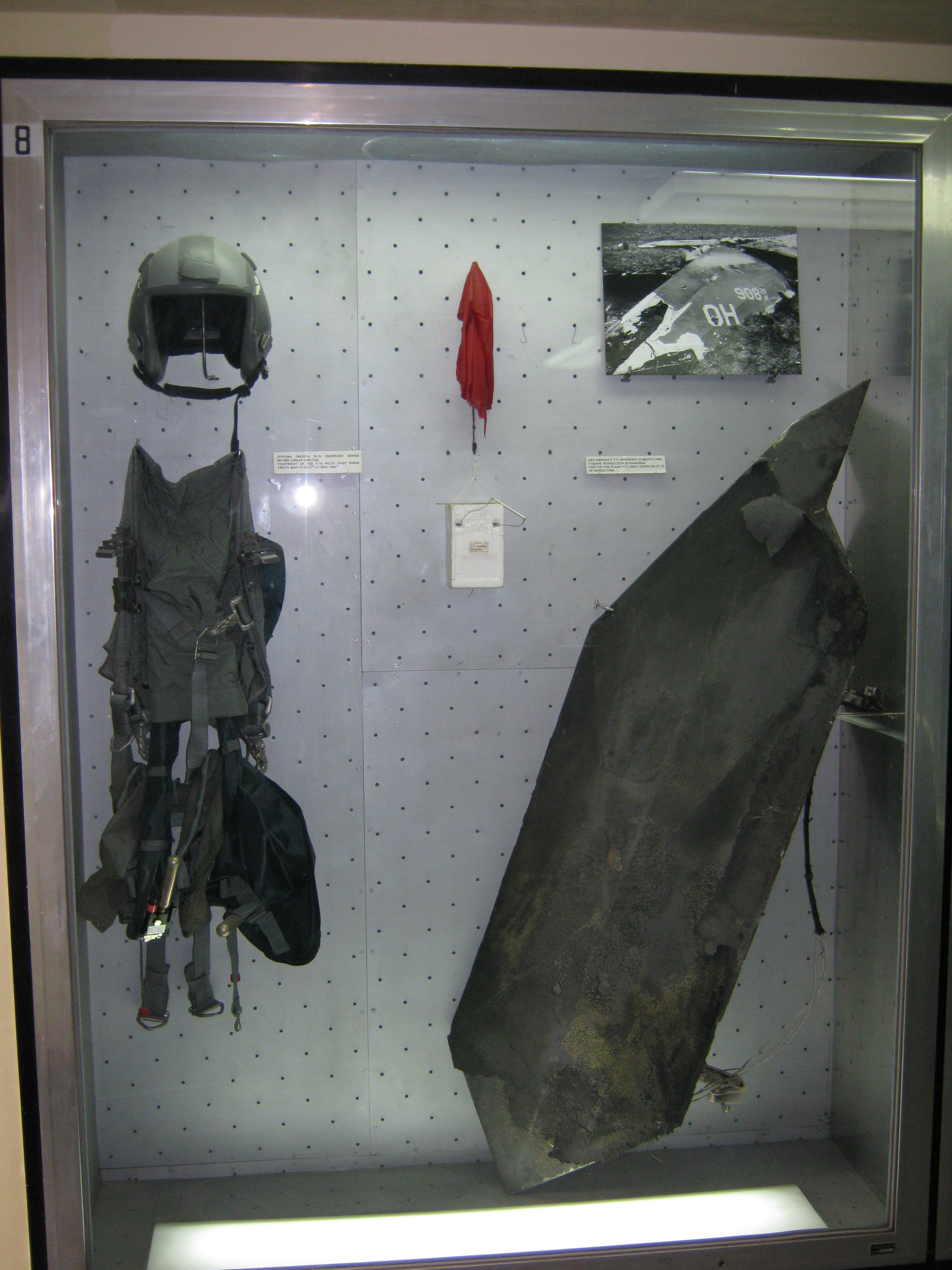
A downed F-16C pilot's flight equipment belonging to Lt. Colonel David L. Goldfein and part of the F-117A shot down over Serbia in 1999 on display at a Belgrade museum.

Military casualties on the NATO side were light. According to official reports, the alliance suffered no fatalities as a direct result of combat operations. In the early hours of 5 May, a US military AH-64 Apache helicopter crashed approximately 45 miles (72 km), according to CNN, or 40 miles (64 km), according to the BBC, northeast of Tirana, Albania's capital, very close to the border between Kosovo and Albania. The two US pilots of the helicopter, Army Chief Warrant Officers David Gibbs and Kevin L. Reichert, died in that crash. According to NATO statements, they were the only NATO fatalities during the war. However, British radio intercepts of Serbian military communications, said that several French foreign intelligence officers had been killed alongside KLA fighters in a Serbian ambush.

There were other casualties after the war, mostly due to land mines. During the war, the alliance reported the loss of the first US stealth aeroplane (an F-117 Nighthawk) ever shot down by enemy fire. Furthermore, an F-16 fighter was lost near Šabac and 32 unmanned aerial vehicles (UAVs) from different nations were lost. The wreckages of downed UAVs were shown on Serbian television during the war. Some US sources claim a second F-117A was also heavily damaged, and although it made it back to its base, it never flew again. A-10 Thunderbolts have been reported as losses, with two shot down and another two damaged. Three US soldiers riding a Humvee in a routine patrol were ambushed and captured, along with their vehicle and equipment, by Yugoslav special forces across the Macedonian border.

=== Yugoslav military losses ===
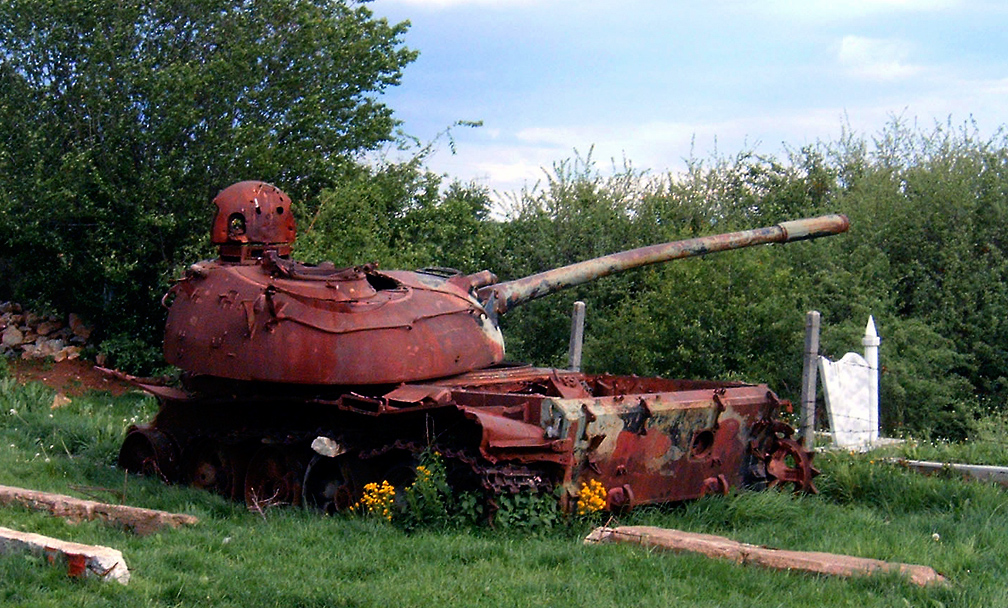
Destroyed tank near Prizren

At first, NATO claimed to have killed 10,000 Yugoslav troops, while Yugoslavia claimed only 500 had been killed; the NATO investigative teams later corrected it to a few hundred Yugoslav troops killed by air strikes. In 2001, the Yugoslav authorities claimed 462 soldiers were killed and 299 wounded by NATO airstrikes. Later, in 2013, Serbia claimed that 1,008 Yugoslav soldiers and policemen had been killed by NATO bombing. In early June 1999, NATO claimed that 5,000 Yugoslav servicemen had been killed and 10,000 had been wounded during the NATO air campaign. NATO has since lowered this estimate to 1,200 Yugoslav soldiers and policemen killed.

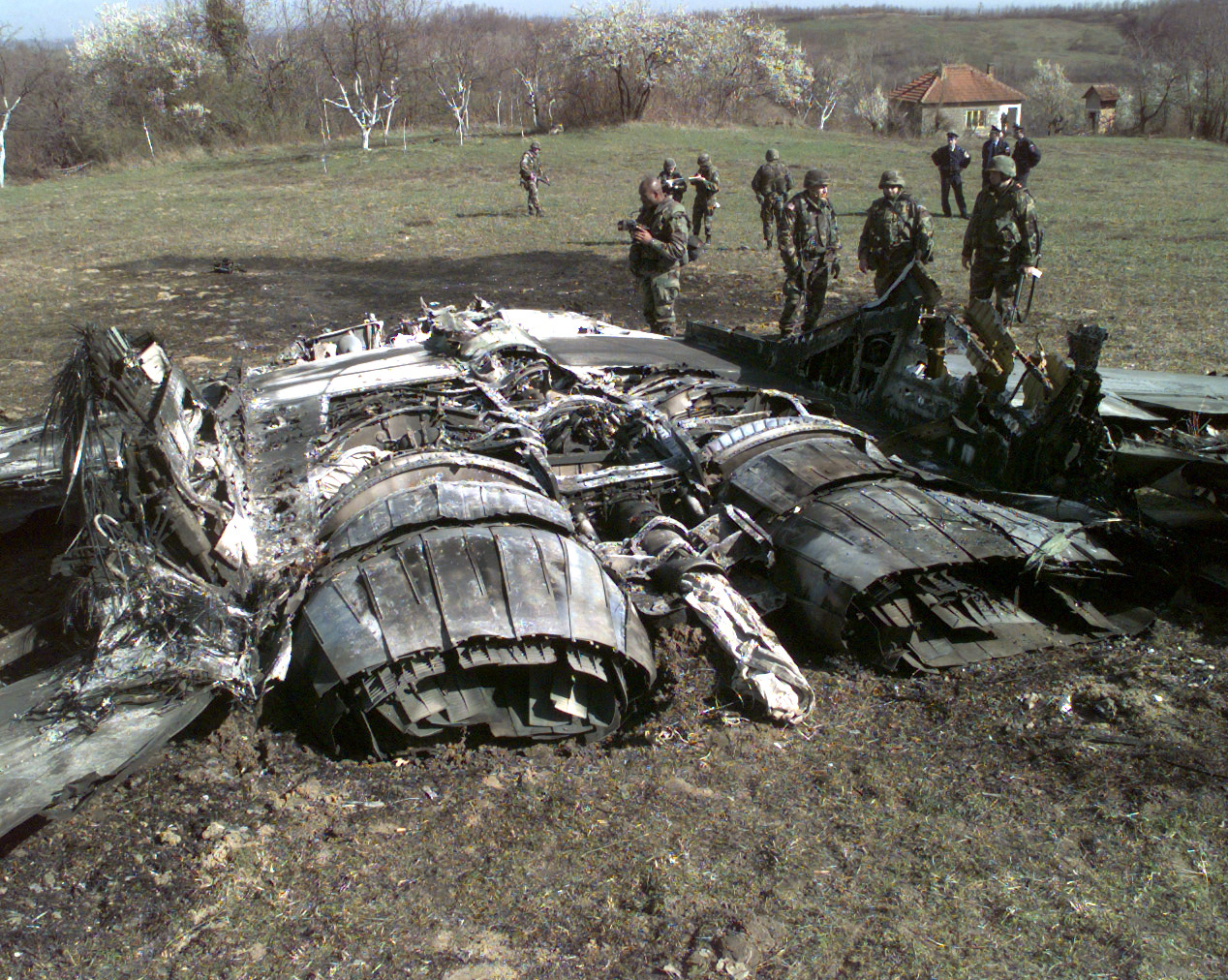
Wreckage of Yugoslav MiG-29 jet fighter shot down on 27 March 1999, outside the town of Ugljevik, Bosnia and Herzegovina

Of military equipment, NATO destroyed around 50 Yugoslav Air Force aircraft including 6 MiG-29s destroyed in air-to-air combat. A number of G-4 Super Galebs and 4 MiG-29s were destroyed in their hardened aircraft shelter by bunker-busting bombs which started a fire which spread quickly because the shelter doors were not closed. At the end of war, NATO officially claimed that they had destroyed 93 Yugoslav tanks. Yugoslavia admitted a total of 3 destroyed tanks. The latter figure was verified by European inspectors when Yugoslavia rejoined the Dayton accords, by noting the difference between the number of tanks then and at the last inspection in 1995. NATO claimed that the Yugoslav army lost 93 tanks (M-84's and T-55's), 132 APCs, and 52 artillery pieces. Newsweek, the second-largest news weekly magazine in the U.S., gained access to a suppressed US Air Force report that claimed the real numbers were "3 tanks, not 120; 18 armored personnel carriers, not 220; 20 artillery pieces, not 450". Another US Air Force report gives a figure of 14 tanks destroyed. Most of the targets hit in Kosovo were decoys, such as tanks made out of plastic sheets with telegraph poles for gun barrels, or old World War II–era tanks which were not functional. Anti-aircraft defences were preserved by the simple expedient of not turning them on, preventing NATO aircraft from detecting them, but forcing them to keep above a ceiling of 15,000 feet (4,600 metres), making accurate bombing much more difficult. Towards the end of the war, it was claimed that carpet bombing by B-52 aircraft had caused huge casualties among Yugoslav troops stationed along the Kosovo–Albania border. Careful searching by NATO investigators found no evidence of any such large-scale casualties.

The most significant loss for the Yugoslav Army was the damaged and destroyed infrastructure. Almost all military air bases and airfields (Batajnica, Lađevci, Slatina, Golubovci and Đakovica) and other military buildings and facilities were badly damaged or destroyed. Unlike the units and their equipment, military buildings could not be camouflaged. thus, defence industry and military technical overhaul facilities were also seriously damaged (Utva, Zastava Arms factory, Moma Stanojlović air force overhaul centre, technical overhaul centres in Čačak and Kragujevac). In an effort to weaken the Yugoslav Army, NATO targeted several important civilian facilities (the Pančevo oil refinery, Novi Sad oil refinery, bridges, TV antennas, railroads, etc.)

=== KLA losses ===
Around 1,500 Kosovo Liberation Army soldiers were killed, according to KLA's own estimates. HLC registered 2,131 KLA and FARK insurgents killed in its comprehensive database.

=== Environmental damage ===
Aside from the direct damage to humans and their built environment, there was damage to the natural and biophysical environment.

UNEP visited 12 locations and reported contamination in 4 hotspots: In Pancevo, an industrial town near Belgrade on the Danube river, a petrochemical plant, a fertiliser plant, and an oil refinery were bombed as "strategic targets". 1,2-dichloroethane and mercury were leaked, vinyl chloride monomer burnt and formed dioxins and the burning of oil reserves released sulphur dioxide and other hazardous gases. In Kragujevac, a car factory including its power station was bombed from the air. Several tonnes of transformer oil containing PCBs leaked into the Lepenica (Great Morava) River.

Similarly, in the Serbian town of Novi Sad about 73,000 tonnes of crude oil and oil products burnt or leaked into wastewater canals or into the ground, contaminating it with volatile hydrocarbons.

In the Serbian town of Bor a copper mine was hit in May 1998. Oil in the mines' transformers leaked, as did oil in its capacitors which contained PCBs and caused local contamination. There was chronic leaking of up to 100,000 tonnes of sulphur dioxide gas / year, because the normal recovery of the gas, as part the mine's copper production process, was interrupted,.

There were also localized areas of contamination, including in Kraljevo where underground diesel storage tanks were hit with the potential to leak into groundwater and the river Ibe. In Niš, transformer oil contaminated the soil. In Novi Beograd fuel tanks were destroyed leading to high concentrations of gasoline contaminated water flowing towards the Sava River. In the municipality of Obrenovac oil films were seen in fields after flooding. In Prahovo a bombed oil depot and a transformer station, leaked and burnt.

== Displacement and interethnic violence ==
=== Albanians ===
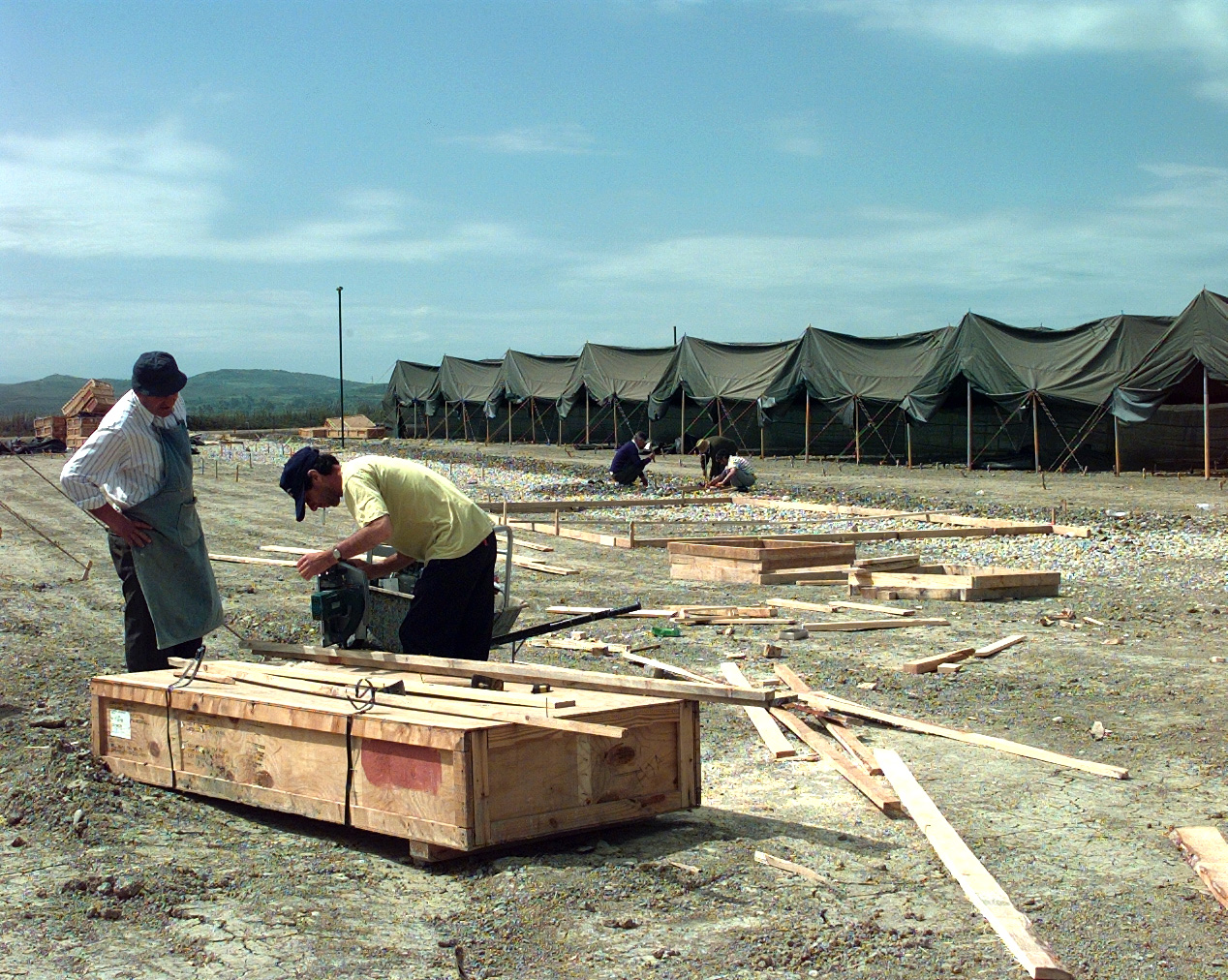
Refugee camp in Fier, Albania

The Yugoslav and Serb forces caused the displacement of between 1.2 million and 1.45 million Kosovo Albanians. After the end of the war in June 1999, numerous Albanian refugees started returning home from neighboring countries. By November 1999, according to the UN High Commissioner for Refugees, 848,100 out of 1,108,913 had returned.

Violence, including murders of ethnic Albanians, has been reported in the regions of Cubrelj and northern Mitrovica.

=== Serbs and Romani ===
According to the 1991 Yugoslavia Census, of the nearly 2 million population of Kosovo in 1991, 194,190 were Serbs, 45,745 were Romani, and 20,356 were Montenegrins. According to Human Rights Watch, 200,000 Serbs and thousands of Roma fled from Kosovo during and after the war. Homes of minorities were burned, and Orthodox churches and monasteries were destroyed. The Yugoslav Red Cross had also registered 247,391 mostly Serbian refugees by 26 November. More than 164,000 Serbs left Kosovo during the seven weeks that followed Yugoslav and Serb forces' withdrawal from, and the NATO-led Kosovo Force (KFOR) entering Kosovo.

Human Rights Watch criticized KFOR's protection of Serbs and Romani, describing it as "poor." According to a KFOR officer, abductions of Serbs and Romani were so prevalent that his unit stopped keeping track of them. Serbs were regularly the subject of killings, detentions, abductions, and harassment. Further inter-ethnic violence took place in 2000 and 2004.

=== Gorani and other Slavic Muslims ===
During and after June 1999, within the Gora region of Kosovo, Gorani homes were subjected to grenade attacks by Albanian civilians. Grenade attacks against Bosniaks were also reported in Prizren, Peja, and Istog. Alongside Serbs, Slavic Muslims were also displaced from their homes through harassment, intimidation, and violent attacks.

== War crimes ==
=== By the Federal Yugoslav government ===
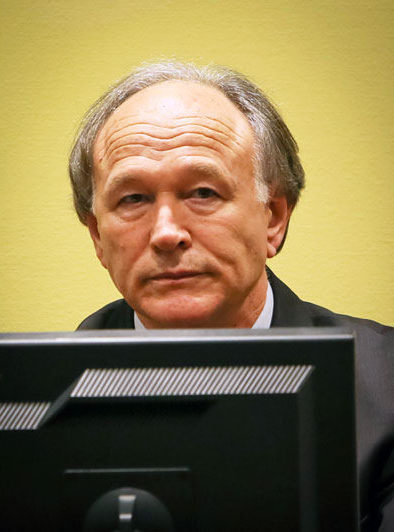
Vlastimir Đorđević, former Serb colonel general, at the ICTY

For the government of Serbia, cooperation with the International Criminal Tribunal for the Former Yugoslavia is "still regarded as a distressing obligation, the necessary price for joining the European Union". Religious objects were damaged or destroyed. Of the 498 mosques in Kosovo that were in active use, the ICTY documented that 225 mosques sustained damage or destruction by the Yugoslav Serb army. In all, eighteen months of the Yugoslav Serb counterinsurgency campaign between 1998 and 1999 within Kosovo resulted in 225 or a third out of a total of 600 mosques being damaged, vandalised, or destroyed. During the war, Islamic architectural heritage posed for Yugoslav Serb paramilitary and military forces as Albanian patrimony, with destruction of non-Serbian architectural heritage being a methodical and planned component of ethnic cleansing in Kosovo.

Widespread rape and sexual violence by the Serbian army, police and paramilitaries occurred during the conflict and the majority of victims were Kosovo Albanian women, numbering an estimated 20,000. The crimes of rape by the Serb military, paramilitary and police amounted to crimes against humanity and a war crime of torture.

On 27 April 1999, a mass execution of at least 377 Kosovo Albanian civilians, of whom 36 were under 18 years old, was committed by Serbian police and Yugoslav Army forces in the village of Meja near the town of Gjakova. It followed an operation which began after the killing of six Serbian policemen by the Kosovo Liberation Army (KLA). The victims were pulled from refugee convoys at a checkpoint in Meja and their families were ordered to proceed to Albania. Men and boys were separated and then executed by the road. It was one of the largest massacres in the Kosovo War.

Yugoslav President Slobodan Milošević was charged by the UN's ICTY with crimes against humanity and war crimes. In 2001, then-President Vojislav Koštunica "fought tooth and nail" against attempts to put Milošević before an international court but was unable to prevent this happening after further atrocities were revealed.

By 2014, the ICTY issued final verdicts against the indicted Yugoslav officials who were found guilty of deportation, other inhumane acts (forcible transfer), murder and persecutions (crimes against humanity, Article 5), as well as murder (violations of the laws or customs of war, Article 3):

- Nikola Šainović, former deputy prime minister of the FRY, sentenced to 18 years in prison.
- Dragoljub Ojdanić, former Chief of the General Staff of the Yugoslav Army, sentenced to 15 years in prison.
- Nebojša Pavković, former Commander of the Third Army of the Yugoslav Army, sentenced to 22 years in prison.
- Vladimir Lazarević, former Commander of the Priština Corps of the Yugoslav Army, sentenced to 14 years in prison.
- Sreten Lukić, former Head of the Serbian Ministry of Internal Affairs, sentenced to 20 years in prison.
- Vlastimir Đorđević, former Assistant Minister of the Serbian Ministry of Internal Affairs (MUP) and Chief of the Public Security Department (RJB) of the MUP, was sentenced to 18 years in prison.
- Milan Milutinović was acquitted of all charges.
- Vlajko Stojiljković committed suicide.
- Slobodan Milošević died before a verdict was reached.

The ICTY found that:

...FRY and Serbian forces use[d] violence and terror to force a significant number of Kosovo Albanians from their homes and across the borders, in order for the state authorities to maintain control over Kosovo ... This campaign was conducted by army and Interior Ministry police forces (MUP) under the control of FRY and Serbian authorities, who were responsible for mass expulsions of Kosovo Albanian civilians from their homes, as well as incidents of killings, sexual assault, and the intentional destruction of mosques.

=== By Kosovo Albanian forces ===
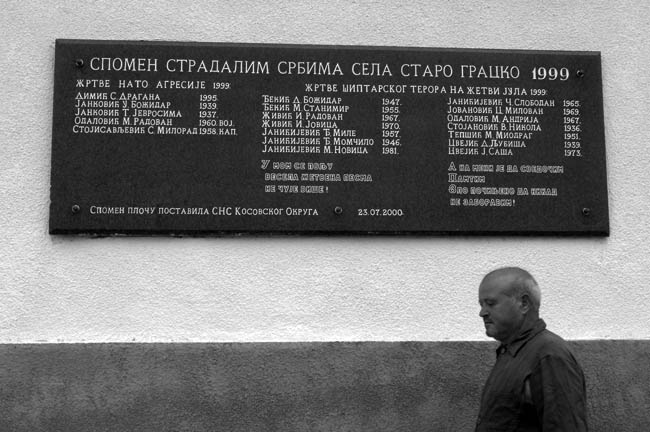
Staro Gracko massacre memorial

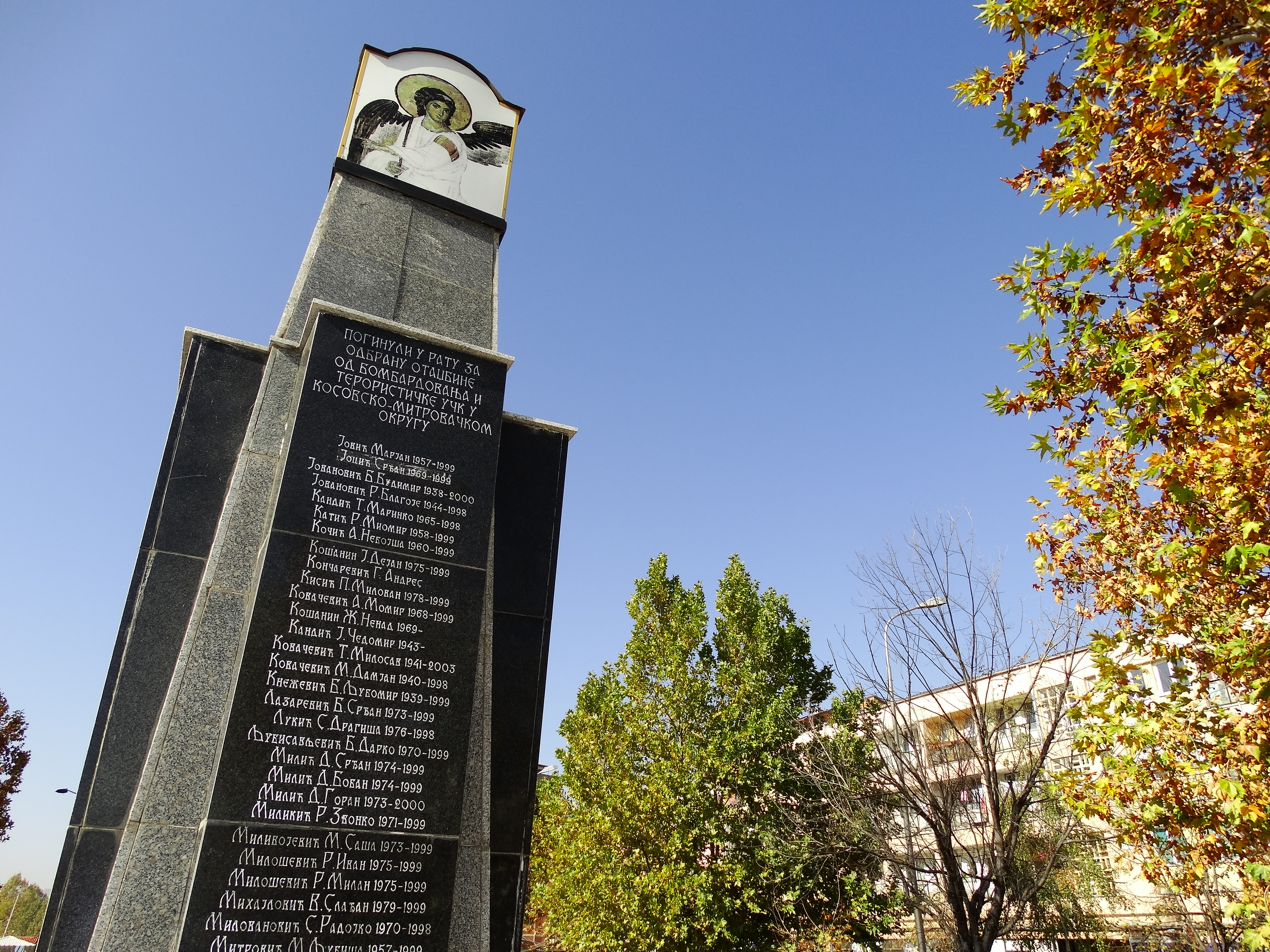
Monument to Serbian victims of Kosovo War in Mitrovica

On 30 November 2005. the ICTY convicted KLA commander Haradin Bala for murder, torture and cruel treatment in the Lapušnik prison camp, and sentencted him to 13 years’ imprisonment. Fatmir Limaj and Isak Musliu were acquitted.

In March 2005, a UN tribunal indicted Kosovo Prime Minister Ramush Haradinaj for war crimes against the Serbs. On 8 March, he tendered his resignation. Haradinaj, an ethnic Albanian, was a former commander who led units of the Kosovo Liberation Army and was appointed prime minister after winning an election of 72 votes to three in the Kosovo's Parliament in December 2004. Haradinaj was acquitted on all counts along with fellow KLA veterans Idriz Balaj and Lahi Brahimaj. The Office of the Prosecutor appealed their acquittals, resulting in the ICTY ordering a partial retrial. On 29 November 2012 all three were acquitted for the second time on all charges. The trials were rife with accusations of witness intimidation, as media outlets from several different countries wrote that as many as nineteen people who were supposed to be witnesses in the trial against Haradinaj had been murdered. The ICTY dismissed the claims.

In 2026 at The Hague, Hashim Thaçi, a senior KLA leader during the conflict, was convicted and sentenced to 25 years' imprisonment for war crimes. He was found guilty of the murder of 96 political opponents and alleged collaborators with Serbian forces in the 1990s, illegal detention of 385 people, torture of 303 and of the cruel treatment of 49 as part of a joint criminal enterprise. He was cleared of six charges of crimes against humanity.

In 2008, Carla Del Ponte published a book in which she alleged that, after the end of the war in 1999, Kosovo Albanians were smuggling organs of between 100 and 300 Serbs and other minorities from the province to Albania. In 2021 Del Ponte said that the US for political reasons, had not wanted the ICTY to scrutinise war crimes committed by the KLA. According to her, Madeleine Albright who was the Secretary of State at the time told her to proceed slowly with the investigation of Ramush Haradinaj to avoid unrest in Kosovo. A request, she said, she had ignored

According to Human Rights Watch (HRW), "800 non-Albanian civilians were kidnapped and murdered from 1998 to 1999". After the war, "479 people have gone missing... most of them Serbs". HRW notes that "the intent behind many of the killings and abductions that have occurred in the province since June 1999 appears to be the expulsion of Kosovo's Serb and Roma population rather than a desire for revenge alone. In numerous cases, direct and systematic efforts were made to force Serbs and Roma to leave their homes." Some 200,000 Serbs and Roma fled Kosovo following the withdrawal of Yugoslav forces.

In April 2014, the Assembly of Kosovo considered and approved the establishment of a special court to try cases involving crimes and other serious abuses committed in 1999–2000 by members of the KLA. Reports of abuses and war crimes committed by the KLA during and after the conflict include massacres of civilians, prison camps, burning and looting of homes and destruction of medieval churches and monuments.

=== By NATO forces ===
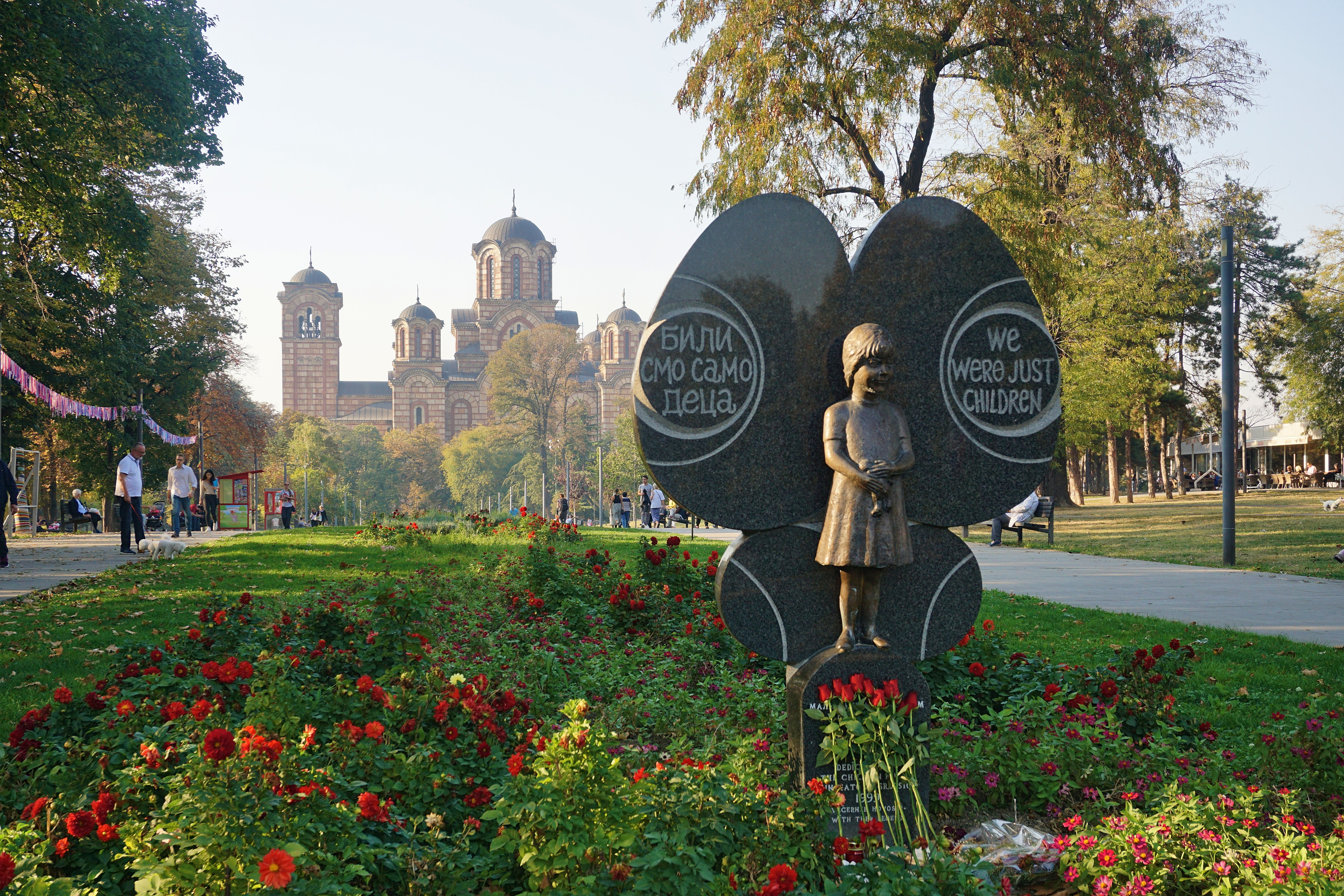
A monument to the children killed in the NATO bombing located in Tašmajdan Park, Belgrade, featuring a bronze sculpture of Milica Rakić

The Yugoslav government and a number of international pressure groups (e.g., Amnesty International) claimed that NATO had carried out war crimes during the conflict, notably the bombing of the Serbian TV headquarters in Belgrade on 23 April 1999, where 16 people were killed and 16 more were injured. Sian Jones of Amnesty stated, "The bombing of the headquarters of Serbian state radio and television was a deliberate attack on a civilian object and as such constitutes a war crime". A report conducted by the ICTY entitled Final Report to the Prosecutor by the Committee Established to Review the NATO Bombing Campaign Against the Federal Republic of Yugoslavia concluded that, "Insofar as the attack actually was aimed at disrupting the communications network, it was legally acceptable" and that, "NATO's targeting of the RTS building for propaganda purposes was an incidental (albeit complementary) aim of its primary goal of disabling the Serbian military command and control system and to destroy the nerve system and apparatus that keeps Milosević in power." In regards to civilian casualties, it further stated that though they were, "unfortunately high, they do not appear to be clearly disproportionate."

== International reaction to NATO intervention ==
=== Africa ===
- – Egypt supported NATO intervention in Kosovo and withdrew its ambassador from Belgrade.
- (History of Libya under Muammar Gaddafi) – Libyan Jamahiriya leader, Muammar Gaddafi opposed the campaign and called on world leaders to support Yugoslavia's 'legitimate right to defend its freedoms and territorial integrity against a possible aggression.'

=== Asia ===
- – Cambodia was against the campaign.
- – China deeply condemned the bombing, saying it was an act of aggression against the Yugoslav people, especially when NATO bombed its embassy in Belgrade on 7 May 1999, riots and mass demonstrations against the governments of the United States and Great Britain were reported against both the attack and the operation overall. Jiang Zemin, the President of the country at the time, called 'once more' for an immediate halt to the airstrikes and demanded peaceful negotiations.
- – India condemned the bombing. The Indian foreign ministry also stated that it 'urged all military actions to be brought to a halt' and that 'FR Yugoslavia be enabled to resolve its internal issues internally.'
- – Indonesia was against the campaign.
- – Israel did not support the 1999 NATO bombing of Yugoslavia. Ariel Sharon criticised NATO's bombing as an act of "brutal interventionism". It was suggested that Sharon may have supported the Yugoslav position because of the Serbian population's history of saving Jews during the Holocaust.
- – Jordan supported NATO intervention in Kosovo and withdrew its ambassador from Belgrade.
- – Japan's PM Keizō Obuchi advocated the bombing, stating that Yugoslavia had an 'uncompromising attitude.' Japan's foreign minister Masahiko Kōmura said that, 'Japan understands NATO's use of force as measures that had to be taken to prevent humanitarian catastrophe.'
- – Malaysia supported the bombing, stating that it 'was necessary to prevent genocide in Kosovo.'
- – Pakistan's government was concerned about developing situations in Kosovo and called for UN intervention.
- – United Arab Emirates supported NATO intervention in Kosovo. The UAE population gave financial aid, and set up and ran a refugee camp and built an airstrip for incoming relief supplies at Kukës in Northern Albania.
- – Vietnam was against the bombing campaign.

=== Europe ===
- – Albania strongly supported the bombing campaign. This resulted in the breaking of diplomatic ties between Albania and the Federal Republic of Yugoslavia, who accused the Albanian government of harbouring KLA insurgents and supplying them with weapons.
- – Turkey, a NATO member, supported and was involved in the bombing campaign though it expressed hesitation about a ground offensive. The Turkish government stressed that NATO's involvement was not about undermining Yugoslav territorial integrity, but about reversing the genocidal policies of the Milošević government. The Turkish population, as a result of historical, cultural, and religious ties to the Balkans felt a responsibility to assist Kosovo Albanians by supporting their government's position.
- – Greece took no active part in the NATO campaign and 96% of the Greek population was opposed to the NATO bombings.
- – In France, the bulk of the population supported the action but factions on the far left and far right opposed it.
- – Slobodan Milošević, the president of the Federal Republic of Yugoslavia called the bombings, an 'unlawful act of terrorism' and the 'key to colonize Yugoslavia'. The Yugoslav population also strongly opposed the bombing. Milošević stated that, 'the only correct decision that could have been made was the one to reject foreign troops on our territory.' The Yugoslavs who opposed Milošević also opposed the bombing, saying that it 'supports Milošević rather than attacking him.'
- (Germany) – Chancellor Gerhard Schroeder newly elected government supported the NATO campaign; German public opinion was not prepared for a prolonged campaign.
- – The bombing was met with mixed reactions in Italy. Following former prime minister Romano Prodi's decision to allow coalition forces to use Italian airbases and military infrastructures, Massimo D'Alema's centre-left government authorised the country's participation in the air campaign. The bombing was also supported by Silvio Berlusconi and the centre-right opposition. Domestic opposition to the NATO bombing campaign against Serbia was strong.
- – Russia strongly condemned the campaign. President Boris Yeltsin stated that, 'Russia is deeply upset by NATO's military action against sovereign Yugoslavia, which is nothing more than open aggression.' They also condemned NATO at the United Nations saying that NATO air strikes on Serbia were 'an illegal action.' Some Russians volunteered to go to Kosovo, not only to fight the KLA, but also to oppose NATO.
- – As a contributor to the bombing, the United Kingdom strongly supported the bombing campaign, as did a majority of the British population.
- – The Polish government sanctioned NATO's activities but Poland did not participate in the operation There were demonstrations in Warsaw against the bombing.
- – Bulgaria allowed its airspace to be used by NATO aircraft for attacks. Despite Bulgaria's ambitions of joining both NATO and the European Union, the leftist opposition organised street protests in Sofia over the NATO bombing of Yugoslavia, the public was reportedly deeply divided because of sympathy for their fellow Slavs and Christian Orthodox Serb neighbours but also a desire to join the European Union and NATO. Several NATO missiles and aircraft strayed off course into Bulgaria.
- – Romania allowed NATO planes to use Romanian airspace to strike targets in Serbia. Supporting NATO during the Yugoslav Wars got Romania's position as an official NATO member in 2004. However, an overwhelming majority of Romanian citizens strongly opposed the NATO bombing campaign.

=== Oceania ===
- – Australia supported the campaign. Prime Minister John Howard stated that, "history has told us that if you sit by and do nothing, you pay a much greater price later on."

=== United Nations ===
- – The United Nations had mixed reactions to the bombing, which was carried out without its authorisation. Kofi Annan, the UN Secretary-General said, "In spite of all the efforts made by the international community, the Yugoslav authorities have persisted in their rejection of a political settlement ... it is indeed tragic that diplomacy has failed, but there are times when the use of force is legitimate in the pursuit of peace" adding that "the [UN Security] Council should be involved in any decision to resort to the use of force."

== Military and political consequences ==
The Kosovo War had a number of important consequences in terms of the military and political outcome. After the entry of KFOR troops and the adoption of UN Security Council Resolution 1244, the Security Council placed Kosovo under the temporary administration of the United Nations Mission in Kosovo (UNMIK), which would be responsible for governing the territory under the leadership of a Special Representative of the Secretary-General.

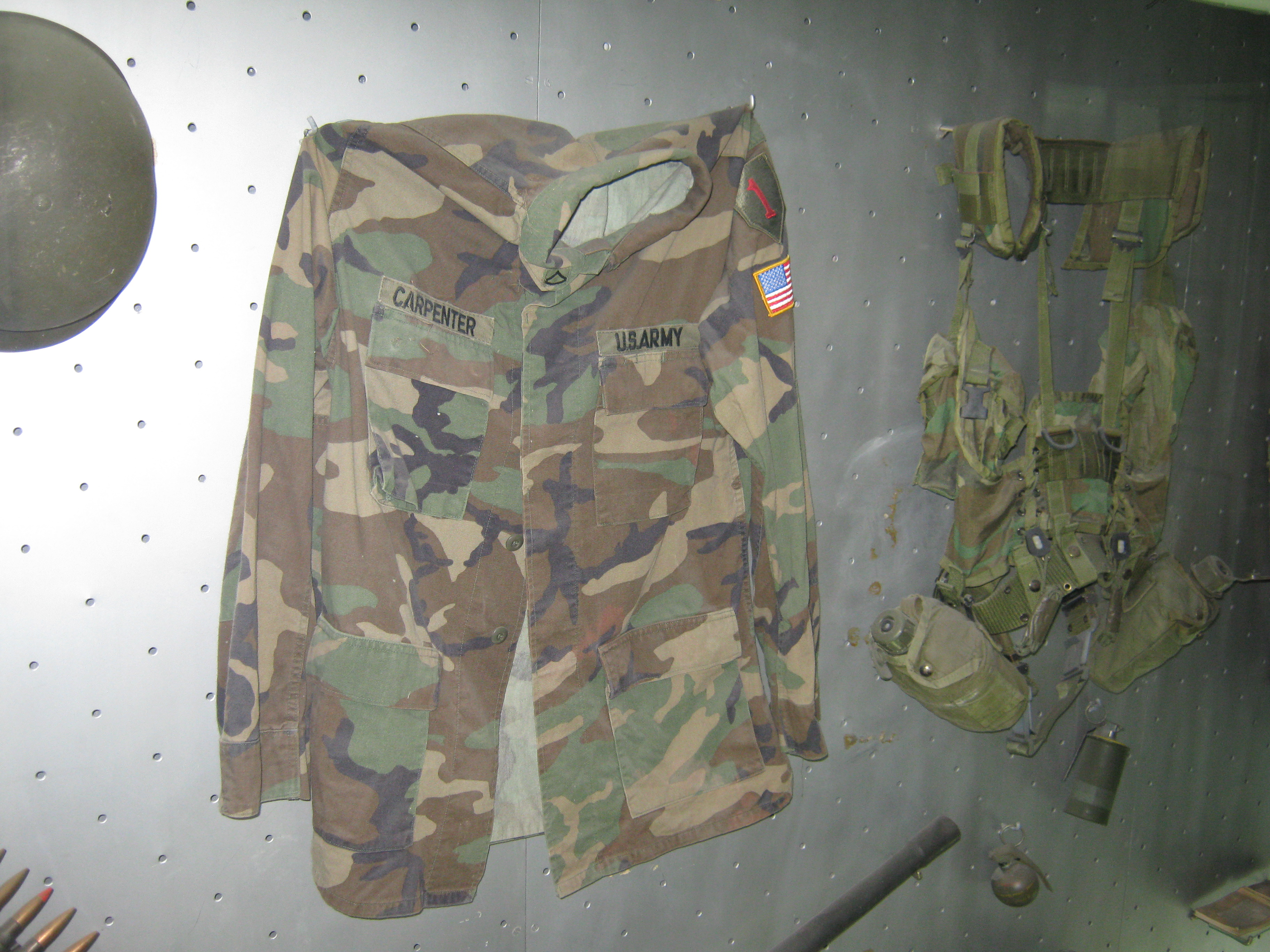
Seized uniform and equipment of US soldiers 1999 in Kosovo War

UN-backed talks in order to determine Kosovo's status, led by UN Special Envoy Martti Ahtisaari, had begun in February 2006. Whilst progress was made on technical matters, both parties remained diametrically opposed on the question of status itself. In February 2007, Ahtisaari delivered a draft status settlement proposal to leaders in Belgrade and Pristina, the basis for a draft UN Security Council Resolution which proposes "supervised independence" for the province, which is in contrary to UN Security Council Resolution 1244. By July 2007, the draft resolution, which was backed by the United States, United Kingdom, and other European members of the Security Council, had been rewritten four times to try to accommodate Russian concerns that such a resolution would undermine the principle of state sovereignty. Russia, which holds a veto in the Security Council as one of five permanent members, stated that it would not support any resolution which is not acceptable to both Belgrade and Priština. On 17 February 2008, Kosovo unilaterally declared its independence.

The campaign exposed significant weaknesses in the US arsenal, which were later addressed for the Afghanistan and Iraq campaigns. Apache attack helicopters and AC-130 Spectre gunships were brought up to the front lines but were never used after two Apaches crashed during training in the Albanian mountains. Stocks of many precision missiles were reduced to critically low levels. For combat aircraft, continuous operations resulted in skipped maintenance schedules, and many aircraft were withdrawn from service awaiting spare parts and service. Also, many of the precision-guided weapons proved unable to cope with Balkan weather, as the clouds blocked the laser guidance beams. This was resolved by retrofitting bombs with Global Positioning System satellite guidance devices that are immune to bad weather. Although pilotless surveillance aircraft were extensively used, often attack aircraft could not be brought to the scene quickly enough to hit targets of opportunity. This led missiles being fitted to Predator drones in Afghanistan, reducing the "sensor to shooter" time to virtually zero.

Kosovo also showed that some low-tech tactics could reduce the impact of a high-tech force such as NATO; the Milošević government cooperated with Saddam Hussein's Ba'athist regime in Iraq, passing on many of the lessons learned in the Gulf War. The Yugoslav army had long expected to need to resist a much stronger enemy, either Soviet or NATO, during the Cold War and had developed tactics of deception and concealment in response. These would have been unlikely to have resisted a full-scale invasion for long, but were probably used to mislead overflying aircraft and satellites. Among the tactics used were:

- US stealth aeroplanes were tracked with radars operating on long wavelengths. If stealth jets got wet or opened their bomb bay doors, they would become visible on the radar screens. The downing of an F-117 Nighthawk by a missile was possibly spotted in this way.
- Dummy targets such as fake bridges, airfields and decoy aeroplanes and tanks were used extensively. Tanks were made using old tires, plastic sheeting and logs, and sand cans and fuel set alight to mimic heat missions. Serbia claims they fooled NATO pilots into bombing hundreds of decoys, though General Clark's survey found that in Operation: Allied Force, NATO airmen hit 25 decoys compared to 974 validated hits. NATO sources claim that this was due to operating procedures, which oblige troops, in this case aircraft, to engage any and all targets, however unlikely they may be. The targets needed only to look real to be shot at when detected. NATO claimed that the Yugoslav air force was devastated: "Official data show that the Yugoslav army in Kosovo lost 26 percent of its tanks, 34 percent of its APCs, and 47 percent of the artillery to the air campaign."

== Military decorations ==
As a result of the Kosovo War, the North Atlantic Treaty Organization created a second NATO medal, the NATO Medal for Kosovo Service, an international military decoration. Shortly thereafter, NATO created the Non-Article 5 Medal for Balkans service to combine both Yugoslavian and Kosovo operations into one service medal.

Due to the involvement of the United States armed forces, a separate US military decoration, known as the Kosovo Campaign Medal, was established by President Bill Clinton in 2000.

The Kosovo Campaign Medal (KCM) is a military award of the United States Armed Forces established by Executive Order 13154 of President Bill Clinton on 3 May 2000. The medal recognises military service performed in Kosovo from 24 March 1999 through 31 December 2013.

== See also ==
- Albania–Yugoslav border incident
- Destruction of Albanian heritage in Kosovo
- Destruction of Serbian heritage in Kosovo
- Insurgency in the Preševo Valley
- Operation Horseshoe
- State Security Service (Serbia)
- 2004 unrest in Kosovo

== Sources ==
- Abrahams, Fred (2001). Under Orders: War Crimes in Kosovo. Human Rights Watch. ISBN 978-1-56432-264-7.
- Bacevich, Andrew J.; Cohen, Elliot A. (2001). War Over Kosovo: Politics and Strategy in a Global Age. Columbia University Press. ISBN 978-0231500524.
- Daalder, Ivo H.; O'Hanlon, Michel E. (2000). Winning Ugly: NATO's War to Save Kosovo. Brookings Institution Press. ISBN 978-0815798422.
- Dannreuther, Roland (2001). "Perceptions in the Middle East". In Buckley, Mary; Cummings, Sally (eds.). Kosovo: Perceptions of War and Its Aftermath. A&C Black. ISBN 978-0826456694.
- Elsie, Robert (2010). Historical Dictionary of Kosovo. Scarecrow Press. ISBN 978-0-8108-7483-1.
- Herscher, Andrew; Riedlmayer, András (2000). "Monument and crime: The destruction of historic architecture in Kosovo". Grey Room. 1 (1): 108–122. doi:10.1162/152638100750173083. JSTOR 1262553. S2CID 57566872.
- Judah, Tim (2002). Kosovo: War and Revenge. New Haven and London: Yale University Press. ISBN 978-0-30009-725-2.
- Krieger, Heike, ed. (2001). The Kosovo Conflict and International Law: An Analytical Documentation 1974–1999. Cambridge University Press. ISBN 978-0521800716.
- Klip, André; Sluiter, Göran (2001). The International Criminal Tribunal for the former Yugoslavia 1997–1999. Annotated Leading Cases of International Criminal Tribunals. Vol. 3. ISBN 978-90-5095-141-8.
- Malcolm, Noel (1998). Kosovo: A Short History. Macmillan. ISBN 978-0-333-66612-8.
- Macdonald, Scott (2007). Propaganda and Information Warfare in the Twenty-First Century: Altered Images and Deception Operations. Routledge. ISBN 978-1135983512.
- Meier, Viktor (1999). Yugoslavia: A History of Its Demise. New York: Routledge. ISBN 0-415-18595-5.
- Mincheva, Lyubov Grigorova; Gurr, Ted Robert (2013). Crime-Terror Alliances and the State: Ethnonationalist and Islamist Challenges to Regional Security. Routledge. ISBN 978-0-415-50648-9.
- Reveron, Derek S.; Murer, Jeffrey Stevenson (2006). Flashpoints in the War on Terrorism. Taylor & Francis. ISBN 978-0-415-95491-4.
- Thomas, Nigel (2006). The Yugoslav Wars (2): Bosnia, Kosovo And Macedonia 1992–2001. Osprey Publishing. ISBN 978-1841769646.
