= Biljana (name) =

Biljana (Serbian: Биљана [bǐʎana]; Macedonian: Билјана; Bulgarian: Биляна [biˈʎanɐ]) is a feminine South Slavic name derived from бела, бяла ("white", "fair") or билка, биле ("medicinal herb"). It is usually found in Serbia, Croatia, North Macedonia and Bulgaria. Notable people with the name include:

- Biljana Borzan (born 1971), Croatian physician and politician
- Biljana Bradić (born 1991), Serbian footballer
- Biljana Čekić (born 2007), Serbian actress
- Biljana Coković (1982–2007), Macedonian swimmer
- Biljana Crvenkoska (born 1983), Macedonian handball player
- Biljana Dekic, Yugoslav-born Australian chess Woman International Master
- Biljana Dojčinović (born 1963), Serbian feminist academic
- Biljana Dragić (born 1984), Serbian politician
- Biljana Filipović (born 1986), Serbian handball player
- Biljana Gligorović (born 1982), Croatian volleyball player
- Biljana Golić (born 1977), Serbian table tennis player
- Biljana Ilić Stošić (born 1964), Serbian politician
- Biljana Jakovljević (born 1988), Serbian politician
- Biljana Jovanović (1953–1996), Serbian author, peace activist and feminist
- Biljana Kovačević-Vučo (1952–2010), Serbian human rights and anti-war activist
- Biljana Bilja Krstić (born 1955), Serbian singer
- Biljana Majstorović (born 1959), Serbian basketball player
- Biljana D. Obradović (born 1961), Serbian-American poet, critic, translator and professor
- Biljana Pantić Pilja (born 1983), Serbian politician
- Biljana Pavićević (disambiguation), multiple people
- Biljana Pawlowa-Dimitrova (born 1978), Bulgarian tennis player
- Biljana Petrović (born 1961), Serbian retired high jumper
- Biljana Plavšić (born 1930), Bosnian Serb former politician, university professor and convicted war criminal
- Biljana Relić (born 1998), Serbian sprint canoer
- Biljana Rubaković (born 1960), Serbian politician
- Biljana Savović (born 1960), Serbian politician
- Biljana Šljivić-Šimšić (1933–2019), Yugoslavian-American professor
- Biljana Srbljanović (born 1970), Serbian playwright and university professor
- Biljana Stojković (born 1972), Serbian biologist, activist, professor and politician
- Biljana Stanković (born 1974), Serbian basketball coach and player
- Biljana Topić (born 1977), Serbian triple jumper and sprinter
- Biljana Vraneš (born 1999), Montenegrin footballer

== See also ==
- Biljana platno beleše, the folk song
