= Battle of Podujevo =

Battle in 1998

- Part of the Kosovo War
Date	23–27 December 1998
Location	Podujevo, Kosovo, Yugoslavia 42.91056°N 21.19306°E
Result	Yugoslav victory: Yugoslav forces capture Podujevo

Belligerents
FR Yugoslavia	Kosovo Liberation Army

Commanders and leaders
(Serbia and Montenegro) Sreten Lukić (Federal Republic of Yugoslavia) Vlastimir Đorđević (Federal Republic of Yugoslavia) Janko Lazarević	Kadri Kastrati

Units involved
(Federal Republic of Yugoslavia) Yugoslav Army: 5th Military Police Battalion; Special Anti-Terrorist Unit	Shala Operational Zone

Strength
(Serbia and Montenegro) 250 policemen (Serbia and Montenegro) 13+ armored vehicles (Serbia and Montenegro) T-55 and M-84 tanks	25 militants

Casualties and losses
(Federal Republic of Yugoslavia) 1 killed (Federal Republic of Yugoslavia) 6 wounded (Federal Republic of Yugoslavia) 2 APC's destroyed	10 killed

The Battle of Podujevo (Albanian: Beteja e Tabeve te Llapashticës; Serbian: Битка код Подујева, Bitka kod Podujeva) was fought in the Kosovo War between the Yugoslav Special Anti-Terrorist Unit and KLA insurgents in the village of Llapashtica e Epërme in the municipality of Podujevo. These events started after the death of a policeman who was killed by KLA militants in the area.

== Background ==
Following World War II, Kosovo was given the status of an autonomous province within the Socialist Republic of Serbia, one of six constitutional republics of the Socialist Federal Republic of Yugoslavia. After the death of Yugoslavia's long-time leader (Josip Broz Tito) in 1980, Yugoslavia's political system began to unravel. In 1989, Belgrade revoked Kosovo's autonomy. Kosovo, a province inhabited predominantly by ethnic Albanians, was of great historical and cultural significance to Serbs, who had formed a majority there before the mid-19th century, but by 1990 represented only about 10 percent of the population. Alarmed by their dwindling numbers, the province's Serbs began to fear that they were being "squeezed out" by the Albanians, and ethnic tensions worsened. As soon as Kosovo's autonomy was abolished, a minority government run by Serbs and Montenegrins was appointed by Serbian President Slobodan Milošević to oversee the province, enforced by thousands of heavily armed paramilitaries from Serbia-proper. Albanian culture was systematically repressed and hundreds of thousands of Albanians working in state-owned companies lost their jobs.

In 1996, a group of Albanian nationalists calling themselves the Kosovo Liberation Army (KLA) began attacking the Yugoslav Army (Serbo-Croatian: Vojska Jugoslavije; VJ) and the Serbian Ministry of Internal Affairs (Serbo-Croatian: Ministarstvo unutrašnjih poslova; MUP) in Kosovo. Their goal was to separate the province from the rest of Yugoslavia, which following the separation of Slovenia, Croatia, Macedonia and Bosnia-Herzegovina in 1991–92, was just a rump federation consisting of Serbia and Montenegro. At first, the KLA carried out hit-and-run attacks (31 in 1996, 55 in 1997, and 66 in January and February 1998 alone). It quickly gained popularity among young Kosovo Albanians, many of whom rejected the non-violent resistance to Yugoslav authorities advocated by the politician Ibrahim Rugova and favoured a more aggressive approach. The organization received a significant boost in 1997, when an armed uprising in neighbouring Albania led to thousands of weapons from the Albanian Army's depots being looted. Many of these weapons ended up in the hands of the KLA. The KLA also received substantial funds from its involvement in the drug trade.

The KLA's popularity skyrocketed after the VJ and MUP attacked the compound of KLA leader Adem Jashari in March 1998, killing him, his closest associates and most of his family. The attack prompted thousands of young Kosovo Albanians to join the ranks of the KLA, fueling the Kosovar uprising that eventually erupted in the spring of 1998.

Podujevo is a city in northeast Kosovo. Located in the geographical region of Llap, it is the largest municipality of Kosovo. It is situated to the north of Priština, east of Kosovska Mitrovica, and near the border of Serbia. In 1996, the municipality was the site of two ambushes conducted by the Kosovo Liberation Army against Yugoslav authorities, occurring on 16 June and 25 October. Since the beginning of the Kosovo War in 1998, the region of Podujevo remained largely unaffected until early-mid September, as reports emerged of KLA activity in the region. After a series of offensives launched by the Federal Republic of Yugoslavia, United Nations Security Council Resolution 1199 was adopted, calling for a ceasefire and the cessation of hostilities. The ceasefire collapsed by December, as hostilities resumed between the Yugoslav forces and the KLA. Tensions escalated on 21 December, after a policeman was shot and killed in the city by unknown gunmen. The Yugoslav Army responded by patrolling around the area with a convoy.

== Battle ==
The battle occurred between 23–27 December 1998. Yugoslav forces had the goal of destroying the ZOLL (Operative Zone of Llap) headquarters of the KLA. Before reaching the village of the ZOLL headquarters, the Yugoslav forces were met with strong resistance of the KLA at Tabe. On 25 December, KLA fighters ambushed a police car in the village of Zakut in the Podujevo municipality and in the city centre, explosives were hurled at the homes of local policemen. Fighting in Podujevo continued until 27 December, when Yugoslav Army (VJ) forces secured the town following the withdrawal of the Kosovo Liberation Army (KLA). On the same day, Yugoslav police attempted to capture Llapashtica, but were ambushed by KLA fighters en route. The KLA reportedly used 120-millimeter mortars, destroying two armoured personnel carriers (APCs) and wounding three officers. Although Yugoslav police repelled the ambush, the KLA held their positions in the village. Diplomats indicated that the KLA in Llapashtica was also open to negotiations. According to international monitors who contributed to Operation Eagle Eye, this battle shattered a ceasefire called on by foreign forces. At the conclusion of the fighting, the Kosovo Diplomatic Observer Mission monitored a convoy of Yugoslav Army vehicles.

== Sources ==
- Judah, Tim (2002). Kosovo: War and Revenge. New Haven, Connecticut: Yale University Press. ISBN 978-0-300-09725-2.
- LeBor, Adam (2002). Milosevic: A Biography. New York: Yale University Press. ISBN 978-0-300-10317-5.
