= Račak massacre =

Killing of Kosovo Albanians

- Location of Račak
- Location: 42°25′46″N 21°00′59″E; Račak, Kosovo, FR Yugoslavia
- Date: 15 January 1999 (Central European Time)
- Target: Kosovo Albanians
- Attack type: Massacre
- Deaths: 45
- Perpetrators: Serbian Special Anti-Terrorism and Special Operations units

The Račak massacre (Albanian: Masakra e Reçakut) or Račak operation (Serbian: Акција Рачак/Akcija Račak) was the massacre of 45 Kosovo Albanian civilians that took place in the village of Račak (Albanian: Reçak) in central Kosovo in January 1999. The massacre was perpetrated by Serbian security forces in response to Albanian separatist activity in the region. The Serbian government refused to let a war crimes prosecutor visit the site, and maintained that the casualties were all members of the rebel Kosovo Liberation Army (KLA) killed in combat with state security forces. This was untrue, although there were nine KLA militants killed in the village along with the 45 civilians.

The killings were investigated by two separate forensic teams, the first a joint Yugoslav–Belarusian team and the second an external Finnish team representing the EU. The first team's report, which was commissioned by the Yugoslav government, concluded that those killed, who included a woman and 12-year-old child, were all separatist guerrillas and not civilians. The findings of the second team sharply contradicted the Yugoslav investigation's report, determining that the deaths constituted killings of unarmed civilians. The lead Finnish investigator, anthropology expert Dr. Helena Ranta, called it a "crime against humanity", though refusing as a scientist to directly label it a massacre or assign blame to any specific party. Details of the Finnish team's findings were left undisclosed for two years. At the time, reporting of the incident varied from publication to publication and country to country. Media outlets covering it more definitively described the event at Račak as a gruesome terrorist atrocity by a repressive Serbian government.

Bill Clinton, then president of the United States, condemned the massacre as a deliberate and indiscriminate act of murder, and the administration sought to convince the American people that intervention in Yugoslavia was necessary. Public support for intervention among Americans remained at only about 50%, even after the extensive media attention on Račak, suggesting that war with Yugoslavia would be less popular than previous conflicts and interventions the US had undertaken in its recent history.

Regardless, the actions taken and bloodshed at Račak represented a "turning point in the war", drawing sympathy among the Western public, and ultimately played a role in NATO's decision to mount an organized military operation against the Federal Republic of Yugoslavia. NATO's involvement in the Kosovo conflict in the months following the Račak incident altogether lasted 78 days and consisted of a series of tactical airstrikes.

There is a memorial to the victims of the massacre in the village, where an annual ceremony to honour them is held.

== Background ==
Račak is a small Albanian-inhabited village in the Štimlje municipality of southern Kosovo. By 1998 it had become the scene of activity by the Albanian separatist organization the Kosovo Liberation Army (KLA). It had a population of around 2,000 people prior to the displacement of most of its inhabitants during Yugoslav military activity in the summer of 1998. By January 1999, around 350 people were reported by the Organization for Security and Co-operation in Europe (OSCE) to be living in the village. The KLA was highly active in the region and almost certainly had a presence in Račak itself, with a base near a local power plant.

On 8 January 1999, the KLA mounted an ambush on Serbian police units near the city of Suva Reka, resulting in the deaths of three Serbian policemen. The ambush was followed by a further attack on Serbian police units near the city of Uroševac two days later on 10 January, killing one policeman. The village of Račak had served as a staging area for these ambushes and in response, Yugoslav security forces established a security cordon in the area of Račak and the neighboring communities of Dulje and Caraljevo. At 06:30 on 15 January, the assault on the village of Račak began when Serbian police and KLA units began to exchange fire. Some residents of Račak were able to escape to the nearby village of Petrovo, while KLA units fought their way out to positions outside the village. KLA resistance lasted a number of hours with Serbian police units finally securing the village in the morning, later departing the village at 16:30.

== Reports ==
On 15 January, reports were received by the Kosovo Verification Mission (KVM), an unarmed observer force from the OSCE, of civilians being killed in Račak. KVM monitors attempted to gain access to the area but were refused permission by security forces despite strong protests. Instead, they watched the fighting from a nearby hill. They later gained access to the village, where they found one dead man and a number of injured people and received reports of other deaths and of people being taken away by the Serbian security forces. They were denied permission to interview the villagers or explore the area around the village.

The monitors finally gained access to the surrounding area on 16 January. Accompanied by a number of foreign journalists and members of the European Union's Kosovo Diplomatic Observer Mission (KDOM), they found a total of 40 bodies in and around the village. Another five bodies had allegedly been removed by family members. In all, 45 were reported killed, including a 12-year-old boy and three women. All had been shot and the KVM team reported that it found several bodies decapitated. KVM head William Walker later described what he had seen:

"In a gully above the village, I saw the first body. It was covered with a blanket, and when it was pulled back, I saw there was no head on the corpse — just an incredibly bloody mess on the neck. Someone told me that the skull was on the other side of the gully and asked if I wanted to see that. But I said, "No, I've pretty much got this story." [Three more bodies were found.] They looked like older men, with gray hair or white hair ... They had wounds on their heads, and there was blood on their clothes. [Then a larger group of bodies.] I didn't count them. I just looked and saw a lot of holes in the head - in the top of the head and the back of the head. A couple had what appeared to be bullet wounds knocking out their eyes. I was told there were other bodies further up and over the crest of the hill, and I was asked by journalists and inspectors if I was going to go up and see the rest. I said, 'I've seen enough.'"

Walker immediately condemned what he labelled "an unspeakable atrocity" which was "a crime very much against humanity". He told the party of journalists accompanying him: "I do not hesitate to accuse the (Serb) government security forces. We want to know who gave the orders, and who carried them out. I will insist that justice will be done. They certainly didn't deserve to die in circumstances like this."

The journalists also provided first-hand accounts of the discovery of the bodies. One of them, the BBC's reporter Jacky Rowland, reported that the dead "were all ordinary men; farmers, labourers, villagers. They had all been shot in the head." The dead were aged from 14 to 99 years old. ITN's correspondent Bill Neely was also present and described how other KVM monitors reacted at the scene: "A Swedish monitor notes that the dead are all in civilian clothes and unarmed and that there are no signs of a battle... After working for two hours one monitor, a London police officer, tells me he believes many of the victims have been shot at close range."

Two days later, on 18 January, the Chief Prosecutor of the International Criminal Tribunal for the Former Yugoslavia (ICTY), Louise Arbour, attempted to enter Kosovo to investigate the killings but was refused access by Serbian authorities. On the same day, heavily armed Serbian police entered Račak under fire from the KLA, and removed the bodies, taking them to a morgue in Pristina to await a forensic examination.

A joint Yugoslavian-Belarusian team of pathologists conducted post-mortems at the end of January. A Finnish forensic team working for the European Union subsequently conducted a second post-mortem, which was more detailed than the first, but conducted after a greater time from the actual killings. The bodies were finally released to the families and buried on 10 February 1999.

== Investigations ==
The killings at Račak became the focus of an investigation by the International Criminal Tribunal for the Former Yugoslavia. In its indictment of Slobodan Milošević and four other senior Yugoslav and Serbian officials, the ICTY's Chief Prosecutor stated that:

On or about 15 January 1999, in the early morning hours, the village of Račak was attacked by forces of the FRY [Yugoslavia] and Serbia. After shelling by VJ [Yugoslav Army] units, the Serbian police entered the village later in the morning and began conducting house-to-house searches. Villagers, who attempted to flee from the Serbian police, were shot throughout the village. A group of approximately 25 men attempted to hide in a building, but were discovered by the Serbian police. They were beaten and then were removed to a nearby hill, where the policemen shot and killed them. Altogether, the forces of the FRY and Serbia killed approximately 45 Kosovo Albanians in and around Racak.

Eyewitness reports from the surviving villagers unanimously supported the account of a massacre. The British journalist Julius Strauss, writing for The Daily Telegraph, described how he had "spent more than a week collecting evidence on the Račak massacre from Albanian witnesses, Western monitors and diplomats and a few Serbian sources who spoke privately and at some risk." According to the survivors that he interviewed, "a small group of men dressed all in black and wearing gloves and balaclavas ... co-ordinated the attack on the village and the subsequent executions." Men had been separated from women and children before being led away to be executed. One survivor told him that "some of the Serbs were in blue, some in black. The men in black appeared to be in control and wore balaclavas over their heads. Some had uniforms with insignia which included a Serbian flag; some had none. They carried automatic guns and, as we were led up the hill, both units started shooting us." Strauss speculated that the men had been from the Specijalna Antiteroristička Jedinica, the Serbian Interior Ministry's elite anti-terrorist unit. Some eyewitnesses told reporters that "Serb troops shot and mutilated their victims, and the six-hour orgy of violence ended with a nationalist song."

The Serbian government rejected this version of events. On the day after the killings, the Serbian Interior Ministry issued a statement asserting that its police units had come under fire from "ethnic Albanian terrorist groups ... on routes leading to Račak village in the Stimlje municipality." In the subsequent counter-attack "several dozen terrorists were killed in the clashes with the police. Most of them were in uniforms bearing the insignia of the ethnic Albanian terrorist organization calling itself the Kosovo Liberation Army (KLA).

They received some support from the French newspapers Le Figaro and Le Monde, which suggested that the KLA could have fabricated evidence. A film crew working for the Associated Press accompanied the Serbian forces in Račak for part of 15 January. Two French journalists from the Agence France Press and Le Figaro interviewed the cameramen and saw at least some of the footage, from which they concluded that it was possible that the KLA could have staged the massacre, and that "only a credible international inquiry would make it possible to resolve those doubts." According to the paper,

"It was in fact an empty village that the police entered in the morning, sticking close to the walls. The shooting was intense, as they were fired on from KLA trenches dug into the hillside. The fighting intensified sharply on the hilltops above the village. Watching from below, next to the mosque, the AP journalists understood that the KLA guerrillas, encircled, were trying desperately to break out. A score of them in fact succeeded, as the police themselves admitted."

Another French journalist writing for Le Monde, Christophe Chatelot, gave an account from the perspective of the two AP journalists:

"When at 10 a.m. they entered the village in the wake of a police armored vehicle, the village was nearly deserted. They advanced through the streets under the fire of the Kosovo Liberation Army (UCK) fighters lying in ambush in the woods above the village. The exchange of fire continued throughout the operation, with more or less intensity. The main fighting took place in the woods. The Albanians who had fled the village when the first Serb shells were fired at dawn tried to escape. There they ran into Serbian police who had surrounded the village. The UCK was trapped in between. The object of the violent police attack on Friday was a stronghold of UCK Albanian independence fighters. Virtually all the inhabitants had fled Račak during the frightful Serb offensive of the summer of 1998. With few exceptions, they had not come back. 'Smoke came from only two chimneys,' noted one of the two AP TV reporters."

The Serbian President, Milan Milutinović, accused the KVM head William Walker of fabricating the killings "by securing the co-operation of his protegés in the Kosovo Liberation Army". The Serbian media took a similar line, arguing that the Albanians had removed the KLA uniforms from the bodies and replaced them with civilian clothes. Unnamed French diplomats also criticised Walker for publicly blaming the Serbs for the killings, arguing that he should have waited for a more thorough investigation. The Yugoslav government declared Walker to be persona non grata and demanded that he leave the territory of Yugoslavia within 48 hours.

At the end of January 1999, the United States was reported to have leaked telephone intercepts that were said to prove the role of the Serb government in the killings. According to The Washington Post, the intercepts showed that the Serb government had ordered security forces to "go in hard" to the Račak area. Deputy Prime Minister Nikola Šainović and Interior Ministry General Sreten Lukić reportedly expressed concern about reaction to the Račak assault and discussed how to make the killings at Račak appear to be the result of combat between government troops and KLA rebels. On the day of the attack on Račak, Sainović was aware that the assault was underway and asked how many people had been killed. Lukić replied that as of that moment the tally stood at 22. Following the international uproar about the killings, Sainović told Lukić to re-enter Račak and retrieve the bodies. He also told Lukić that the ICTY prosecutor Louise Arbour was not to be allowed into the country.

=== Forensic reports ===
Three forensic examinations were carried out on the bodies, by separate teams from FR Yugoslavia, Belarus (at the time an ally of Serbia) and Finland (under the auspices of the European Union). All three examinations took place in controversial circumstances; the Yugoslav and Belarusian forensic teams carried out their autopsies against the opposition of the KVM and ICTY, which had demanded that the outside experts from Finland should be the first to carry out post-mortems on the dead. The Yugoslav and Belarusian autopsies were conducted on 19 January under the auspices of the Pristina Forensic Medical Institute. Its director, Professor Saša Dobričanin, stated that "Not a single body bears any sign of execution. The bodies were not massacred." He told the media that he suspected that the bodies had been mutilated posthumously to fabricate the appearance of an execution.

The Finnish (EU) team, headed by pathologist Helena Ranta, began its own autopsy on 21 January and released its initial findings on 17 March. The introduction to the report stressed that it was Ranta's personal view, and not the position of the team. The report concluded that "there was no evidence that the victims had been anything other than unarmed civilians and that they had probably been killed where they were later found by the international monitors." Addressing the claims that the dead had been killed wearing KLA uniforms which had then been replaced with civilian clothes, the report states that "...the clothing [of the dead] bore no badges or insignia of any military unit. No indication of removal of badges of rank or insignia was evident. Based on autopsy findings (e.g. bullet holes, coagulated blood) and photographs of the scenes, it is highly unlikely that clothes could have been changed or removed." Ranta testified at the subsequent ICTY trial of Slobodan Milošević, stating that retrieved bullets, bullet casings and entry and exit wounds indicated that the victims were killed where their bodies were found and at approximately the same time. A later Finnish report indicated that only one victim had provably been shot at close range. The report from the Finnish team, however, was kept confidential by the EU until long after the war.

Criticism was levelled by Ranta against the paraffin method used by the Yugoslavs and Belarusians to test for powder residue on the victims' hands, since it regularly gives false positives for many other substances, including fertilizers, tobacco, urine and cosmetics, and sometimes provides false negatives. The test is still used by the police of many countries who cannot afford more modern methods, but has been described since as early as 1967 as 'of no use scientifically.'

The international reaction to the Yugoslav and Belarusian report on one hand, (which supported the view that those killed were KLA fighters, not civilians as claimed by the Kosovo-Albanians and NATO) and that of the EU expert team on the other (which did not find any evidence to suggest that the dead were combatants) differed considerably, not least in the NATO-countries who were preparing to intervene to stop widespread human rights violations in Kosovo. The former was ignored or dismissed as propaganda, and the latter was accepted as evidence of a massacre against civilians. Several pro-war activists and writers wrote about, and quoted, the Finnish team's press-release. Both reports were used as evidence by the prosecution and also by the defence of Slobodan Milošević at his trial, until the Račak case was dropped from the indictment because of lack of evidence.

The full report of the EU team was handed over to the ICTY at the end of June 2000. An executive summary was published in 2001, but the full report has never been released.

In October 2008 Helena Ranta stated that she had been asked to modify the contents of her report, both by the Finnish Ministry of Foreign Affairs, and by William Walker, the head of the Organization for Security and Co-operation in Europe (OSCE) Kosovo Verification Mission, in order to make it more explicit. She refused to do so, saying it was "a task for the war crimes tribunal”. According to Ranta, in the winter of 1999 William Walker, the head of the OSCE Kosovo monitoring mission, broke a pencil in two and threw the pieces at her when she was not willing to use sufficiently strong language about the Serbs.

== Consequences ==
Many western governments, human rights groups and international organisations insisted that the Račak operation was a deliberate massacre, conducted in defiance of earlier Serbian agreements to end the violence in Kosovo. The OSCE, Council of Europe, EU, NATO and the UN Security Council all issued strongly worded statements condemning the killings. On January 22, the Contact Group of countries with an interest in Yugoslavia (Britain, France, Germany, Italy, Russia and the United States) issued a joint statement condemning "the massacre of Kosovo Albanians in Račak on 15 January. All members expressed their revulsion at this act of mass murder. No amount of provocation could justify it. The Contact Group condemns UCK [KLA] provocations which can only contribute to rising tensions and further violence... The Contact Group also condemns the decisions by the FRY authorities to refuse entry into Kosovo by ICTY Chief Prosecutor Judge Arbour." The Contact Group also called for Yugoslav authorities to "work with the International Tribunal to ensure that those responsible for Račak are brought to justice [and] suspend those VJ and MUP officers operating in Račak on 15 January pending the results of this investigation becoming available".

According to Edward S. Herman, media collaboration assisted the Račak massacre in serving as a casus belli for the NATO bombing of Yugoslavia. Ranta's news conference on 17 March 1999 during the final days of the Rambouillet Agreement talks, coupled with media outlets failing to mention the circumstances of the Serbian offensive in the area, helped to justify NATO involvement in Kosovo.

The UN Security Council and Secretary General on 19 January described the event as a massacre perpetrated by Yugoslav security forces.

=== ICTY indictment ===
The ICTY issued a sealed indictment on 27 May 1999 for crimes against humanity and violations of the laws and customs of war against a number of senior Yugoslav officials. These were Slobodan Milošević (President of Yugoslavia), Milan Milutinović (President of Serbia), Nikola Šainović (Yugoslav Deputy Prime Minister), Dragoljub Ojdanić (Chief of the General Staff of the Yugoslav Army) and Vlajko Stojiljković (Serbian Interior Minister). The Račak massacre was added by the ICTY prosecutors in an amended indictment, but was subsequently dropped from the case, to "improve the expeditiousness of the proceedings while ensuring that they remain fair".

== Aftermath ==
On June 18, 2001, a court in Pristina sentenced Zoran Stojanović, a 32-year-old police officer, to 15 years' imprisonment for murder and attempted murder in Račak. Stojanović, a Kosovo Serb, was convicted by a joint UN-Kosovo Albanian panel of judges (two United Nations magistrates and one ethnic Albanian). Stojanović's trial was highly controversial. It was speedy, one of the first trials by a hastily organized new court. Stojanović was alleged to have killed one man and wounded two more by firing one bullet. During the trial, according to one UN legal officer, both the international judges and the Albanian judge had considered dismissing the case, but did not do so, allegedly for political reasons. During the trial, some witnesses allegedly presented testimonies that contradicted the forensic evidence.

The reconstruction of events in Račak for the trial was prevented by two men, who chased off court officials, telling them, "we don't want any Serbs in our village." The second reconstruction was prevented by an angry mob of Albanians. A subsequent reconstruction was held without the presence of either the defendant or his lawyer. The prosecutor, Tome Gashe, told the court during the trial that unless Stojanović were found guilty, the people would "take justice in their own hands". The trial and sentencing of Stojanović was criticised by the United Nations and Amnesty International.

Zoran Stojanović was pardoned in 2007 and released from custody. In late 2009, President of Serbia Boris Tadić pardoned Zoran Stojanović, declaring that the trial was unjust, which opened the question as to whether he had jurisdiction because Stojanović was sentenced by an international High court.

=== Denial of the massacre ===
Kosovo Serb politician Ivan Todosijević denied the massacre took place and said that the story was made up by "Albanian terrorists". In 2019, he was convicted of incitement to ethnic, racial, or religious intolerance and was sentenced to two years in prison by a court in Pristina for making the claims. The Serbian president, Aleksandar Vučić, supported Todosijevic, claiming that the massacre was indeed made up. Kosovo Albanian politicians and civil society reacted strongly against this claim. Then president of Kosovo, Hashim Thaçi, said that peace in the Balkans would only be established when Serbia expressed shame, and not pride, when discussing war crimes. There were reactions by the former prime minister of Kosovo Ramush Haradinaj, former Kosovar minister of foreign affairs Behgjet Pacolli, and the European Commission. The European Commission stated that “Denial and revisionism are contrary to the values of the European Union and are contrary to the project of integration of the Western Balkans into the European Union. Sentencing has to be proportionate and take into account all elements of the case”.

In October 2022, Todosijević's conviction was upheld at his retrial. Kosovo's Court of Appeals upheld the verdict in March 2023, but the Supreme Court of Kosovo overturned it in July 2023, acquitting Todosijević of inciting hate.

== See also ==
- War crimes in Kosovo
- UN Mission in Kosovo

== Sources ==
- Judah, Tim (2000). Kosovo: War and Revenge. Yale University Press. ISBN 0300097255.
- Loquai, Heinz (2000). Der Kosovo-Konflikt – Wege in einen vermeidbaren Krieg: die Zeit von Ende November 1997 bis März 1999 [The Kosovo-Conflict – Ways in to an avoidable war: the time from end of November 1997 to March 1999] (in German). Baden-Baden: Nomos Verlagsgesellschaft. ISBN 3-7890-6681-8.
