= Gabriel Keller =

French diplomat (born 1947)

Gabriel Keller (born 12 August 1947) is a French diplomat and teacher.

== Biography ==
He was born in Paris, France.

Keller earned a history professor agrégé degree in 1972 at Paris West University Nanterre La Défense. He completed his military obligations at the French lycee of Puducherry in India.

He graduated from the École nationale d'administration (ENA) in 1979 and began his diplomatic career by joining the Ministry of Foreign and European Affairs (France) (MFA). His position took him to several French embassies abroad, which led him to hold various responsibilities within the United Nations and the Organization for Security and Co-operation in Europe (OSCE).

== Professional ==
Keller held various teaching posts in India and Tunisia between 1967 and 1976.

Within the MFA, Gabriel Keller served as Coordinator at the Cultural, Scientific and Technical relations from 1979 until 1982; as First Counselor at the French embassy in Kuala Lumpur, Malaysia from 1982 until 1984; and as Counselor at the French Permanent Mission to the International Organisations in Vienna, Austria from 1984 until 1986.

While at the Ministry of Foreign and European Affairs in Paris, Keller was head of the Methods, Training and Computing Department from 1986 until 1989. He was then appointed deputy Director of the Department of UN and International Organisations, as member of the National Consultative Committee for Human Rights and member of the French delegation to the United Nations General Assembly between 1989 and 1993.

He served as Head of staff to the Minister of Human Rights and Humanitarian Action during 1993 and 1994. Gabriel Keller joined the Institut des hautes études de défense nationale (IHEDN) in 1994, graduating in 1995. He was later appointed as Chargé d'Affaires and then Ambassador to Yugoslavia from 1995 to 1996.

He also served as Minister Counselor at the French embassy in the United Kingdom from 1996 until 1998, and as an Ambassador and Deputy Head of Mission of the OSCE mission in Kosovo, led by American Ambassador William Walker. During the OSCE mission in Kosovo (KVM, October 1998 – May 1999) Gabriel Keller, principal deputy to the head of mission, confronted William Walker whom he accused of being systematically in favour of the Kosovo Liberation Army (UCK) and to prepare the NATO military intervention, instead of respecting the clauses of the mission by ensuring favorable conditions to the peace negotiation. During the course of the mission, Keller also denounced the brutality of the UCK as well as the responsibilities of the UCK in the violations of the ceasefire. After the Račak massacre in January 1999, which led to the end of the OSCE mission in Kosovo, Keller contributed to the participation of the UCK delegation in the Rambouillet Agreement talks despite the Serbian obstacles and tried to keep the channels of communication with the Serbs open. In March 1999, Keller was against the withdrawal of the OSCE mission in Kosovo, knowing this would lead to the bombings of the Federal Republic of Yugoslavia. This mission ended with the first NATO bombardments over Yugoslavia during 1998 to 1999.

Keller was appointed Ambassador Chief of the European Union Observation Mission in the Former Republic of Yugoslavia in 2000. He served as an Ambassador to Yugoslavia (then Serbia and Montenegro) from 2000 until 2003, as an Ambassador for Human Rights from 2003 until 2004, and as an Ambassador for Bioethics from 2005 until 2008. He was appointed Ambassador to the Republic of Azerbaijan in July 2008.

== Personal life ==
Keller was married to Biljana Srbljanović, a Serbian playwright, from 2006 until 2014. Keller has translated two of her plays Locusts and Barbelo, of children and dogs to French.

== Decorations ==
- Officer de la Legion d'Honneur
- Chevalier de l'Ordre national du Mérite
