= Ambush near Suva Reka =

1999 military action

- Part of the Kosovo War
Date	8 January 1999
Location	Suva Reka, FR Yugoslavia
Result	KLA victory: Start of the Suva Reka massacre.

Belligerents
Kosovo Liberation Army	Serbian police Yugoslav army

Commanders and leaders
Unknown	Uroš Nikolić

Units involved
125th Brigade	549th motorized brigade of Prizren

Casualties and losses
3 wounded	3 killed 4 wounded
- 2 civilians seriously wounded

The Ambush near Suva Reka (Serbian: Zaseda kod Suve Reke) was an incident that occurred during the Kosovo War when members of the Kosovo Liberation Army (KLA) ambushed a MUP convoy, killing three Serbian policemen near the village of Dulje, close to Suva Reka. The three Serbian policemen were blown up by a rocket-propelled grenade that exploded on impact with their squad car.

== Background ==
The KLA set the ambush in retaliation for the shelling of the village of Sllapuzhan by Yugoslav troops.

== Incident ==
On 8 January 1999, the KLA's 125th brigade, which had been operating in the nearby areas of Prizren and Orahovac, led an ambush on a convoy of Yugoslav troops near the town of Suva Reka. In the incident, the KLA fired a rocket-propelled grenade at a convoy of Yugoslav troops and vehicles. Four policemen were wounded and another three were killed. Two civilians were also seriously wounded after a fierce firefight. The KLA also suffered three injuries.

== Aftermath ==
The KLA followed up the ambush with another attack on a Serbian police patrol near the village of Slivovë, killing one police officer. The village of Reçak served as the staging area for these ambushes, resulting in a significant buildup of Yugoslav Army forces and subsequent massacre on the village.
