= Kosovo Verification Mission =

Monitoring of compliance with stopping the Kosovo War

OSCE Kosovo Verification Mission

- Abbreviation: KVM
- Predecessor: OSCE Missions of Long Duration in Kosovo, Sandjak and Vojvodina; Kosovo Diplomatic Observer Mission
- Successor: OSCE Mission in Kosovo
- Formation: 25 October 1998
- Dissolved: 9 June 1999
- Headquarters: Pristina, Kosovo
- Region served: Kosovo, Yugoslavia
- Director: William G. Walker
- Deputy Director: Gabriel Keller
- Parent organization: Organization for Security and Co-operation in Europe
- Staff: 1,400 ground observers
- Website: https://www.osce.org/kvm-closed

The OSCE Kosovo Verification Mission (KVM) was an OSCE mission in Kosovo to verify that the Serbian and Yugoslav forces were complying with United Nations Security Council resolutions 1199 and 1203 and with the Clark-Naumann agreement, to end atrocities in Kosovo, withdraw armed forces from Kosovo, and abide by a ceasefire. The mission was deployed on 25 October 1998, was withdrawn on 20 March 1999 and was closed on 9 June 1999.

== Remit ==
The mission was established by OSCE Permanent Council Decision No.263 of 25 October 1998, in line with the "Agreement on the OSCE Kosovo Verification Mission" approved by the government of the Federal Republic of Yugoslavia and the OSCE on 16 October 1998.

The KVM's mandate was to:

- Monitor parties' compliance with the agreement;
- Report any breaches to the OSCE, and to help affected civilians in Kosovo;
- Report on roadblocks;
- Oversee elections;
- Ensure that independent and fair police service was set up.

== Strength ==
The KVM was to comprise a maximum of 2000 unarmed and non-uniformed verifiers.

Planned composition:

- 1000 participants with a military background (military observers)
- 500 police officers
- 500 civilians, (initially 200), mainly as human rights and election observers

Numerous mission members from all three areas were entrusted with administrative tasks (e.g. organization, finance, IT, etc.). To support the mission, large numbers of local staff were recruited (including translators, drivers, secretaries, technicians).

The mission never reached full strength, about 1400 personnel were in place before the mission was withdrawn.

== Operations ==
United States diplomat William Walker was appointed head of the mission; he was relatively senior, reflecting the importance that NATO put on a peaceful settlement. His deputy was Gabriel Keller.

Despite being much larger and more complex than any previous OSCE mission, the KVM was put together relatively quickly; parts of the team arrived in Kosovo a month after the 16 October agreement.

Immediately after the Agreement, neither side adhered to the ceasefire; state loyalist forces continued to shoot at civilians, and there were sporadic KLA attacks on state forces.

When a KVM team arrived at the scene of the Račak massacre, they found "36 bodies 23 of which were lying in a ditch". An independent Finnish forensic investigation established that the bodies had evidence of ballistic gunshot trauma from a distance and traces of gunpowder residue on their hands, suggesting that they were killed as a result of a skirmish with Yugoslav police force.

=== Operation Eagle Eye ===
Operation Eagle Eye augmented the work of the Kosovo Verification Mission during the Kosovo War using aircraft were contributed by France, Germany, Italy, Netherlands, the UK, and the USA. Beginning on 17 October 1998. The aim was to monitor the federal Yugoslav government's compliance with United Nations Security Council Resolution 1199, and in particular the withdrawal of armed forces from Kosovo and compliance with the ceasefire. As a result of Yugoslav troop activities and other forms of non-compliance, ground observers withdrew citing "an unacceptable level of risk to the peace support verification mission" resulting in an end to aerial verification on 24 March 1999.

== Withdrawal ==
In March 1999, together with the Rambouillet Agreement which the Serbian government refused to sign (just as NATO refused the terms for a diplomatic settlement proposed by Serbia), there was an increase in ceasefire violations by both sides as well as NATO threats of airstrikes against Serbia; as the risks increased, it was decided, against the objections of Serbia, to withdraw the KVM to Ohrid in Macedonia on 20 March 1999. Yugoslav forces' reaction to the withdrawal was "remarkably docile" and the KVM was downsized to 250 staff.

Then, after the KVM had left, according to the U.S. State Department, state forces “launched a significant operation against KLA [Kosovo Liberation Army] forces,” and on March 23 “targeted” Pristina, Pec, and other cities “for ethnic cleansing”.

Allegedly as a result, on 24 March NATO started its bombing campaign in what remained of Yugoslavia.

After the start of the bombing, the Serb campaign of ethnic cleansing and other atrocities went into full effect. Refugees fled to Albania, Macedonia, and Montenegro; many refugees had their documents destroyed.

In April 1999, the OSCE decided that the KVM should help deal with the refugee chaos; 70 verifiers were sent to Tirana, where they helped coordinate disaster-response and interviewed refugees.

The mission was formally closed on 9 June 1999, leaving behind a residual OSCE Transitional Task Force for Kosovo to prepare for a longer term OSCE Mission in Kosovo which was established on 1 July 1999 after Kosovo came under United Nations administration.

== See also ==
- OSCE Mission in Kosovo
- Kosovo Diplomatic Observer Mission
