= Biljana Srbljanović =

Serbian playwright and university professor (born 1970)

- Биљана Србљановић
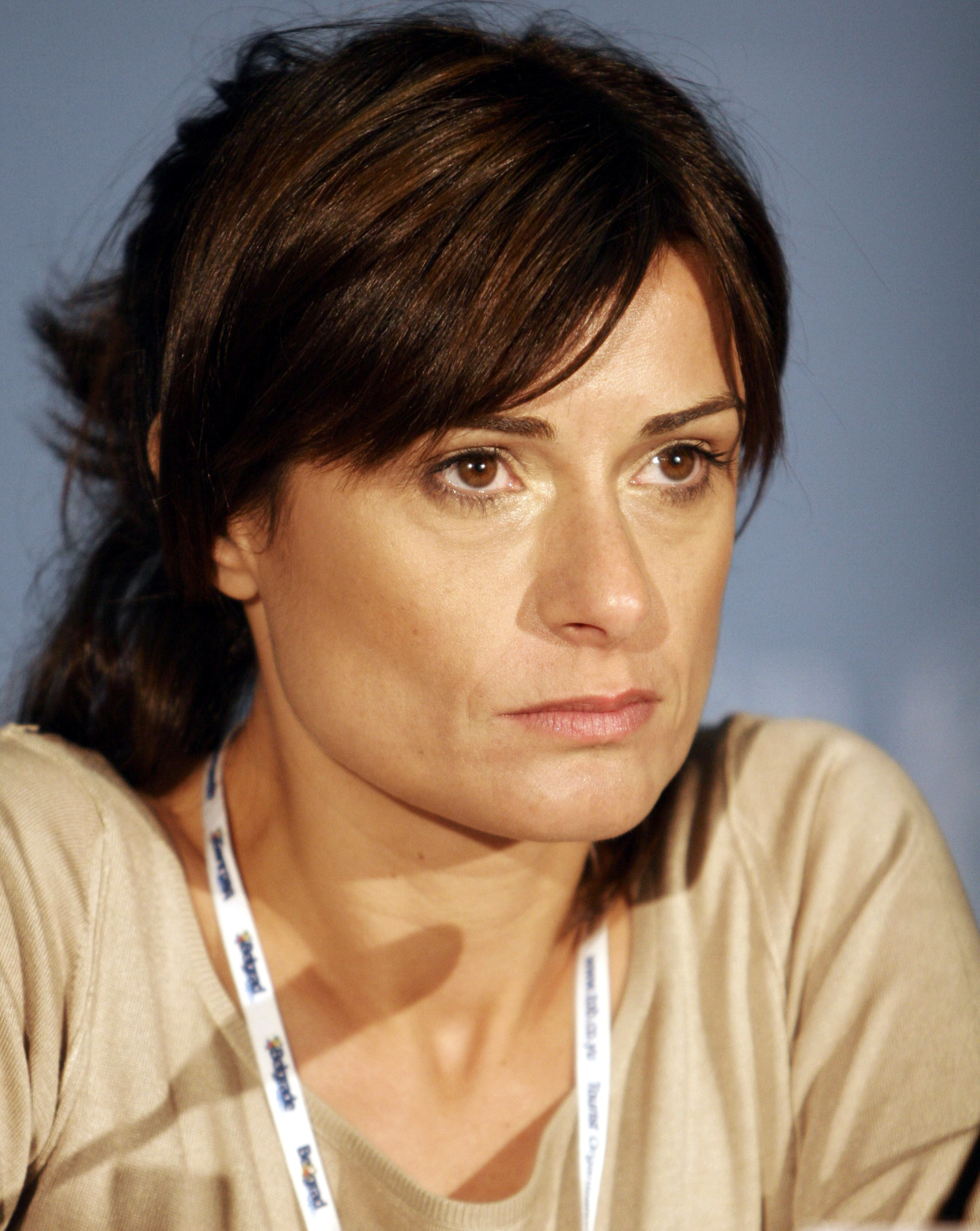
- Srbljanović in June 2008
- Born: 15 October 1970 (age 55); Stockholm, Sweden
- Education: Faculty of Dramatic Arts
- Alma mater: University of Arts in Belgrade
- Occupations: Playwright; politician; NGO administrator
- Spouse: Gabriel Keller (m. 2006; div. 2014)

Biljana Srbljanović (Serbian Cyrillic: Биљана Србљановић, pronounced [bǐʎana sr̩bʎǎːnoʋitɕ]; born 15 October 1970) is a Serbian playwright and university professor.

She has written eleven theater plays and screenplay for Otvorena vrata television series that aired on Radio Television of Serbia during the mid-1990s. Her plays have been staged in some 50 countries. Srbljanović is also a part-time lecturer at the University of Arts' Faculty of Dramatic Arts (FDU) in Belgrade. On 1 December 1999, she became the first non-German writer to receive the Ernst Toller Prize. She is the recipient of various theatre awards in Serbia, including the Dragiša Kašiković Award, Slobodan Selenić Award, City of Belgrade Award, Joakim Vujić Statuette, and Sterija Award. Furthermore, she received the 2003 Osvajanje slobode Award, an annual accolade given out by the Serbian Civic Alliance (GSS) political party to women for "contributions in promotion of human rights, democracy, and tolerance in political communication".

In 2007, she was awarded the IX Europe Prize Theatrical Realities, in Thessaloniki.

== Early life ==
Srbljanović was born on 15 October 1970 in Stockholm whereto her father Danilo Srbljanović had arrived a few years earlier during the late 1960s as a gastarbeiter from SFR Yugoslavia in search of better employment opportunities. He would soon be joined by his girlfriend Miroslava Simić who came over from Yugoslavia. The couple wed in the Yugoslav embassy in Stockholm—a civil ceremony presided over by ambassador Vladimir Rolović—and had their daughter Biljana. In April 1971, months after her parents' wedding, the embassy was attacked by a group of Croatian Ustashe-affiliated terrorists led by Miro Barešić who assassinated ambassador Rolović.

== Writing career ==
Srbljanović obtained her dramaturgy degree in 1995 at the Faculty of Dramatic Arts in Belgrade. The first play she wrote, Beogradska trilogija (The Belgrade Trilogy), was premiered in 1997 in Belgrade, Serbia at the Yugoslav Drama Theater. After its huge success, the play was staged in many other countries, including Armenia, Italy, Germany, Austria, Switzerland, Belgium, England, and the Scandinavian countries.

In April 1998 her second play, Porodične priče (Family Stories), was written in Belgrade and staged at Atelje 212. It won the Best New Play Award at the theatre festival in Novi Sad, Serbia and was later staged in Germany, Poland, Romania, Slovenia, the United States, Switzerland, the Netherlands, France and elsewhere.

In December 1999, Srbljanović completed The Fall, which premiered in July 2000 at the City Theater Festival in Budva, Montenegro. Due to lack of public interest, the play was quickly erased from the program of Belgrade's theaters.

The young artist can also be seen in the Serbian movie Land of Truth, Love and Freedom (Zemlja istine ljubavi i slobode) as an actress in a leading role.

The premiere of Supermarket, her fourth play, took place in May 2001 at the Festival of Vienna, Austria. It is still staged in many European countries.

In late 2003, Srbljanović completed her fifth play, America, Part Two. This became Serbia's most popular play in 2003 and 2004.

Srbljanović's next play, Skakavci (Locusts), won the New Theatrical Realities Award, one of Europe's most prominent theatre awards. In the 2005–06 season, German theater magazine Theater Heute proclaimed Srbljanović the best foreign playwright of the season.

Her latest play This Grave Is Too Small For Me has attracted international press attention as well as acclaim from various audiences in Europe.

== Europe Theatre Prize ==
In 2007, she received the IX Europe Prize Theatrical Realities, in Thessaloniki, with the following motivation:

For her and for the people of her country which has suffered so much, it is undoubtedly the epithet “European prize” that imports more as a confirmation of the fact that the Serbs are present and will be always present on this continent. Living in Serbia and in Europe at the same time, Biljana Srbljanović is not kind at all towards her compatriots: in the “Belgrad Trilogy”, she revealed their dissimulated, two-faced morality; then, with anger, she draws a caricature of them in the “Family Stories”. This author belongs to the current of the new European drama - courageous, open, brutal and it is not only in her own place that she’s offensive: in “The Supermarket”, she left for the superficial Occident, than she had the courage to attack and criticise “L’Amerika”- it is in this part, that came to maturity her ability to realise character’s deep, psychological characterization. “The Fall” analyzes people living in countries with totalitarian regimes, and in “The Locusts”, she goes back in her own country in the aim to draw a historical picture of four generations which worked out the corroded country’s actual face. Biljana Srbljanović is not the only one politically committed playwright who criticizes with ferocity her own country’s regime and the people supporting this regime: last year, Harold Pinter’s name has proved us that she‘s not alone in her case. At all monochromic, Biljana Srbljanović’s Balkans, have an outstanding environment; - rough, frank, quarrelsome and mystical. More than any of her predecessors, this playwright brought Balkans closer to the Europe and made us think about how much Balkan spirit is present in our souls as well. Her voice strongly echoed over the whole continent.

== Political career ==
=== Liberal Democratic Party (LDP) ===
In April 2007, Srbljanović officially joined the Liberal Democratic Party (LDP), with an additional role as a member of the party's newly established political council. Alongside Srbljanović, other individuals appointed to the LDP political council were: Vesna Pešić (council president), Biljana Kovačević-Vučo, Bojan Đurić, Branko Dimitrijević, Dejan Sinadinović, Filip David, Ivan Andrić, Ivan Torov, Jadranka Jelinčić, Jasna Šakota, Latinka Perović, Miroslav Prokopijević, Miša Šahović, Nenad Prokić, Nikola Samardžić, Olivera Ježina, Petar Luković, Rajko Danilović, Saška Stanojlović, Sonja Biserko, Srbijanka Turajlić, Veljko Đurović, Vera Marković, Vladimir Gligorov, Vladimir Todorić, Zoran Ostojić, and Zoran Purešević.

In late March 2008, Srbljanović was announced as LDP's candidate for mayor of Belgrade at the upcoming May 2008 local elections.

Six months after the party's poor electoral showing in various Belgrade municipalities, she publicly complained on her personal blog of being marginalized by the LDP, specifically that "everyone within the party, except for Vesna Pešić and Žarko Korać, distanced themselves [from Srbljanović]" and that she has since learned that "everyone [in the party] has a price, whether it's commercial real estate in municipalities where LDP is part of the ruling coalition or salaried positions at the state-owned enterprises or an opportunity for future [financial and political] deals". Though quickly deleted, the blog post caused a lot of reaction from her party colleagues. Days later, reportedly following a talk with the party president Čedomir Jovanović who had in the meantime publicly expressed his support for the playwright's future in the party, Srbljanović came out with a statement that interpersonal relations within the party are good while relaying a personal opinion that LDP is "the best political party in Serbia".

She has quietly left the party at some point over the years since.

== Other activities ==
=== Ana Brnabić's Council for Creative Industries ===
In March 2018, Srbljanović's appointment to the newly established Government of Serbia Council for Creative Industries was announced. Formed and launched by Serbia's Prime Minister Ana Brnabić, the council is envisioned as a "gathering of individuals and organizations possessing a wealth of experience in creative industries who will help the Prime Minister fully understand the needs of that sector and make informed decisions for its future development". In addition to Srbljanović, other council members include marketing expert Lazar Džamić, Tijana Palkovljević Bugarski, Vuk Veličković, art historian Aleksandra Lazar, Youth Initiative for Human Rights NGO founder Andrej Nosov, Igor Todorović, Milan Marković, Jasna Dimitrijević, visual artist Slavimir Stojanović as well as representatives of Exit Foundation, Mokrin House, Serbia Film Commission, Startit, and Nova iskra.

Immediately after the announcement of her appointment to the governmental agency, Srbljanović faced criticism of selling out to the government from various individuals including political activist Aida Ćorović.

Six month after the council was formed, in an October 2018 Nedeljnik interview, Serbia PM Brnabić praised Srbljanović as "an intellectual she especially admires, someone who criticizes the government but is also willing to help" while adding that Serbia would be a better place if it had more brave people like her".

=== Heartefact fund ===
Srbljanović is the program director of the Heartefact fund, a Belgrade-based non-governmental organization active since 2009 in the Western Balkans politically defined region, that among its mission lists "rethinking of contemporary artistic, social and political issues and phenomena at national [Serbia], regional [Western Balkans] and European levels" and "advocating new models of production, regional [Western Balkans] cooperation and alternative forms of education" through "developing policies that support Erinnerungskultur (culture of remembrance), democratic values, human rights, freedom of speech and public sphere accountability".

Hertefact's organizational structure also includes Andrej Nosov, Živana Janković, Mirjana Milivojević, Aleksandra Lozanović, and Vana Filipovski while its governing board consists of FDU vice-dean Ana Martinoli, PR manager and piano professor Jelena Milašinović, political scientist, advisor, and NGO administrator Ivan Vejvoda, public advocate and lobbyist Goran Miletić, and actor Branko Cvejić. The organization is financed by the National Endowment for Democracy (NED), Open Society Foundations' Serbian branch, U.S. embassy in Serbia, European Union's Creative Europe programme, Serbian government's Ministry of Culture and Information, Swiss embassy in Serbia, Kingdom of the Netherlands, Heinrich Böll Foundation, etc.

== Views and opinions ==
Srbljanović has for decades been an outspoken figure in the Serbian public sphere.

In the late 1980s and early 1990s, during her university days, Srbljanović was a close friend of Isidora Bjelica and wrote for the right-wing Pogledi magazine.

By mid-1990s, Srbljanović's political views swung to the left as she began fiercely opposing the policies of Slobodan Milošević as well as views held by individuals and parties in the Serbian political opposition on the right side of the political spectrum. In 1997, as one of the guests on Olja Bećković's Utisak nedelje talk programme on Studio B, Srbljanović squared off against her former Pogledi editor-in-chief Miloslav Samardžić over the issue of American magnate George Soros injecting funds into the pro-Western Serbian media outlets, primarily B92.

Even after the 5 October 2000 Overthrow in Serbia, she continued railing against what she viewed to be "the irresponsibility of the political elite in Serbia", "Serbian violent nationalism" and "the culture of violence and exclusion in Serbian daily life". From May 2006 until February 2009, she maintained her own blog on the B92.net site where among other things she frequently criticized various individuals, mostly Serbian politicians and other public figures who displayed political opinions she opposes such as Nebojša Krstić, adviser to the Serbian president Boris Tadić.

In 2010 Srbljanović opened a Twitter account where she continued commenting on Serbian politics. During late summer 2011, she got into several heated exchanges with the Democratic Party (DS) spokeswoman Jelena Trivan.

The artist is signatory of the Declaration on the Common Language of the Croats, Serbs, Bosniaks and Montenegrins within the project Languages and Nationalisms (Jezici i nacionalzmi). The declaration is against political separation of four Serbo-Croatian standard variants that leads to a series of negative social, cultural and political phenomena in which linguistic expression is enforced as a criterion of ethno-national affiliation and as a means of political loyalty in successor states of Yugoslavia.

== Controversy ==
=== Libel suit ===
In March 2001, Srbljanović was sued for libel by film director Emir Kusturica as a result of her Vreme magazine op-ed in which she passingly refers to the director as "Milošević's immoral profiteer", accusing him of "direct collaboration with the [Milošević] regime through Milorad Vučelić [Kusturica's friend and Serbian state-owned TV (RTS) general-director]". Srbljanović based the accusation on her earlier claim within the same piece that Kusturica's 1995 film Underground was "mostly financed by the Milošević-controlled RTS". Six months later, in September 2001 right before the first court date, Vreme magazine organized a mediation attempt between the two parties, with Kusturica and Srbljanović meeting face to face in the magazine's offices. At the meeting, Kusturica reportedly expressed willingness to drop the lawsuit if Srbljanović issues a public apology, which Srbljanović refused. The next day, at the first court date, Srbljanović once again rejected the offer of a public apology.

In December 2003, two and a half years after the initial filing, a municipal court (opštinski sud) in Belgrade ruled in Kusturica's favour as Srbljanović's claims couldn't stand up to closer scrutiny after Kusturica's attorney Branislav Tapušković provided a complete documentation of Underground producers and financiers, proving that funding mostly came from several France-based production companies while parts of the movie were only shot on RTS sound stages in Belgrade.

=== Other ===
In July 2007 Srbljanović criticized basketball player Milan Gurović on her blog, referring to him as "that tattooed idiot", for having a tattoo of World War II Chetnik leader Draža Mihailović on his arm.

Additionally, Srbljanović aroused controversy with her 18 February 2012 tweet referring to the news item about former Serbian interior minister Dragan Jočić getting extra police security following the arrest of the organized crime figure Luka Bojović. Srbljanović's tweet — "'Jočić getting extra security detail' why? he ain't gonna run" — mocked the fact Jočić is physically disabled ever since his 2008 car accident.

Srbljanović set off a torrent of negative sentiment from the general public in Serbia after making an awkward joke on Twitter during the catastrophic May 2014 floods. The tweet in Serbian read "Excuse me for not being compassionate, but you have 10 more minutes to swim to the gallery for the promotion of the book Tomato". A flurry of tweets, Facebook posts and news updates were quick to condemn the post, and her Twitter account @leyakeller became unavailable shortly afterwards.

In January 2019, Srbljanović posted a vicious Facebook reaction to a tweet by the actor and newly appointed Movement of Free Citizens (PSG) leader Sergej Trifunović whom she had previously collaborated with professionally in addition to a temporal overlap in their early 1990s respective studies at the University of Arts' Faculty of Dramatic Arts (FDU). Prompted by Trifunović tweeting about her early 1990s right-wing views and political activism—specifically a tweet in which the actor-turned-politician recalls witnessing "the leather-overcoat-and-Doc Martens-clad first year dramaturgy student and White Eagles member Srbljanović barge into the FDU commissary by kicking the door in anger and, in a manner of a political commissar, admonish the gathered crowd for 'eating and drinking while our brothers are dying in Slavonia and Baranya'"—Srbljanović launched into an obscenity-laced, insult-laden tirade on her Facebook account, denouncing Trifunović's morality, professionalism, personal hygiene, and accusing him of "responsibility in the assassination of Zoran Đinđić". Serbian actress, film producer, and former FDU student Bojana Maljević, who has also had a prior professional history with Srbljanović, supported the veracity of the event Trifunović mentioned in his original tweet.

== Personal ==
Srbljanović is related to Radovan Karadžić, wartime political leader of Bosnian Serbs, sentenced to 40 years in prison by the international tribunal at The Hague.

In 2006, following several years of dating, Srbljanović married the French diplomat Gabriel Keller, having met him during his 2000-2003 term as French ambassador to FR Yugoslavia. The couple divorced in 2014.

=== Drug possession arrest ===
Srbljanović was detained by police on 1 December 2011 while buying cocaine in Belgrade from twenty-seven-year-old street dealer Miloš "Šone" Stanojčić and had a criminal investigation request (krivična prijava) filed against her for possession of illegal substances. According to the information she provided during police hearing, in addition to the drug purchase she was caught for, Srbljanović had also bought drugs from the same dealer four days earlier, each time paying €60.

Despite providing a detailed account of her drug purchases at the police hearing, two months later—on 7 February 2012 during a hearing before the investigative judge (istražni sudija)—Srbljanović used the right to silence as her defence.

The forty-one-year-old playwright eventually ended up avoiding being legally charged by taking a plea deal from the prosecutor's office in late March 2012—agreeing to donate RSD200,000 to charity as well as to testify against the dealer who sold her the drugs.

== Works ==
- Beogradska trilogija (1997)
- Porodične priče (1998)
- "Belgrade Trilogy" in Eastern Promise: Seven Plays from Central and Eastern Europe (1999)
- Pad (2000)
- Supermarket (2001)
- Amerika drugi deo (2003)
- Skakavci (2005)
- Barbelo, o psima i deci (2007)
- Nije smrt biciklo (da ti ga ukradu) (2011)
- Mali mi je ovaj grob (2013)
- Tuđe srce ili pozorišni traktat o granici (2016)
- Vrat od stakla (2018)
- Intimnost (2020)

== See also ==
- Culture of Serbia
