= Helena Ranta =

Finnish forensic dentist

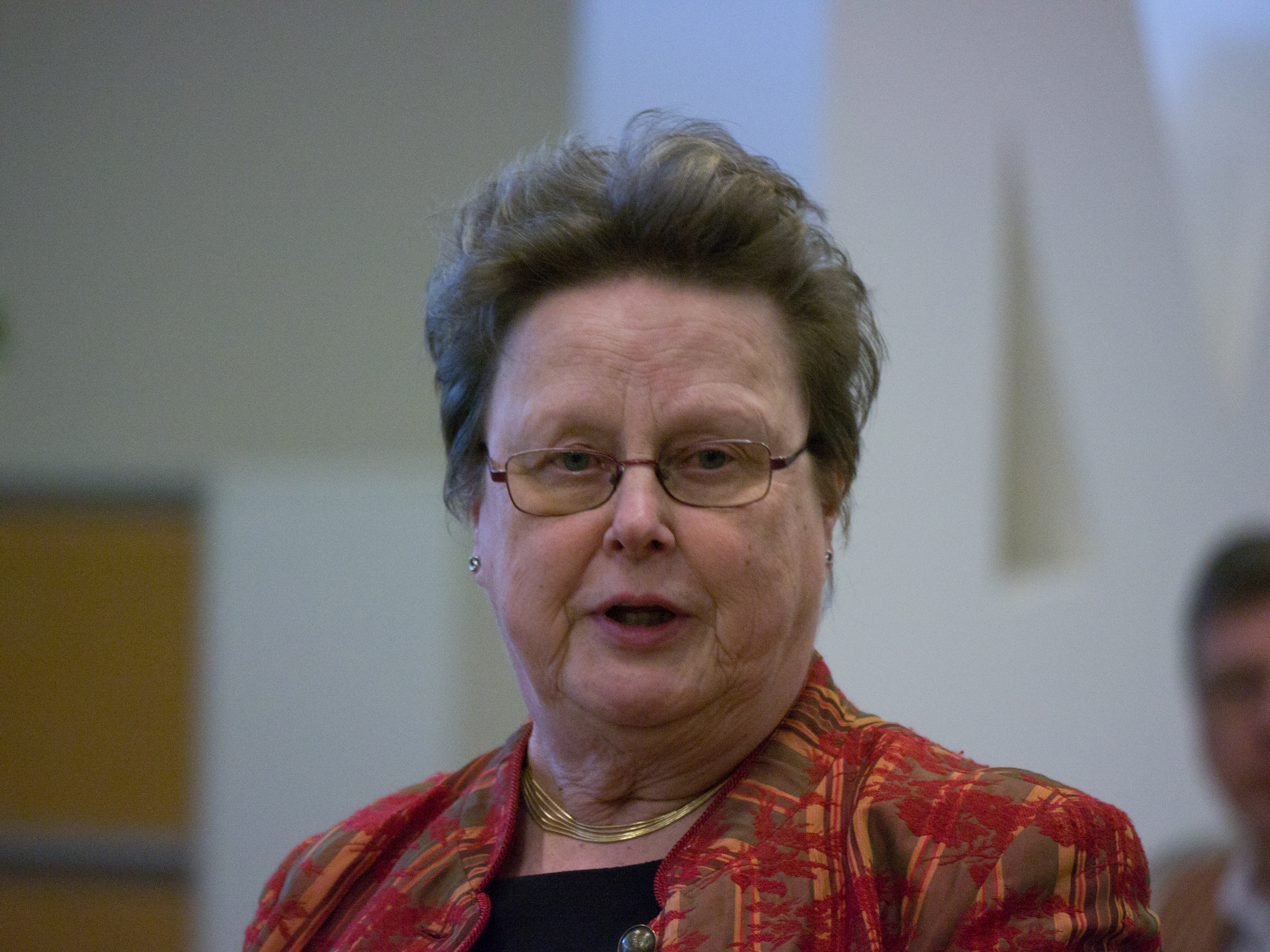
Helena Ranta

Meri Helena Ranta (born 11 June 1946) is a Finnish forensic dentist. She became well known as a result of her contributions to several international forensic investigations of conflict situations, such as those in Kosovo. She testified at the trial of former Yugoslav president Slobodan Milošević after her forensic work in the Kosovo village of Račak. She was also part of the investigation of the victims of the sinking of MS Estonia.

In October 2008 Helena Ranta stated that she had been asked to modify the contents of her forensic report for Račak case in Yugoslavia, both by the Finnish Ministry of Foreign Affairs, and by William G. Walker, the head of the Organization for Security and Co-operation in Europe (OSCE) Kosovo Verification Mission, in order to make it more explicit, she had refused to do so, saying this was "a task for the war crimes tribunal". According to Ranta, in the winter of 1999 William Walker, the head of the OSCE Kosovo monitoring mission, broke a pencil in two and threw the pieces at her when she was not willing to use sufficiently strong language about the Serbs.

Ranta was part of the team that investigated alleged Israeli massacres in the Palestinian Jenin refugee camp.

In addition to her forensic work, she is a lecturer at the University of Helsinki, a rare case of a licentiate holding a post usually reserved for those with research doctorates.

Ranta has worked in Bosnia and Herzegovina (1996–1997), Kosovo (1998–2001), Cameroon (2002), Peru (2002), Iraq (2004), Southeast Asia (2005), Chechnya, Peru and Colombia.
