= Operation Eagle Eye (1999) =

NATO air operation over Kosovo

- Part of the Kosovo Verification Mission and Kosovo War
Date	30 October 1998 – 24 March 1999
Location	Kosovo, FR Yugoslavia
Result	Operation changed to Operation Allied Force

Belligerents
(Federal Republic of Yugoslavia) FR Yugoslavia	NATO: France; Germany; Netherlands; United Kingdom; United States; Canada

Commanders and leaders
Slobodan Milošević	(NATO) / (United States) Michael E. Short

Strength
Unknown	(NATO) 1,400 Ground observers (NATO) cca 80 Aircraft

Operation Eagle Eye (Serbian: Operacija Orlovo oko) came into being as a result of the NATO-Kosovo Verification Mission agreement which was signed in Belgrade on 15 October 1998, under which the Federal Republic of Yugoslavia agreed to establish an air surveillance system consisting of NATO non-combatant reconnaissance aircraft and unmanned aerial vehicles.

When a NATO "activation order" was given and dated 30 October 1998, it marked the official launch of the high-tech verification mission. The aim was to monitor the Federal Yugoslav government's compliance with United Nations Security Council Resolution 1199, and in particular the withdrawal of armed forces from Kosovo and compliance with the ceasefire. About 80 aircraft took part in Operation Eagle Eye, four of whom are German Tornado fighter planes. The monitors consisted of 1,400 ground observers. The Serbs did not comply with the resolutions and agreements.

As a result of Yugoslav troop activities and other forms of non-compliance, the ground observers withdrew citing "an unacceptable level of risk to the peace support verification mission", which resulted in an end to aerial verification on 24 March 1999.

== Background ==
The background to NATO's intervention was the repression, expulsion and murder of the Albanian population in Kosovo. Foreign Minister Joschka Fischer called this self-mandate of NATO a "very big exception". The General Secretary, Kofi Annan, acknowledged that "... excessive and indiscriminate use of force by the Serbian security forces and the Yugoslav Army has resulted in numerous civilian casualties and ... the displacement of more than 230,000 people from their homes." These words were incorporated into United Nations Security Council Resolution 1199 passed on 23 September, that demanded a ceasefire in Kosovo, dialogue between the warring parties, the end of action by security forces against civilians, and the safe return of refugees back to Kosovo.

== Operation ==
The monitors consisted of 1,400 ground observers, as well as 80 aircraft to patrol the Yugoslav Army. The operation lasted for 5 months and 26 days until it was terminated on 24 March 1999, during which Michael E. Short commanded the operation. Four days before the termination, Yugoslav forces began a massive campaign of repression and expulsions of Kosovar Albanians following the withdrawal of the OSCE Kosovo Verification Mission and the failure of the proposed Rambouillet Agreement. In response to this, NATO intervened with an aerial bombing campaign that began on March 24, justifying it as a "humanitarian war".

== Termination ==
When Operation Eagle Eye was created, Serbs did not comply with the terms that quickly. Yugoslav troops began to do activities and other forms of non-compliance which forced all 1,400 ground observers to withdraw form Kosovo and the operation was terminated.
