= Shtime Mosque =

Cultural heritage monument of Kosovo

- Xhamia e Shtimes (Albanian)
- Interactive map of Shtime Mosque
- Location: Shtime, Kosovo

History
- Built: 1824

The Shtime Mosque is a cultural heritage monument in Shtime, Kosovo.

== History ==
The Shtime Mosque was built in 1824 near the Shtime River at 1 Ahmet Shtimja St. The mosque has been extensively altered, especially after the construction of a massive reinforced concrete annex next to the original entrance. The old portico of stone, clay mortar, and wooden studs (hatula) is gone as well. The changes are more visible from within than from without, as with the Atik Mosque in Gjilan. The prayer hall is largely authentic, however, with the plastic replacements for old wooden windows kept in their old wood frames.

Not counting the annex, the mosque has 9 prayer hall windows. The walls were plastered in 2004 and decorated from the floor to the windowpane with decorative boards. The mihrab features muqarnas (also known as "stalactite vaulting") in the cone, but the wooden pulpit remains, as in most old mosques, between the mihrab and the side wall. The pulpit includes conical and other geometrical moldings, including a heptagram in a triangular mold, described by the imam as representing that the "separation of the star's corners do not matter, such that they share in their encompassing love for Allah."

The mosque is roofed on the inside by an octagonal dome of wooden planks similar to fish scales. At the top of the dome, a circular wooden slab is decorated geometrically and surrounded by three concentric circles. A frieze runs through the top of the side wall alongside the base. The 2006 annex connects there to the müezzin mahfili with a massive circular dome and its own separate windows. The minaret dates to 1996 and ends in a concrete-brick pyramid (all brick on the seventh and final layer); two balconies are embossed with muqarnas and the spire is topped with a crescent.
