= Bibin =

Bibin is a masculine given name of Indian origin. It is also the possessive form of Biba, a diminutive form of Biljana.

- Bibin Mathew (born 1987), Indian track and field sprinter
- Bibin svijet (Biba's World), Croatian television comedy series
