= Shtime =

Town and municipality in Kosovo

Shtime: Shtime or Shtimja (Albanian) Štimlje or Штимље (Serbian)
- Town and municipality
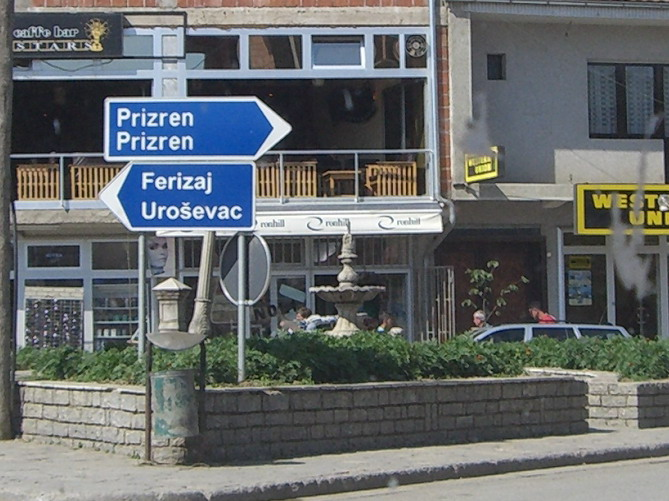

- Flag Emblem
- Interactive map of Shtime
- Location within Kosovo
- Coordinates: 42°26′N 21°02′E
- Country: Kosovo
- District: Ferizaj

Government
  - Mayor: Qemal Aliu (VV)

Area
  - Municipality: 134 km^{2} (52 sq mi)
- Elevation: 565 m (1,854 ft)

Population (2024)
  - Municipality: 24,308
  - Density: 181/km^{2} (470/sq mi)
  - Urban: 7,487
  - Ethnicity: 96.81% Albanians; 3.19% Other
- Demonym(s): Albanian: Shtimjan (m), Shtimjane (f)
- Time zone: UTC+1 (CET)
  - Summer (DST): UTC+2 (CEST)
- Postal code: 72000
- Area code: +383 290
- Vehicle registration: 05
- Website: kk.rks-gov.net/shtime

Shtime (Albanian definite form: Shtimja) or Štimlje (Serbian Cyrillic: Штимље), is a town and municipality located in the Ferizaj District of Kosovo. According to the 2024 census, the town of Shtime has 7,487 inhabitants, while the municipality has 24,308 inhabitants. The territory of the municipality covers an area of 134 km^{2} (52 sq mi).

== History ==
Since the end of the 13th century Shtime was one of four courts of the King of Serbia in Nerodimlje župa. Its position at that time was on the northern bank of Svrčin Lake.

After the mass expulsion of the Albanians from the former Sanjak of Niş by the Principality of Serbia, many Muhaxhir refugee families settled in Shtime and its surroundings. During the Yugoslav colonisation of Kosovo, 95 Serbo-Montenegrin colonist families were settled in Shtime and the surrounding villages by the Yugoslav government. During World War II, Albanians looted and demolished the Serbian church in the municipality.

The municipality of Shtime was established in 1988 by settlements that were previously part of the municipalities of Ferizaj and Lipjan. It was established with a total of 23 settlements: 19 from Ferizaj and 4 from Lipjan. The town itself was chosen as the seat of the municipality.

=== Kosovo War ===
During the Kosovo War, in the village of Reçak, the massacre of 45 civilian Albanians took place by the Serbian forces. The Reçak massacre was the "turning point in the war", as it played a role in NATO's decision to mount an organized military operation against the Federal Republic of Yugoslavia. In late March 1999, Serbian forces set fire to the headquarters of a human rights committee and the Democratic League of Kosovo party, as well as the building that housed the former OSCE mission. Serbian forces also torched homes, shops, and vehicles belonging to Kosovo Albanians, displacing approximately 25,000 civilians, who were forced to flee to villages in the south. In early April 1999, it was reported that Serbian forces killed five Kosovo Albanian civilians in the area.

== Geography ==
Shtime lies on the western part of the Kosovo field, and it has a central position in Kosovo. In the western side of the municipality is located the Carraleva mountain, which is the source of the river that passes through the town named Shtimjana.

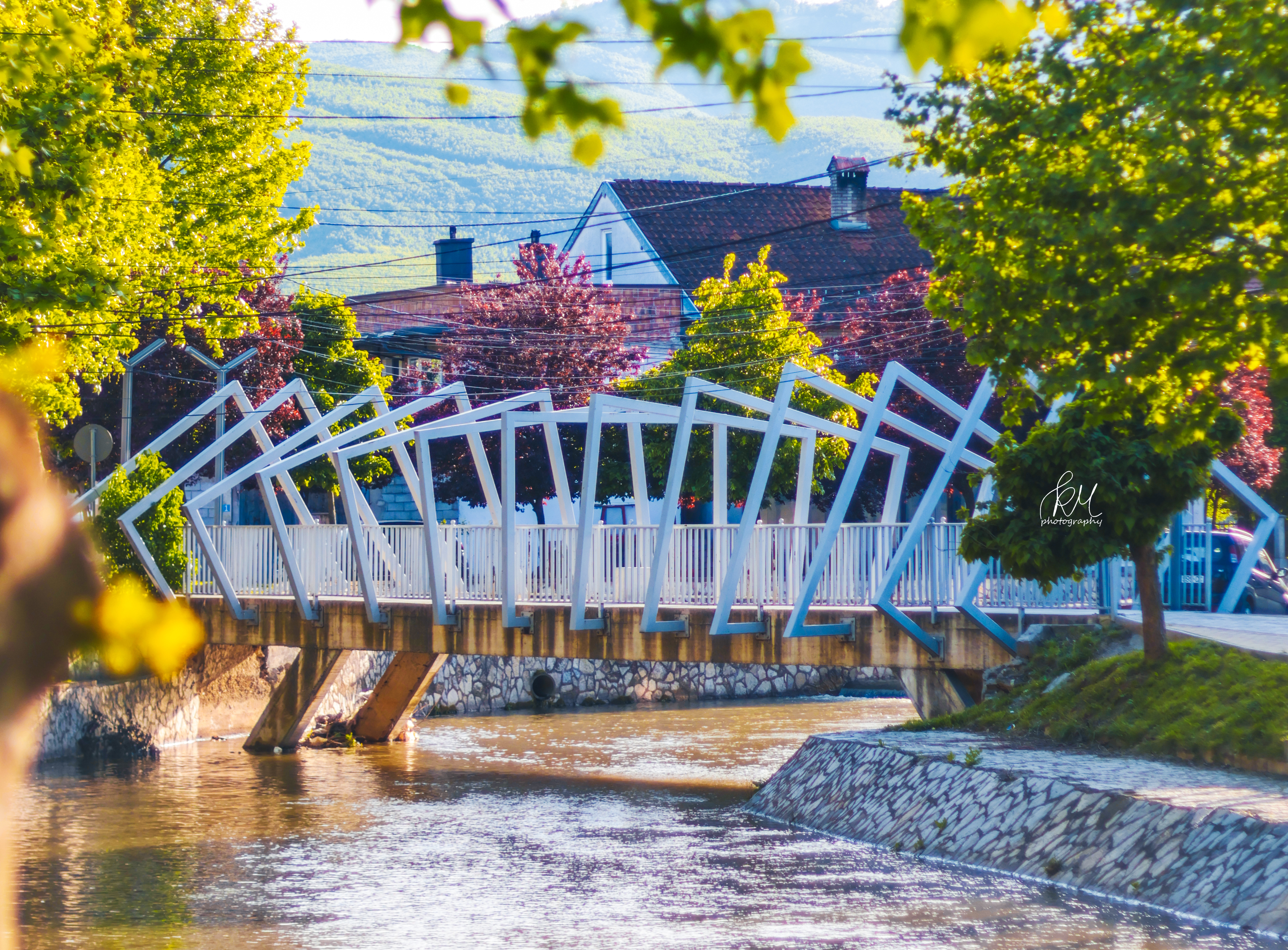
The Shtimjana river

The municipality of Shtime is surrounded by the municipalities of Ferizaj in the east and south, Lipjan in the north and Suharekë in the western side. Shtime is around 12 km (7.5 mi) away from Ferizaj and around 13 km (8.1 mi) away from Lipjan.

== Demographics ==
According to the last census of 2024 by the Kosovo Agency of Statistics, Shtime has 24,308 inhabitants of whom 7,487 live in the town.

The overwhelming majority of the population is ethnic Albanian at around 96.8%, while the minority are Ashkali. The Albanians of Shtime, as of Albanians in all of Kosovo, speak the Gheg dialect of the Albanian language.
