= This Grave Is Too Small for Me =

2013 dramatic stage production

This Grave Is Too Small for Me (Serbian: Mali mi je ovaj grob, alternatively given translations such as This Tomb Is Too Small) is a dramatic stage production, written by Serbian playwright Biljana Srbljanović, that focuses on assassin Gavrilo Princip and his associates in the weeks leading up to Princip's murder of Archduke Franz Ferdinand in 1914. The assassination played a major role in world events and moved things towards the breakout of World War I. As a historically based work adapting the controversial period, moral conflicts and other character-driven issues are explored although many details have been changed.

The stage play made its debut at the Schauspielhaus in Vienna in October 2013. It has received favorable reactions from crowds in a variety of different cities in which it has been performed, including Berlin and Belgrade.

Srbljanović has remarked that she feels "not very much into history and utterly not interested in World War I" yet found Princip's story fascinating given the figure's challenging ethical and philosophical ideas. In October 2014, the play won two awards during the International Theatre Festival of Small and Experimental Stage (MESS) ceremony; one award went to Srbljanović herself and another went to Sarajevo-based actor Ermin Bravo, for best stage performance.

== See also ==
- Assassinations in fiction
- Death of Archduke Franz Ferdinand of Austria
- Historical fiction
