= Kosovo Diplomatic Observer Mission =

- Abbreviation: KDOM
- Successor: Kosovo Verification Mission
- Formation: 6 July 1998
- Dissolved: 25 October 1998
- Headquarters: Pristina, Kosovo
- Region served: Kosovo, Yugoslavia
- Parent organization: Balkan Contact Group
- Staff: ~50

The Kosovo Diplomatic Observer Mission (KDOM) was a group of independent observers deployed Kosovo between July 1998 and October 1998 during the Kosovo War.

In a compromise agreement between Slobodan Milošević and Boris Yeltsin on 16 June 1998, the FR Yugoslavian government agreed to accept an independent observer mission. This was initially a group of approximately fifty diplomats from different countries, who acted as observers in Kosovo and relayed information to the international community. Embassy staff were augmented with additional military and diplomatic personnel. Canada called their involvement Operation Perseverance.

The KDOM reported that Yugoslav state forces continued widespread attacks even after Resolution 1199; in particular, KDOM reported on atrocities around Pristina: "KDOM reported that the bodies of several women and children had been found near the village of Gornje Obrinje to the west of Pristina. The victims had been shot in the back of the head at close range as they tried to escape."

KDOM succeeded in brokering ceasefires around Pristina, encouraging the withdrawal of some army tanks and armoured vehicles from Kosovo.

In September, the OSCE's Kosovo Verification Mission was set up to replace the KDOM; it was augmented by NATO's Operation Eagle Eye which provided additional evidence.
