= Ivan Todosijević =

Kosovo Serb politician

Ivan Todosijević (Serbian Cyrillic: Иван Тодосијевић; born 16 July 1973) is a Serbian politician. He was a minister in the Kosovo government from 2017 to 2019 and a member of the Assembly of Kosovo from 2019 to 2021. He has also been designated by the Serbian government since 2015 as the leader of Zvečan's provisional authority, a position not recognized by the Republic of Kosovo government. Todosijević is a member of the Serbian Progressive Party (SNS) and Kosovo's Serb List (SL).

In 2019, Todosijević was convicted by a court in Priština of incitement to national, racial, ethnic, or religious intolerance after saying that the identification of Yugoslavia's January 1999 Račak operation as a "massacre" was a fabrication by "Albanian terrorists" used to justify the NATO bombing of Yugoslavia. A retrial resulted in the same verdict in October 2022. In July 2023, the Supreme Court of Kosovo overturned the ruling and issued Todosijević a full acquittal.

== Early life and career ==
Todosijević was born in Kosovska Mitrovica, in what was then the Socialist Autonomous Province of Kosovo in the Socialist Republic of Serbia, Socialist Federal Republic of Yugoslavia. He received his early education there and in neighbouring Zvečan, and later graduated from the University of Priština Faculty of Agriculture with a focus on fruit growing and viticulture. He was awarded a master's degree in 2010 for a thesis on the production of Cabernet Sauvignon grapes in North Mitrovica. Since 2002, he has been manager of horticulture at the JKP Standard in North Mitrovica.

== Politician ==
A candidate named Ivan Todosijević appeared in the nineteenth and final position on the electoral list of the Serbian Renewal Movement (SPO) for the 2002 Kosovo local elections in Zvečan. It is not confirmed that this was the same person.

=== Local government in Zvečan (2013–17) ===
The governments of Serbia and the Republic of Kosovo partially normalized their relations under the 2013 Brussels Agreement, which did not address the status of Kosovo. Following the agreement, the Serbian government encouraged Kosovo Serbs to participate in Priština's governing institutions while also appointing its own provisional municipal authorities throughout Kosovo. The latter authorities have never been recognized by the Republic of Kosovo, which considers them as illegitimate.

The Serbian government appointed Todosijević to Zvečan's provisional governing council in September 2013. He stood down from this role in January 2014 and was appointed as director of JKSP Zvečan in the same year. On 30 September 2015, the Serbian government appointed him as president of Zvečan's provisional authority.

Todosijević appeared in the lead position on the Serb List's electoral list for the Zvečan municipal assembly in the 2017 local elections sponsored by Priština. He was elected when the Serb List won a majority victory with thirteen out of nineteen seats.

=== Government Minister (2017–19) ===
Ramush Haradinaj of the Alliance for the Future of Kosovo (AAK) became prime minister of Kosovo for a second time in September 2017. The Serb List participated in his government and received three ministerial positions; Todosijević was appointed as minister of administration and local government. His appointment attracted some controversy, due to his holding of a Serbian government position in Zvečan that the Priština government considers as illegal. As a minister, Todosijević was a prominent advocate for the establishment of a Community of Serb Municipalities in Kosovo, as envisioned by the Brussels Agreement.

In March 2019, Todosijević spoke at an event commemorating the twentieth anniversary of the NATO bombing of Yugoslavia. Among other things, he said, "the reason for the aggression against our country was the so-called humanitarian catastrophe in Kosovo and Metohija, the fictional Račak." He also referred to "Albanian terrorists" as having committed the greatest crimes in Kosovo, using the word "Šiptar" (often considered as offensive) for Albanians. On 8 April 2019, Haradinaj dismissed Todosijević from office because of these statements. Legal proceedings were also launched against him.

=== Parliamentarian (2019–21) ===
Todosijević appeared in the fifth position on the Serb List's electoral list in the 2019 Kosovan parliamentary election. Assembly elections in Kosovo are held under open list proportional representation; Todosijević finished sixth among his party's candidates and was elected when the list won ten mandates. The Serb List again participated in Kosovo's coalition government after the election, and Todosijević served as a government supporter. He was a member of the committee on the rights and interests of communities and returns.

On 5 December 2019, a basic court in Priština convicted Todosijević of incitement to intolerance for his statements about Račak and imposed a two-year prison sentence. He appealed the decision. As the verdict was not final, he did not lose his seat in parliament.

He again appeared in the fifth position on the Serb List's list in the 2021 parliamentary election, placed fifth among the party's candidates, and was re-elected when the List again won ten mandates. After the election, he served with the Serb List in opposition to Albin Kurti's second administration.

Todosijević led the Serb List's list for Zvečan's municipal assembly in the 2021 local elections and was re-elected when the SL won a landslide victory with eighteen out of nineteen seats.

=== Legal proceedings and final acquittal (2021–23) ===
Kosovo's Court of Appeals confirmed the original verdict and sentence against Todosijević on 24 August 2021. He did not show up to begin his sentence in October 2021; his lawyer said that he did not receive a summons as required by law. He lost his seat in the Zvečan assembly on 23 November 2021 by a decision of Kosovo's electoral commission and shortly thereafter was deprived of his parliamentary mandate.

Serbian president Aleksandar Vučić offered support to Todosjiveć in this period, endorsing his description of Račak as a fabrication. Todosijević's supporters also argued that the composition of the judicial panel (which had three Albanian justices and no Serbs) was a violation of the terms of the Brussels Agreement. The European Commission endorsed the latter position in its October 2021 report on Kosovo.

On 28 December 2021, the Supreme Court of Kosovo quashed Todosijević's conviction and ordered a new trial. This led to the same outcome as the original trial; he was convicted in October 2022 of inciting ethnic hatred. Kosovo's Court of Appeals upheld the verdict in March 2023, but the Supreme Court of Kosovo overturned it in July 2023, issuing Todosijević a full acquittal.

The Serb List began boycotting the political institutions recognized by Priština in November 2022, against the backdrop of the ongoing North Kosovo crisis. The Serbian government continues to recognize Todosijević as the leader of a provisional authority in Zvečan.
