= Clark-Naumann agreement =

- Signed: October 25, 1998
- Mediators: Wesley Clark; Klaus Naumann
- Signatories: Nikola Šainović
- Parties: NATO; FR Yugoslavia
- Language: English

The Clark-Naumann agreement between NATO and FR Yugoslavia (FRY) provided for the partial withdrawal of FRY forces (VJ) and Serbian forces (MUP) from the Autonomous Province of Kosovo, the limitation of new forces, and deployment of OSCE verifiers (the Kosovo Verification Mission). NATO and FRY representatives met on 25 October 1998 to discuss steps for full compliance with UNSCR 1199 (23 September 1998). It was signed by Nikola Šainović, Vice Prime Minister of FRY government.
