= Biljana platno beleše =

Folk song from Vardar Macedonia

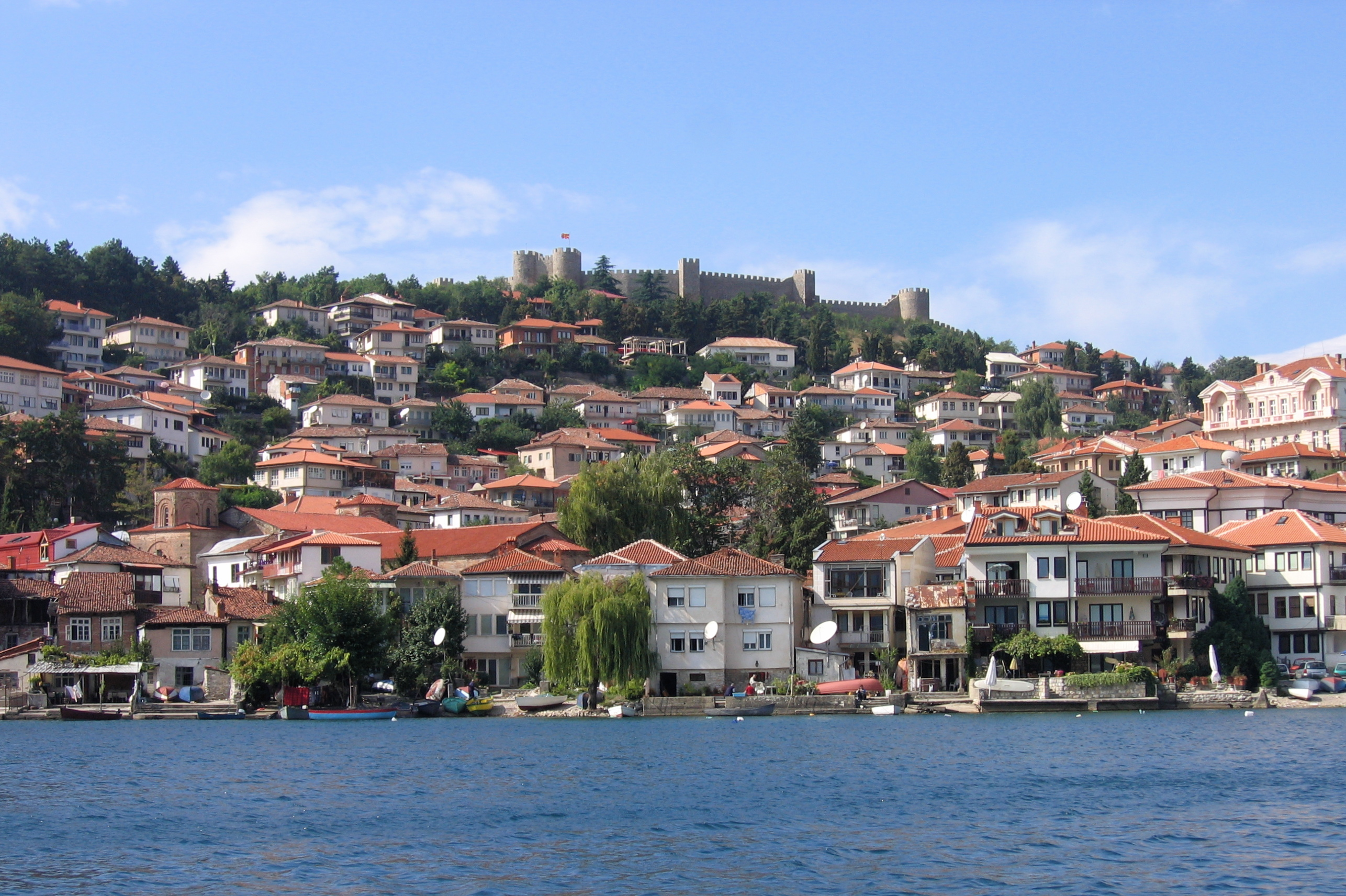
A view of the city of Ohrid from Lake Ohrid, whose springs are mentioned in the song.

Biljana platno beleše (Bulgarian: Биляна платно белеше; Macedonian: Билјана платно белеше, Macedonian pronunciation: [ˈbiljana ˈpɫatnɔ ˈbɛlɛʃɛ]; "Biljana was bleaching linen") is a folk song from Vardar Macedonia. In Bulgaria it is considered a Bulgarian folk song. In North Macedonia it is viewed as a Macedonian folk song.

== Plot ==
A young girl, Biljana, is washing linen as a dowry for her upcoming wedding at a spring of the Ohrid Lake. A caravan of vintners soon come and are charmed by her beauty. She warns them not to step on her linen. They try to impress her with their riches, saying that they will pay with their wine if they step on the linen. But she does not want their wine. To common surprise (and in conflict with the original intent to marry someone else), she falls for a young man riding their carriage and tells them that she likes him. The group of men reply that the young man is already engaged to another, that the wine they carry is for him, and that he is to be married that Sunday. The love was carried on by the waters of the source.

== History and origins ==
Motifs from this song can be found in collections Folk Songs of the Macedonian Bulgarians by Stefan Verkovic (1860) and in the Bulgarian Folk Songs by Miladinov brothers (1861). The text and the musical notation of the song were published in the periodical bulletin of the Bulgarian Academy of Sciences Collection of folklore in 1894. Nevertheless, the same motifs (maid bleaching linen on the river and falling in love with passing vintner/kiradgee) are also found in different songs through the whole of the former Bulgarian folklore area (incl. Macedonia): from the Lake Ohrid to the Black Sea, and from the Danube River to the Aegean Sea.

== Performers ==
The song has been interpreted by numerous artists throughout the Balkans. The first accounted interpretation was that of the Ohrid local performers in the early 19th century, though the original source is unspecified as it was probably passed down through oral tradition. Its text was used in a composition by Serbian Romantic-era composer Stevan Stojanović Mokranjac, and in more recent times it has been interpreted by Dobri Stavrevski, Nikola Badev, Vaska Ilieva, Toše Proeski, Slavi Trifonov, etc.
