= Biljana Coković =

Macedonian swimmer

Personal information
- Born: July 30, 1982 Skopje, Yugoslavia
- Died: September 5, 2007 (aged 25) Bartow, Florida, United States

Sport
- Sport: Swimming

Biljana Coković (or Cokovik; Macedonian: Билјана Цоковиќ; 30 July 1982 – 5 September 2007) was a Macedonian swimmer. She was born in Skopje. She competed in the 10 km event in 1st FINA World Open Water Swimming Championships and took 15th place. She died in a car accident in Bartow, Florida.
