= Biljana Pavićević =

Biljana Pavićević may refer to:

- Biljana Pavićević (handballer) (born 1988), Montenegrin women's handball player
- Biljana Pavićević (basketballer) (born 1980), Montenegrin women's basketball player
