= Biljana Šljivić-Šimšić =

Professor of Slavic languages

- Born: Biljana Šljivić

Academic background
- Education: Harvard University
- Thesis: Deklinacija u paštrovskim ispravama 16–18. veka (1966)

Biljana Šljivić-Šimšić (Serbian Cyrillic: Биљана Шљивић-Шимшић; 20 January 1933 – 4 October 2019) was a professor emeritus at the University of Illinois and an author of several scholastic books, including a Serbian-English dictionary.

== Early life and education ==
Biljana Šljivić was born in 1933 in Belgrade, Serbia, Kingdom of Yugoslavia. She obtained a degree from the University of Belgrade. In 1962, she moved from Yugoslavia to the United States, and went on to earn a master's degree and a Ph.D. from Harvard University (1966).

== Career ==
In 1967 Šljivić-Šimšić was appointed assistant professor at the University of Pennsylvania. She was also a research associate to Morton Benson at the University of Pennsylvania, and she is credited as a collaborator in the 1971 edition of the Serbocroatian-English dictionary that was first published in 1971 with the most recent edition dated 2017. Šljivić arrived at the University of Illinois at Chicago in 1973, and spent the rest of her career there. First an associate professor, then a full professor, she was also the head of the Department of Slavic and Baltic Languages and Literature. She was named emeritus in 2009. In addition to the dictionary, Šljivić-Šimšić is known for textbooks used for learning the Serbian language.

She was one of the founders of the North American Society for Serbian Studies, its first secretary treasurer (1978-1983) and its president (1984-1986).

== Selected publications ==
- SerboCroatian-English Dictionary. University of Pennsylvania Press. 1971. ISBN 9780812276367.
- Silverman, Joseph H.; Armistead, Samuel Gordon (1971). Judeo-Spanish Ballads from Bosnia. Biljana Šljivić-Šimšić. University of Pennsylvania Press. ISBN 9780835797474.
- Šljivić-Šimšić, Biljana (1985). Serbo-Croatian, Just for You: A First Year Course. Center for Slavic & East European Studies.
- Sljivic-Simsic, Biljana; Price, Robert F. (January 1987). Advanced Serbo-Croatian 2. Foreign Language Publications. ISBN 9780874151336.

== Honors ==
In 2021 there was a monograph published to honor her work.
