= Biljana Savović =

Serbian politician

Biljana Savović (Serbian Cyrillic: Биљана Савовић; born 27 June 1960) is a former politician in Serbia. She served in the National Assembly of Serbia from 2014 to 2016 as a member of the Serbian Progressive Party.

== Early life and private career ==
Savović is a lawyer in private life. She lives in Sečanj in Vojvodina.

== Politician ==
=== Municipal politics ===
Savović was elected to the Sečanj municipal assembly in the 2008 Serbian local elections on the local electoral list "For the development of the municipality of Sečanj." She was chosen as president (i.e., speaker) of the assembly after the election. She later joined the Democratic Party and served on its board for the Central Banat District.

She was re-elected in the 2012 local elections and was re-appointed as speaker for the next sitting of the assembly. She also appeared in the 234th position on the Democratic Party's Choice for a Better Life list in the 2012 Serbian parliamentary election. The list won sixty-seven mandates, and she was not returned.

In 2014, Savović and several other local Democratic Party members joined the Progressive Party. Following the 2016 local elections, she was appointed as assistant to the mayor. In 2019, she was also appointed as coordinator of Sečanj's newly created office for poverty reduction.

She received the fourteenth position on the Progressive Party's electoral list in the 2020 local elections. The list won thirteen mandates, and she was not returned. She had the opportunity to return the local assembly following the resignation of other members, but she was instead re-appointed as assistant to the mayor.

=== Parliamentarian ===
Savović received the 132nd position on the Progressive Party's Aleksandar Vučić — Future We Believe In list in the 2014 Serbian parliamentary election and was elected when the list won a landslide victory with 158 mandates. For the next two years, he served in the assembly as a supporter of Vučić's administration. She received the 183rd position on the successor Aleksandar Vučić – Serbia Is Winning list in the 2016 election and was not returned when the list won 131 mandates.
