= OSCE Mission in Kosovo =

- Abbreviation: OMiK
- Predecessor: Kosovo Verification Mission / OSCE Transitional Task Force for Kosovo
- Formation: 1 July 1999
- Headquarters: Pristina, Kosovo
- Region served: Kosovo
- Head of Mission: Gerard McGurk
- Parent organization: Organization for Security and Co-operation in Europe
- Budget: 17,462,600 euros
- Staff: 490
- Website: www.osce.org/mission-in-kosovo

The OSCE Mission in Kosovo (OMiK) is a field mission of the Organization for Security and Co-operation in Europe operating in Kosovo. The mission was deployed in July 1999 to support the United Nations Interim Administration Mission in Kosovo (UNMIK) in the field of democratisation, institution building and human rights in Kosovo.

== Mandate ==
The mandate of the mission was set out in OSCE Permanent Council Decision No. 305 of 1 July 1999. The mission forms one of the pillars of the United Nations Interim Administration Mission in Kosovo relating to democratisation, institution building and human rights. The core objectives as mandated were to establish a police school to train officers for a new Kosovo Police Service, to train members of the judiciary, to organise and monitor elections, to support the development civil society, non-governmental organisations and political parties, to establish an Ombudsman institution and to monitor and protect human rights.

== Heads of Mission ==
The current Head of the mission is Gerard McGurk.

Head	Country	Term of office
Dan Everts	Netherlands	1999–2001
Pascal Fieschi	France	2001–2005
Werner Wnendt	Germany	2005–2007
Tim Guldimann	Switzerland	2007–2008
Werner Almhofer	Austria	2008–2012
Jean-Claude Schlumberger	France	2012–2016
Jan Braathu	Norway	2016–2020
Michael Davenport	United Kingdom	2020–2025
Gerard McGurk	United Kingdom	2025–present

== Gallery ==
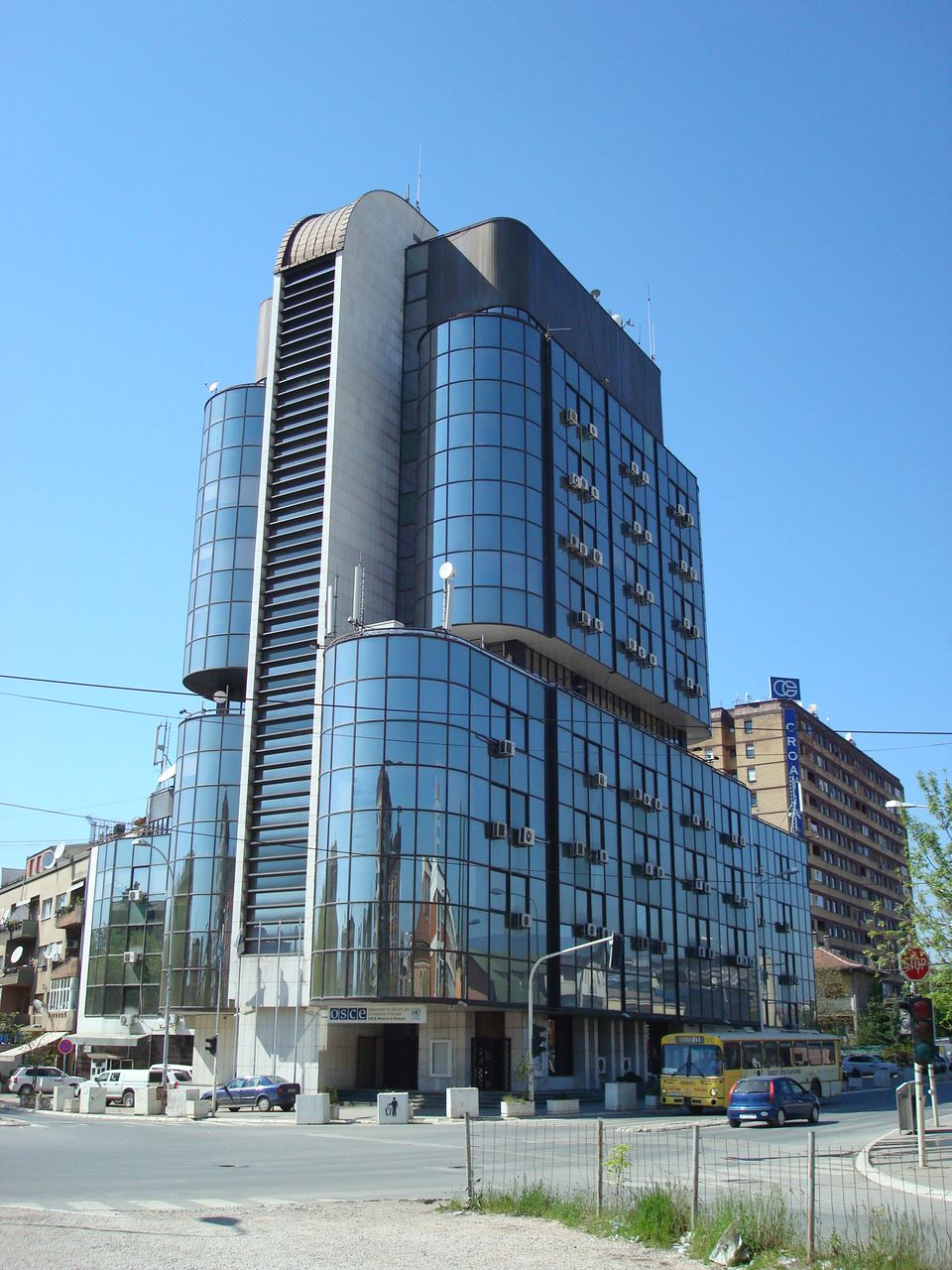
Headquarters of the OSCE Mission in Kosovo in Pristina

== See also ==
- Kosovo Verification Mission
- European Union Rule of Law Mission in Kosovo
