= Serbia Film Commission =

Non-profit association of Serbian

The Serbia Film Commission (Srpska filmska asocijacija in Serbian) is a private non-profit association of Serbian film companies and freelancers. In July 2009, 16 prominent film industry representatives established the Serbia Film Commission as an association of companies and freelancers based on best practice models of film commissions around the globe. The Association is governed by the Board of Directors and managed by an Executive Director.

The Commission's principal aim is to promote Serbia as a film location and support domestic and international film productions by fostering a film friendly environment. Commission members include leading feature film, television, commercials and animation producers. The Serbia Film Commission became a member of the Association of Film Commissioners International (AFCI) in February 2010.

== Tradition ==
Serbia’s film tradition dates back more than half a century. Hitting its peak in the early 1980s, the country’s industry ranked second only to the United Kingdom in the number of overseas productions. The region of the former Yugoslavia, particularly Serbia’s capital Belgrade and Avala Film Studios, served as locations for a number epic American films, including Long Ships, Kelly's Heroes, The Aviator, Shatterhand, Castle Keep, Genghis Khan and The Fortunate Pilgrim starring Sophia Loren. The region has also served as a location for a number of Italian, German and Russian productions.

== Aims ==
The principal aim of the Serbia Film Commission is to promote and develop Serbia as a cost-effective, high-quality, competitive destination for international filmmaking, and to provide information and support to international filmmakers considering Serbia for productions. The Commission and its members regularly attend film and advertising markets, including Cannes, the Locations Trade Show in Santa Monica, California, the Sarajevo Film Festival and other major industry events.

Key focus areas of the Serbia Film Commission include:

- International promotion of Serbia as a competitive film location;
- Introduction of film incentives;
- Fostering a film friendly environment;
- Improving the business environment for local film enterprises and;
- Coordinating with education institutions to provide industry-specific skills trainings.

== Recent productions ==
In the past three years, Serbia has served as a location for a number of productions, most recently The Raven directed by James McTeigue, EuropaCorp's Lock Out with Guy Pearce and Maggie Grace, and Ralph Fiennes’ adaptation of Shakespeare’s Coriolanus.

== Brand and logo ==
The Serbia Film Commission (SFC) and the Film in Serbia tagline are branded. The Commission’s logo is a multi–color graphic based on a traditional Serbian weaving pattern featuring film perforations.
