= Reçak =

Reçak Рачак Račak
- Village
- Location within Kosovo
- Coordinates: 42.429296°N 21.017014°E
- Location: Kosovo
- District: Ferizaj
- Municipality: Shtime

Population (2024)
  - Total: 1,265
- Time zone: UTC+1 (CET)
  - Summer (DST): UTC+2 (CEST)

Reçak (Albanian: Reçak; Serbian: Рачак / Račak) is a village in the Shtime municipality of Kosovo.

It was the site of the January 1999 Račak massacre, in which 45 villagers were killed by Serbian forces.

== History ==
=== Middle Ages ===
The village was first mentioned in a chrysobull by the Serbian Emperor Stefan Dušan in 1343. Noted in an Ottoman defter of 1487, the village was home to a monastery, consecrated in the name of Saints Cosmas and Damian.

=== Kosovo War ===
Prior to the summer of 1998, Račak had a population of around 2,000 people. Most of its population was displaced by fighting between the Yugoslav Army and soldiers from the Kosovo Liberation Army (KLA) in July 1998.

By January 1999, about 350 people had returned to the village, according to the Organization for Security and Co-operation in Europe (OSCE). On 16 January 1999, OSCE monitors found the bodies of 45 people in and around the village in what became widely known as the Račak massacre. Following the incident, for which the international community blamed the Serbian military, the remaining population fled and did not return until the end of the Kosovo War in June 1999.

There is a memorial to the victims of the massacre in the village, where an annual ceremony to honour them is held.

== Geography ==
Reçak is located about half a kilometer southwest of the town of Shtime. The village lies on the Carraleva-mountain range. This mountain range divides the Kosovo field and Metohija.

=== Climate ===
Climate data for Zhur/Žur (1982-2012)
Month	Jan	Feb	Mar	Apr	May	Jun	Jul	Aug	Sep	Oct	Nov	Dec	Year
Mean daily maximum °C	2.4	5.1	10.4	15	20	23.7	26.2	26.4	22.8	16.3	8.4	3.7	15.0
Mean daily minimum °C	−4.1	−2.5	0.9	4.6	8.7	11.9	13.5	13.3	10.3	6.1	1.4	−2.4	5.1
Average rainfall mm	64	57	59	63	79	60	52	47	58	69	84	76	768
Mean daily maximum °F	36.3	41.2	50.7	59	68	74.7	79.2	79.5	73.0	61.3	47.1	38.7	59.1
Mean daily minimum °F	24.6	27.5	33.6	40.3	47.7	53.4	56.3	55.9	50.5	43.0	34.5	27.7	41.2
Average rainfall inches	2.5	2.2	2.3	2.5	3.1	2.4	2.0	1.9	2.3	2.7	3.3	3.0	30.2

== Population ==
As of the census of 2024, Reçak had a population of 1,265 of whom 1,264 were Albanians.

Development
Year	Population
1948	613
1953	675
1961	865
1971	1,092
1981	1,464
1991	1,766
2011	1,638
2024	1,265
