= Rambouillet conference =

1999 diplomatic conference in France

Coordinates: 48°38′43.4″N 1°49′2.7″E

The Rambouillet Conference was an international diplomatic conference held between 6 February and 22 March 1999 at the Château de Rambouillet, France, in an attempt to resolve the Kosovo crisis. The talks resulted in the drafting of a proposed Interim Agreement for Peace and Self-Government in Kosovo (Rambouillet Agreement), between the Federal Republic of Yugoslavia and the Republic of Serbia on the one hand and the delegation of political representatives of the ethnic Albanian majority population of Kosovo on the other. Among other things, the proposed agreement called for substantial autonomy for Kosovo; the deployment of up to 30,000 NATO peacekeeping troops in Kosovo; an unhindered right of passage for NATO troops on Yugoslav territory; and immunity for NATO and its agents to Yugoslav law. The Kosovo Albanian side signed the agreement on 18 March 1999, however the refusal of the Yugoslav and Serbian side to sign the accords led to the 1999 bombing of Yugoslavia.

== Interim Agreement for Peace and Self-Government in Kosovo ==
Rambouillet Agreement
Interim Agreement for Peace and Self-Government in Kosovo
- Type: Proposed Peace agreement
- Context: Insurgency in Kosovo (1995–1998)
- Drafted: 23 February 1999
- Signed: 18 March 1999
- Location: Rambouillet, France
- Mediators: Robin Cook; Hubert Védrine
- Original signatories: Ibrahim Rugova, Hashim Thaçi, Rexhep Qosja, Veton Surroi
- Parties: Kosovo
- Language: English

Full text
- Kosovo Rambouillet Agreement 1999 at Wikisource
- Rambouillet Agreement

The provisions of the proposed agreement included:

1. "Kosovo will have a president, prime minister, and government, an assembly, its own Supreme Court, constitutional court and other courts."
2. "Kosovo will have the authority to make laws not subject to revision by Serbia or the Federal Republic of Yugoslavia, including levying taxes, instituting programs of economic, scientific, technological, regional and social development, conducting foreign relations within its area of responsibility in the same manner as a Republic."
3. "Yugoslav army forces and Serb security forces will withdraw completely from Kosovo, except for a limited border guard force (active only within a 5 kilometer border zone)."
4. "The parties invite NATO to deploy a military force (KFOR), which will be authorized to use necessary force to ensure compliance with the accords."
5. "The international community will play a role in ensuring that these provisions are carried out through a Civilian Implementation Mission (CIM) appointed by NATO".
6. "The Chief of the CIM has the authority to issue binding directives to the Parties on all important matters he sees fit, including appointing and removing officials and curtailing institutions."
7. "Three years after the implementation of the Accords, an international meeting will be convened to determine a mechanism for a final settlement for Kosovo on the basis of the will of its People."
8. "NATO personnel shall enjoy, together with their vehicles, vessels, aircraft, and equipment, free and unrestricted passage and unimpeded access throughout the Federal Republic of Yugoslavia including associated airspace and territorial waters. This shall include, but not be limited to, the right of bivouac, maneuver, billet and utilization of any areas or facilities as required for support, training, and operations."
9. "NATO is granted the use of airports roads, rails, and ports without payment of fees, duties, dues, tolls, or charges occasioned by mere use."
10. "Yugoslavia and Kosovo shall, upon simple request, grant all telecommunications services, including broadcast services, needed for the Operation, as determined by NATO, This shall include the right to utilize such means and services as required to assure full ability to communicate and the right to use all of the electromagnetic spectrum for this purpose, free of cost."
11. "In the conduct of the Operation, NATO may need to make improvements or modifications to certain infrastructure in the FRY, such as roads, bridges, tunnels, buildings, and utility systems."
12. "NATO shall be immune from all legal process, whether civil, administrative, or criminal."
13. "NATO personnel, under all circumstances and at all times, shall be immune from the Parties, jurisdiction in respect of any civil, administrative, criminal or disciplinary offenses which may be committed by them in the FRY."
14. "NATO personnel shall be immune from any form of arrest, investigation, or detention by the authorities in the FRY."

== Proposed autonomy for Kosovo ==
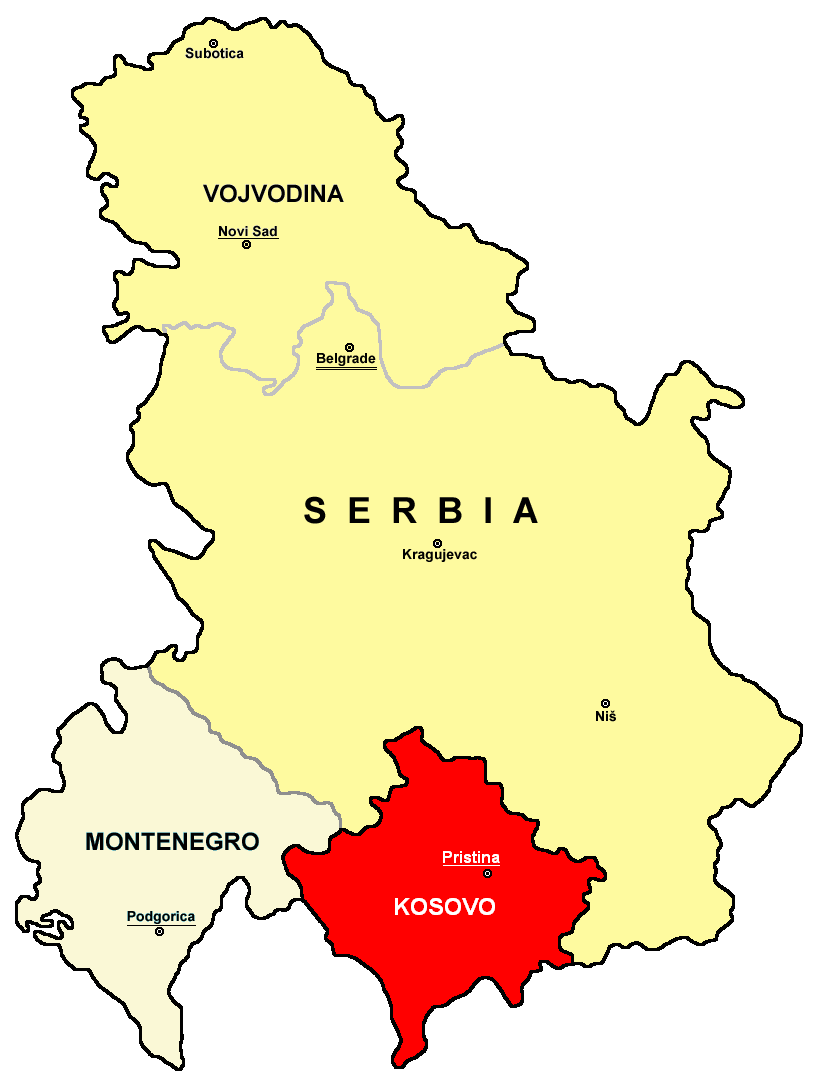
Location of Kosovo within the Federal Republic of Yugoslavia

The Rambouillet Agreement included a constitution creating a system of democratic self-governance for Kosovo within the Federal Republic of Yugoslavia. It would have established executive, legislative and judicial branches of government, a system of local government and law enforcement institutions.

=== Competencies ===
==== Federal Republic of Yugoslavia and Republic of Serbia ====
The Federal Republic of Yugoslavia would have competency over territorial integrity, maintaining a common market, monetary policy, defense, foreign policy, customs services, federal taxation, and federal elections. The federal government would maintain border crossings at Kosovo's external borders with Albania and North Macedonia and would exercise authority in connection with the enforcement of federal immigration laws.

The Republic of Serbia would have competence in relation to republic level elections in Kosovo.

Kosovo would be entitled to at least 10 seats in the federal parliament and at least 20 seats in the Serbian parliament. Kosovo would be entitled to at least one minister in the federal government, one minister in the government of Serbia, one judge in the federal constitutional court, one in the federal court and three judges in the supreme court of Serbia.

==== Kosovo ====
Kosovo would have competency over all matters not reserved to the Federal Republic of Yugoslavia and the Republic of Serbia. The institutions of Kosovo would be able to make laws in areas they have competency and would be able to levy taxes, and institute programs for economic, scientific, technological, regional and social development.

Kosovo would be able to conduct foreign relations within its areas of competency including the right to maintain relations with foreign states, establish missions abroad, and join international organisations.

=== Institutions ===
The Rambouillet Agreement proposed the establishment of executive, legislative and judicial organs in Kosovo.

==== Legislative branch ====
Kosovo was to have an 120 member assembly of which 80 would be directly elected. Of the remaining 40 members, 10 would be elected by communities representing between 0.5 and 5% and 30 would be shared equally between the Albanian and Serb communities. The assembly would be led by a president, two vice-presidents.

==== Executive branch ====
Kosovo would have had a president elected by the assembly for a three year term renewable once. Executive power would be exercised by a government led by a prime minister, proposed by the president and confirmed by the assembly.

==== Judicial branch ====
Kosovo was to have a constitutional court, a supreme court, district courts, and communal courts. The constitutional court and supreme court would each have 9 judges. An office of the prosecutor, led by a chief prosecutor, would be responsible for prosecuting individuals who violate the criminal laws of Kosovo. With the exception of immigration and customs related crimes, any person arrested within Kosovo would subject to the jurisdiction of the Kosovo courts. The rights and freedoms set forth in the European Convention on Human Rights would apply directly in Kosovo. An ombudsman institution would be established to protect human and community rights in Kosovo.

==== Local government ====
Kosovo's existing communes would continue to exist and would elect their own municipal assemblies and executive councils.

==== Law enforcement ====
Communal police units would be established throughout Kosovo with responsibility police patrols, crime prevention, criminal investigations, arrest and detention of criminal suspects, crowd control, and traffic control. Communal police officers may be equipped with a sidearm, handcuffs, a baton, and, a radio and would be required to wear a badge, picture identification, and name tag. Each unit would be led by a communal commander, appointed by the local communal assembly. A criminal justice administration would be established to coordinate law enforcement operations across Kosovo.

==== Security ====
The Rambouillet Agreement authorised the deployment of a 30,000 strong NATO-led multi-national military implementation force into Kosovo.

== Negotiating parties ==
The negotiations were chaired by British Foreign Secretary Robin Cook and French Foreign Minister Hubert Védrine. At times, US Secretary of State Madeleine Albright and German Foreign Minister Joschka Fischer also took part in the talks.

Three parties were involved in the negotiations:

- the Contact Group, which included representatives from the United States, the European Union and Russia; Christopher Hill for the US, Wolfgang Petritsch for the EU and Boris Majorski for Russia.
- the 16-member delegation of Kosovo: Hashim Thaçi (leader of the Kosovo Liberation Army), Ibrahim Rugova (the leader of the ethnic Albanian community in Kosovo), philosophy professor and Rugova confidant Fehmi Agani, journalist Veton Surroi, Rexhep Qosja, KLA spokesman Jakup Krasniqi, former Rugova employee and KLA representative Ram Buja, among others.
- the delegation of the Federal Republic of Yugoslavia was initially led by Serbian Deputy Prime Minister Ratko Marković before Serbian President Milan Milutinović took over the leadership when he joined the delegation at the beginning of the second week of negotiations, on 13 February. The delegation included Federal Deputy Prime Minister Nikola Šainović, Federal Deputy Prime Minister Vladan Kutlešić, Serbian Deputy Government Spokesman Vladimir Stambuk, Chairman of the Socialist Party in Kosovo Vojislav Živković, Member of the Kosovo and Methoja Provisional Executive Council Guljbehar Sabović, the representative of the national Muslim community Refik Senadović, the representative of the Turkish national community and the Turkish Democratic Party Zejnelabidin Kurejs, representative of the national community of the Gorans Ibro Vait, President of the Kosovo Democratic Initiative Faik Jasari, President of the Democratic Reform Party of Albanians Sokolj Cuse, the representative of the Roma national community Ljuan Koka, the representative of the Egyptian national community Cerim Abazi.

== Negotiations ==
=== Rambouillet ===
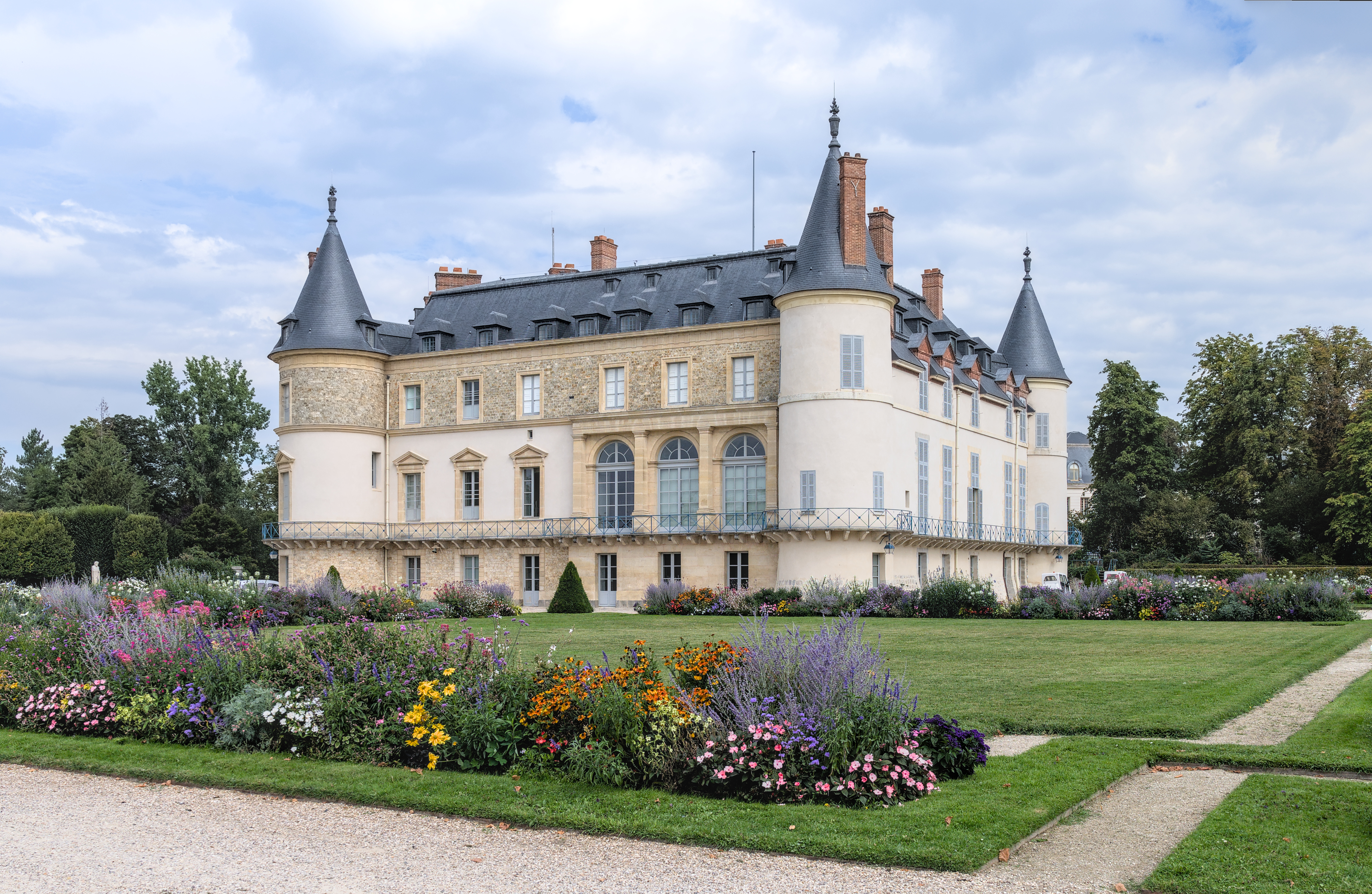
The Château de Rambouillet where the negotiations took place

The conference commenced Château de Rambouillet near Paris on 6 February 1999, co-chaired by Robin Cook and Hubert Védrine. On 23 February 1999, the co-chairs put out a statement saying that the negotiations "have led to a consensus" on substantial autonomy for Kosovo, including on mechanisms for free and fair elections to democratic institutions, for the governance of Kosovo, for the protection of human rights and the rights of members of national communities; and for the establishment of a fair judicial system". They went on to say that "a political framework is now in place" leaving the further work of finalizing "the implementation Chapters of the Agreement, including the modalities of the invited international civilian and military presence in Kosovo". However, this assessment was at best overly optimistic, and at worst absolutely ignored the divergence of interests between the two major parties. The Albanians were unwilling to accept a solution that would retain Kosovo as part of Serbia, while the Serbs did not want to see the pre-1990 status quo restored, and they were implacably opposed to any international role in the governance of the province, including the offer of a face-saving measure wherein blue-helmeted UN peacekeeping troops would be used instead of NATO troops. To add to the problem, the NATO Contact Group countries were desperate to avoid having to make good on their threat of force—Greece and Italy were opposed to the idea. Consequently, when the talks failed to achieve an agreement by the original deadline of 19 February, they were extended by another month.

=== Paris ===
Talks resumed on 15 March 1999 at the Kleber Center in Paris. On 18 March 1999, the Kosovo Albanian, American and British delegation signed the Rambouillet Agreement while the Serbian and Russian delegations refused. The agreement called for self-governance of Kosovo as an autonomous region within the Federal Republic of Yugoslavia; a NATO-led force of 30,000 troops to maintain order in Kosovo; an unhindered right of passage for NATO troops on Yugoslav territory, including Kosovo; and immunity for NATO and its agents to Yugoslav law. In addition, NATO forces would have the right to use local roads, ports, railways, and airports without payment of duties, dues, tolls or charges, as well as the right to use the electromagnetic spectrum without payment. NATO would also have the right to requisition public facilities for its use free of cost. NATO forces would have the right to hire local personnel who upon employment with NATO would be exempt from local laws in respect to acts performed in their official capacity, national service obligations, local labor laws, and taxes on their salaries. Local infrastructure would be subjected to improvements or modifications to by NATO forces when deemed necessary to facilitate the mission. According to Tim Judah, the Serbian side used Annex B only later on as a reason for the failure of talks; at the time, the Serbs rejected any discussion of the involvement of foreign troops, let alone the extensive rights that would have been afforded them by Annex B.

=== Signing ===
The agreement was signed by Ibrahim Rugova, Hashim Thaçi, Rexhep Qosja and Veton Surroi on behalf of "Kosovo" in the presence of Christopher Hill and Wolfgang Petritsch on 18 March 1999. The delegation of the Federal Republic of Yugoslavia and the Republic of Serbia refused to sign the agreement.

=== Aftermath ===
Events proceeded rapidly after the failure at Rambouillet. The international monitors from the OSCE were withdrawn on 22 March for fear of the monitors' safety ahead of the anticipated bombing by NATO. On 23 March, the Serbian assembly issued a resolution that condemned the withdrawal of the OSCE monitors, and accepted the principle of "self rule" for Kosovo and non-military part of the agreement. The NATO bombing campaign against the Federal Republic of Yugoslavia commenced on 24 March 1999.

NATO leaders had expected that a brief bombing campaign would lead to Serb forces withdrawing from Kosovo, hence ending the humanitarian crisis; but Milošević may have gambled that his government and armed forces could withstand a few days of bombing without serious harm.

== Reactions ==
In commentary released to the press, former United States Secretary of State Henry Kissinger declared that:

The Rambouillet text, which called on Serbia to admit NATO troops throughout Yugoslavia, was a provocation, an excuse to start bombing. Rambouillet is not a document that an angelic Serb could have accepted. It was a terrible diplomatic document that should never have been presented in that form.

— Henry Kissinger, The Daily Telegraph, 28 June 1999

The historian Christopher Clark supports this view, asserting that the terms of the 1914 Austro-Hungarian ultimatum to Serbia appear lenient compared to the NATO demands.

A former hand on the State Department's Yugoslavia desk, George Kenney, reported in May 1999 that a senior State Department official had briefed journalists off the record that "[we] deliberately set the bar higher than the Serbs could accept".

For the Serbs, signing the Rambouillet agreement would actually have been signing away all Serbian sovereignty over Kosovo. It was not even a "take it or leave it" proposition, as Secretary of State Albright emphasized back in February 1999; rather, it was "sign it or get bombed." There were, in fact, no negotiations at all, and no sovereign, independent state would have signed the Rambouillet agreement.

Historian Noel Malcolm wrote that as the Kosovo Albanian delegation signed the agreement on the 18th, the Yugoslav delegation boycotted the ceremony and declared its opposition to the plan and that military maneuvers were being planned, so that by March 20 there were more than 26,000 Serbian troops inside the province and another 15,000 stationed just beyond its eastern border.

== See also ==
- Kosovo Verification Mission
- Clark-Naumann agreement
- 1999 NATO bombing of Yugoslavia
- Kumanovo Agreement
- Ahtisaari Plan
