= William G. Walker =

American diplomat (born 1935)

William Walker
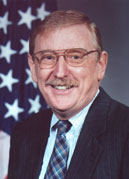

United States Ambassador to El Salvador
- In office August 30, 1988 – February 21, 1992
- President: Ronald Reagan
- Preceded by: Edwin G. Corr
- Succeeded by: Alan H. Flanigan

Personal details
- Born: June 1, 1935 (age 91) Kearny, New Jersey, U.S.
- Party: Democratic Party
- Children: 4
- Education: University of Southern California, University of California, Los Angeles (BA, MA)
- Occupation: Foreign Service Officer, Diplomat

William Graham Walker (born June 1, 1935) is a United States Foreign Service diplomat who served as the US ambassador to El Salvador and as the head of the controversial Kosovo Verification Mission.

== Political career ==
Walker was born in Kearny, New Jersey, and moved with his family to Santa Monica, California in his junior high school years. He later attended Santa Monica High School. He studied architecture at the University of Southern California, until joining the United States Army for two years, after which he enrolled at the University of California, Los Angeles (UCLA) to finish his undergraduate work, majoring in political science. He received an M.A. in Latin American Studies from UCLA in 1969. Walker joined the Foreign Service in 1961.

As a Foreign Service officer, he has served mostly in Latin America, notably in Bolivia, Brazil, El Salvador, Honduras, Peru, Domestically, he has served on the Argentina desk at the US State Department, and with the Environmental Protection Agency in San Francisco. He was a Foreign Service Inspector in the Office of the Inspector General from 1978 to 1980 and State Department Fellow at the Council on Foreign Relations in New York City from 1977 to 1988.

From 1985 to 1988, he served as Deputy Assistant Secretary of State in the Bureau of Inter-American Affairs, with responsibility for relations with Central America and Panama. By coincidence, he shares his name with a historical soldier of fortune who in the 19th century attempted to conquer parts of Central America (and was ultimately executed). From 1988 to 1992, he served as Ambassador to El Salvador. He was the Vice President of the National Defense University in Washington, D.C. between 1994 and 1997.

=== Role in the Balkans ===
In August 1997, Walker was named as a Special Representative of the Secretary General and was appointed to head the United Nations Transitional Administration for Eastern Slavonia, Baranja and Western Sirmium (UNTAES). He led a mission consisting of some 800 UN civilian and 2,500 military peacekeepers and administrators. The mission was responsible for overseeing the peaceful reintegration of this Serb-controlled region of eastern Slavonia into Croatia following the end of the Croatian War.

Walker was subsequently appointed to head the Kosovo Verification Mission, leading some 1400 international and 1500 local staff between October 1998 and June 1999 along with British Major General John Drewienkiewicz, Walker's military adviser. This was a peacekeeping mission mounted by the Organization for Security and Cooperation in Europe in an attempt to halt the ongoing violence in Kosovo by verifying compliance on the part of Yugoslav forces with U.N. resolutions.

Following the alleged Račak massacre of 45 Kosovar Albanians in January 1999, Walker visited the site and called it an "unspeakable atrocity" and "crime very much against humanity." On January 18, 1999, the FR Yugoslavia government accused him of "going far beyond his mandate", and of "waging a campaign of disinformation against Serbia", declaring him persona non grata and ordering him to leave the country. A week later, on the intervention by European Council and Russian Federation, Prime Minister of FR Yugoslavia Momir Bulatović froze the decision. The Račak massacre was a pivotal incident in pushing NATO into launching its bombing campaign against Yugoslavia. The OSCE mission was discontinued following the end of the Kosovo War in June 1999. In a 2008 interview, Helena Ranta, the Finnish pathologist who was tasked with examining the Račak massacre, accused Walker of pressuring her into proclaiming that Serbian security forces were responsible for the massacre in her report, despite it not being a part of her job.

On November 24, 2008, he became honorary citizen of Republic of Albania, the title given by President Bamir Topi. On January 15, 2009, on the 10th anniversary of the Reçak massacre, he was awarded the Golden Medal of Freedom by the President and Prime Minister of the Republic of Kosovo. In January 2017 a statue of Walker was erected in the village of Reçak.

During the 2010 Kosovo elections Walker supported and campaigned for then Albanian nationalist and radical Albin Kurti. Walker has repeatedly criticized former Kosovo President Hashim Thaçi and accused him of corruption. In 2020 Walker was hired as a consultant for Thaci. The five month agreement was signed by Thaci and the Walker Foundation, an association set up by Walker.

In January 2023, President of Albania Bajram Begaj granted Walker one of the nation's highest awards, the Knight of the Order of the Flag.

Walker was awarded with Doctor Honoris Causa price, in Universiteti Haxhi Zeka in Pejë.

== Personal life ==
Walker is married and has four children. He is fluent in Spanish and Portuguese.

Diplomatic posts
Preceded by Edwin G. Corr	United States Ambassador to El Salvador; 30 August 1988 – 21 February 1992	Succeeded by Peter F. Romero; Chargé d'affaires ad interim
