= Biljana Kovačević-Vučo =

Serbian activist (1952-2010)

Biljana Kovačević-Vučo Биљана Ковачевић-Вучо
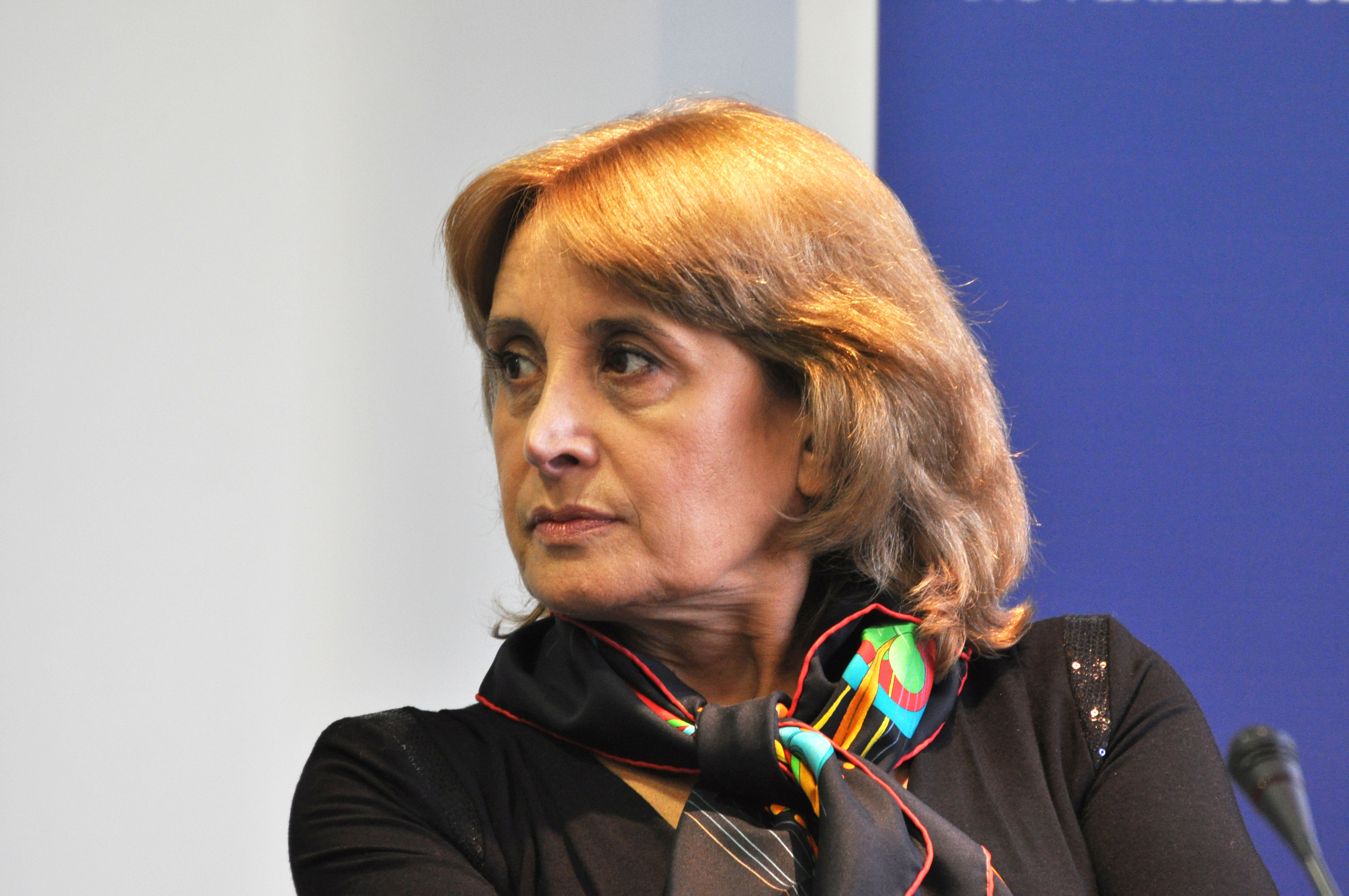
- Born: May 21, 1952; Belgrade, Yugoslavia
- Died: April 20, 2010 (aged 57); Belgrade, Serbia
- Education: University of Belgrade
- Occupations: Human rights activist; anti-war activist
- Organization: YUCOM (1997–2010)
- Parent: Veljko Kovačević

Biljana Kovačević-Vučo (Serbo-Croatian Cyrillic: Биљана Ковачевић-Вучо; May 21, 1952 – April 20, 2010) was a Serbian human rights and anti-war activist. She was President of the Lawyer's Committee for Human Rights (YUCOM) from 1997 until her death in 2010. A lifelong antifascist, antinationalist and progressive, she was also a member of the Advisory Board of the left-wing magazine Novi Plamen

== Biography ==
Born in Belgrade in 1952, Biljana was raised in a household with two sisters, Nada and Jelena. Their Montenegrin father Veljko Kovačević—a Yugoslav volunteer veteran of the Spanish Civil War and Partisan communist guerrilla resistance fighter following Nazi German invasion of the Yugoslav Kingdom, a military engagement for which he received Order of the People's Hero gallantry medal—had relocated to Belgrade several years before Biljana's birth due to being appointed to a series of senior military and government posts in the newly established Federal People's Republic of Yugoslavia. He simultaneously enrolled at the Higher Military Academy in Belgrade, advancing to the rank of general-lieutenant in the Yugoslav People's Army (JNA), while also establishing a new career as a novelist. Biljana's Italian-Croatian mother Ines Valo from Istria tended to the family as young Biljana completed her education in Skopje and Belgrade.

In 1977 she graduated from the University of Belgrade Faculty of Law.
