= United Nations Security Council Resolution 1199 =

United Nations Security Council resolution

UN Security Council Resolution 1199
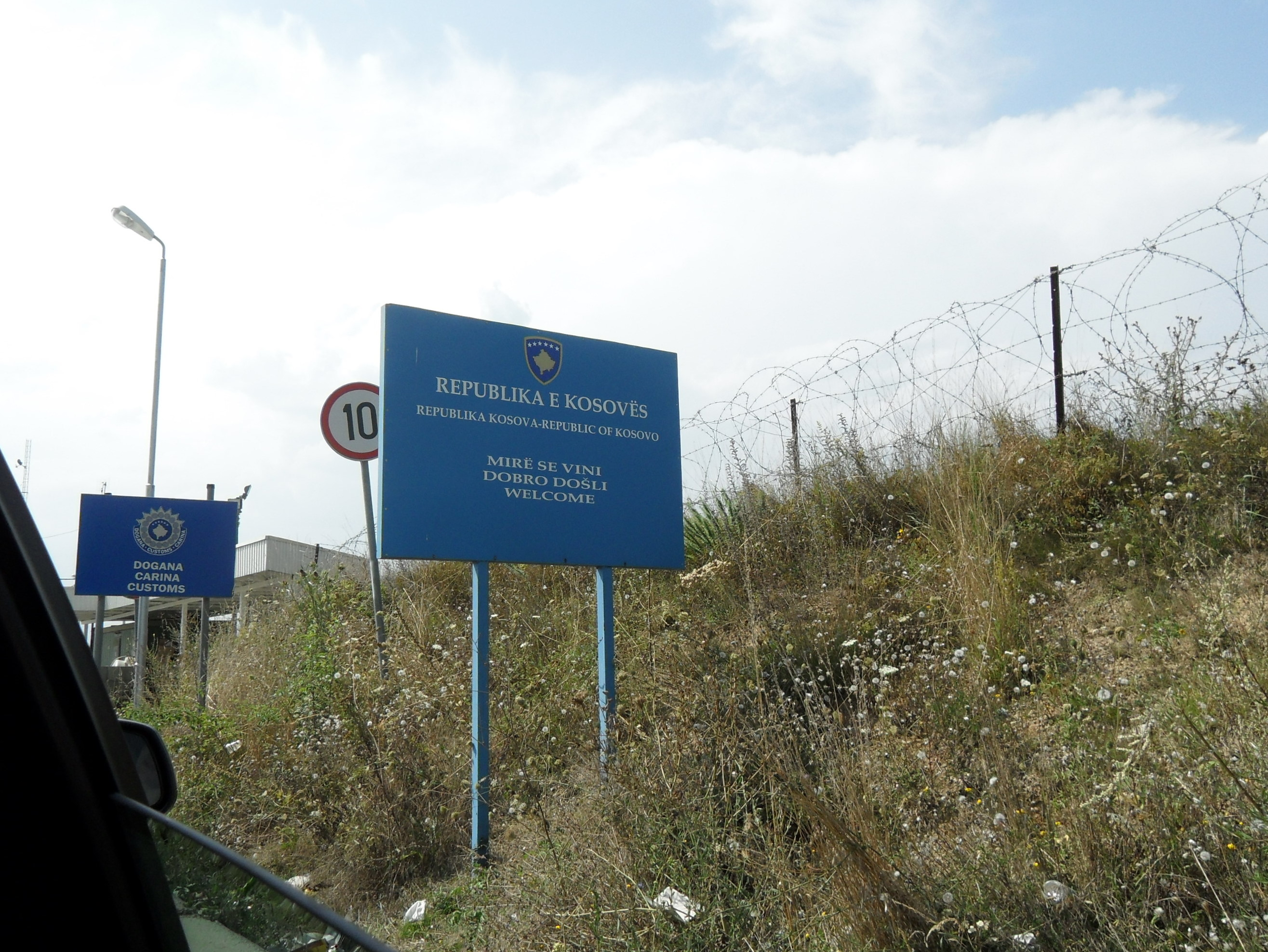
- Kosovo-Serbia border
- Date: 23 September 1998
- Meeting no.: 3,930
- Code: S/RES/1199 (Document)
- Subject: The situation in Kosovo (FRY)
- Voting summary: 14 voted for; None voted against; 1 abstained
- Result: Adopted

Security Council composition
- Permanent members: China; France; Russia; United Kingdom; United States
- Non-permanent members: Bahrain; Brazil; Costa Rica; Gabon; Gambia; Japan; Kenya; Portugal; Slovenia; Sweden

United Nations Security Council resolution 1199, adopted on 23 September 1998, after recalling Resolution 1160 (1998), the Council demanded that the Albanian and Yugoslav parties in Kosovo end hostilities and observe a ceasefire.

== Background ==
The Security Council convened to discuss the fighting in Kosovo and in particular the indiscriminate use of force by the Serbian security forces and Yugoslav Army, which resulted in the displacement of 230,000 according to the Secretary-General Kofi Annan. The refugees had fled to northern Albania, Bosnia and Herzegovina and other European countries and the United Nations High Commissioner for Refugees (UNHCR) had estimated that 50,000 were without basic amenities. It reaffirmed the right of all refugees to return and noted that there was a humanitarian catastrophe unfolding in Kosovo and violations of human rights and international humanitarian law. At the same time, acts of violence by any party were condemned and acts of terrorism to further goals, and the Council reaffirmed that the status of Kosovo should include autonomy and self-administration.

== Proposal ==
Acting under Chapter VII of the United Nations Charter, the resolution demanded that all parties cease hostilities and maintain a ceasefire. Both the FR Yugoslavian government and the Kosovo Albanian leadership were urged to take immediate steps to improve the humanitarian situation and begin talks to resolve the crisis. The Council then demanded that the Federal Republic of Yugoslavia:

(a) end action by security forces that affected the civilian population;
(b) allow the presence of international monitors and guarantee their freedom of movement;
(c) facilitate the return of refugees with the UNHCR and International Committee of the Red Cross and allow humanitarian aid to reach Kosovo;
(d) make rapid progress towards finding a political solution to the situation in Kosovo.

It noted a commitment made by Serbian President Slobodan Milošević to use political means to solve the conflict, avoid repressive actions against the civilian population, guarantee freedom of movement for international humanitarian organisations and observers and to ensure the safe return of refugees. Meanwhile, the Albanian leadership in Kosovo had to condemn terrorism.

The council welcomed the establishment of the Kosovo Diplomatic Observer Mission and urged states and organisations represented in the Federal Republic of Yugoslavia to carry out continuous monitoring of the situation in Kosovo. The Federal Republic of Yugoslavia was reminded that it was responsible for the safety of diplomatic, international and non-governmental humanitarian personnel. Both parties were called upon to co-operate with the International Criminal Tribunal for the former Yugoslavia (ICTY) for possible violations and for the need to bring those responsible for the mistreatment of civilians and deliberate destruction of property to justice.

Finally, the secretary-general was requested to report regularly to the council on developments in the region and stated that if the current resolution was not complied with, further measures would be taken to restore peace and security.

== Vote ==
Resolution 1199 was approved by 14 members of the council. China abstained from the vote, citing that the conflict was an internal matter for the Federal Republic of Yugoslavia and it was acting within its rights.

== See also ==
- Kosovo War
- List of United Nations Security Council Resolutions 1101 to 1200 (1997–1998)
- Yugoslav Wars
- List of United Nations Security Council Resolutions related to the conflicts in former Yugoslavia
