= Timeline of the Kosovo War =

Timeline of the Kosovo War. Abbreviations:

Combatants

- KLA—Kosovo Liberation Army
- FARK—Armed Forces of the Republic of Kosovo
- VJ—Yugoslav Army
- NATO—North Atlantic Treaty Organization

Peace-keeping forces

- KFOR—Kosovo Force (NATO)

Organizations

- ICTY—International Criminal Tribunal for the former Yugoslavia (UN)
- OSCE—Organization for Security and Co-operation in Europe
- KVM—Kosovo Verification Mission
- IICK—Independent International Commission on Kosovo
- KDOM—Kosovo Diplomatic Observer Mission

== Background ==
=== 1981-1989 ===
Date	Event
11 March 1981	1981 protests in Kosovo: Student protest starts at the University of Pristina
1 April 1981	Between 5,000 and 25,000 demonstrators of Albanian nationality call for SAP Kosovo to become a constituent republic inside Yugoslavia, as opposed to an autonomous province of Serbia.
2 April 1981	Presidency sends special forces to stop the demonstrations and declares a state of emergency in regards to Kosovo. State of emergency lasts 7 days.
3 April 1981	End of demonstrations during which 9 people are killed and more than 250 injured.
1 May 1985	Đorđe Martinović incident
3 September 1987	Paraćin massacre

=== 1991-1992 ===
Date	Event
26-30 September 1991	Kosovo independence referendum where 99.98% of voters voted in favor of independence, with a turnout of 87.01%.
1991 (exact date unknown)	Croatian President Franjo Tuđman urges Kosovar Albanians to open a new front against FR Yugoslavia and forms a Croatian Army unit composed of 400 Albanian soldiers which were supposed to be sent to Kosovo. However, after negotiations with Bujar Bukoshi fell through, the Ethnic-Albanian unit was dispatched in October and reincorporated into Croatia.
30 December 1991	Siege of Prekaz. Yugoslav police besiege the Jashari compound but are forced to retreat from Prekaz.

=== 1993-early 1998 ===
Date	Event
22 May 1993	Glogovac attack. KLA victory. 4-5 Yugoslav officers killed and 2 injured.
16 February 1995	A Yugoslav policeman goes on a shooting spree, killing an Albanian.
20 June 1995	A nine-year old Albanian boy is shot dead by Yugoslav soldiers after approaching barracks to retrieve his goat.
21 April 1996	Kosovo Albanian student Armend Daci was shot by an ethnic Serb civilian sniper in Sunny Hill, Prishtina.
25 April 1996	3 KLA members shoot in Restaurant Çakor in Deçan and kill three people.
16 June 1996	Yugoslav policeman Goran Mitrović was seriously injured in an attack on a police patrol near Podujevo by the KLA.
25 October 1996	Surkis ambush. 2 Yugoslav officers killed.
31 January 1997	Pestovë Ambush. Yugoslav police victory. Yugoslav Police kill Zahir Pajaziti.
6 May 1997	Battle of Qafë Prush. Yugoslav victory. Yugoslav forces kill Luan Haradinaj and wound several others.
16 October 1997	Kliçinë Attack. Yugoslav forces kill KLA head of logistics, Adrian Krasniqi.
26-28 November 1997	Battle of Rezalla. KLA establishes control over Drenica.
January 1998	Albanian separatists remove the Yugoslav police presence in Klina.
22 January 1998	First attack on Prekaz. KLA drives out Yugoslav forces out of the village and its vicinity.

== Kosovo War ==
=== 1998 ===
- 28 February: 4 policemen are killed in an ambush by the KLA in the village of Likoshan.
- 28 February: Attacks on Likoshane and Çirez. Yugoslav victory
- 28 February: Likoshan killings. Yugoslav police killed 14 Albanians of the Ahmeti family.
- 5 March: 4 Yugoslav policemen killed in an attack on a police station by KLA in Prekaz.
- 5–7 March: Attack on Prekaz. Yugoslav victory. 59 Albanians killed by VJ, including 28 women and young children.
- 24 March: First Battle of Gllogjan. KLA victory.
- 26 March: Ambush near Prekaz. Yugoslav victory. Death of Ilir Lushtaku.
- April: Capture of Junik. KLA victory. First KLA offensive.
- 22 April: Battle of Dashinoc. KLA victory.
- 23 April: Albanian–Yugoslav border clashes. Yugoslav victory. 18 militants killed by VJ.
- 26 April: Attack near Gorozhup. Yugoslav victory, KLA militants flee to Albania.
- 27 April: Operation in Gllogjan. Yugoslav victory, 8 KLA militants killed in police operation.
- May: The KLA shot down a Yugoslav MIG near Prishtina and a Yugoslav military helicopter in Klina.
- 3-6 May: Ponoševac clashes. Inconclusive, KLA withdrawal.
- 7-10 May: First Battle of Lapušnik. KLA victory. Lapušnik prison camp established.
- 9 May: Yugoslav forces kill KLA general Ilir Konushevci and Hazir Mala in an ambush near the Albanian border.
- 12-14 May: Anadrinë offensive. KLA victory. Yugoslav forces retreat from the Anadrinë region.
- 15 May-3 July: Offensive on Kijevo. Yugoslav Victory.
- 15-17 May: Clashes in Iglarevo, inconclusive.
- 25 May: Ambush near Ljubenić. KLA victory. 3 Yugoslav policemen killed. Start of the Ljubenić massacres.
- June 22: Capture of Mališevo. KLA victory.
- June–August: KLA Summer offensive (1998). KLA strategic failure. KLA captures 40% of Kosovo but are soon overrun by Yugoslav offensive. Yugoslav forces retake most towns. 80 Yugoslav policemen are killed, over 70 KLA fighters killed.
- 1-3 June: Dečani operation. Victory for the MUP and the JSO, clearing of most of southwestern Kosovo from KLA units.
- 9 June: Yugoslav operation on Albanian border. Over 250 KLA weapons seized. Yugoslav victory
- 22 June–1 July: Battle of Belaćevac Mine. Yugoslav victory.
- 1 July: Battle of Ade and Dobro Selo. Yugoslav victory, Yugoslav forces regain control over Ade and Dobro Selo.
- 6 July–17 July: First Battle of Lođa. KLA victory.
- 7-16 July: Battle of Vërrin. KLA victory
- 15 July: KLA attack on the Trepça Mine. KLA victory..
- 17–20 July Battle of Orahovac. Yugoslav victory.
- 18 July: Albanian–Yugoslav border clashes. Yugoslav victory.
- 19 July: KLA attacks on villages around Orahovac. KLA victory.
- 19 July: Yugoslav-Albanian Border shelling. 30 militants killed. Yugoslav Victory
- 24 July: Unblocking of the Peć-Priština road. Yugoslav victory and KLA withdrawal.
- 25—26 July: Second Battle of Llapushnik. Yugoslav victory. KLA abandonment of the Lapušnik prison camp. 23 of 35 inmates killed by KLA.
- 27 July: Battles of Gornja and Donja Klina. Yugoslav Victory
- 28 July—4 October: Yugoslav counter-offensive in Kosovo (1998). Yugoslav victory. FR Yugoslavia recaptures and established control over most of Kosovo. Ceasefire agreement on 4 October. KLA is weakened.
- 28 July—17 August: Battle of Junik. Yugoslav victory.
- 29 July: Mališevo offensive. Yugoslav victory
- 31 July: Clash near Lipljan. Yugoslav victory, KLA suffers 8 killed and several captured.
- 1 August: Offensive on Josanica. Yugoslav victory, Yugoslav forces drive out KLA from their positions in Josanica, Srbica-Klina road opened.
- 2–4 August: August Yugoslav offensive in Drenica. Yugoslav victory, thousands of Kosovo Albanian civilians were driven into the hills.
- 3 August: Offensive in Klina. Yugoslav victory, 9 villages reclaimed under Yugoslav control
- 1-30 August: Drenica attacks. KLA victory. 17 Yugoslav soldiers killed by KLA attacks in the Drenica Valley.
- 10 August–17 August: Second Battle of Lođa. Yugoslav victory.
- 9-12 August: Clashes in Rznic and Babaloć. Yugoslav Victory.
- 11–12 August: Second Battle of Glodjane Yugoslav victory.
- 15 August: Operation Eagle (Kosovo War). KLA victory. 6 Yugoslav troops killed in an ambush.
- 22-25 August: Battle of Kleçka. Yugoslav victory. Yugoslav forces capture Kleçka and Luzhnica. 5-6 KLA militants killed. KLA general Ismet Jashari is killed.
- 26 August: Battle of Gunovc and Komorec. KLA victory, 8 Yugoslav soldiers killed by the KLA.
- September: Yugoslav September Offensive. Yugoslav victory.
- 1 September: Incident in Lez. 16 Militants killed. Serbian police victory.
- 1–5 September: Yugoslav offensive in Prizren. Yugoslav victory.
- 2-4 September: Attacks on Astrozub. KLA forced to surrender after the village is encircled. It is later retaken by KLA.
- 9 September: Lake Radonjić massacre.
- September: Lake Radonjić Operation. MUP and JSO victory. Yugoslav troops capture Lake Radonjić.
- 11 September: Attack on Rezalla. KLA victory. Heavy Yugoslav shelling leads to the death of several Albanian civilians.
- 13 September: Capture of Likovac. Yugoslav victory
- 19 September: Seven Serbian policemen were killed in Drenica in a KLA attack against a police station. Start of the Central Drenica offensive.
- 22-26 September: Central Drenica offensive. Yugoslav victory despite heavy casualties. 6 villages captured by Yugoslav forces. Start of the Gornje Obrinje massacre.
- 25 September: Attack on the Likovac-Gornje Obrinje Road. KLA victory. 5 Yugoslav police officers killed.
- 30 September: Operation Fenix. KLA victory.
- 26-29 September: Gornje Obrinje massacre.
- 8 October: KLA general Abedin Rexha is assassinated near Skenderaj by Gani Geci.
- 15 October: Holbrooke-Milošević Agreement. Ceasefire in Kosovo starts after an agreement between Richard Holbrooke and Slobodan Milošević for a temporary Yugoslav withdrawal. Yugoslav withdrawal commenced on 25 October. KLA reestablishes control over Albanian majority villages with no Yugoslav presence. Ceasefire broken in early December after an ambush on the Albanian-Yugoslav border.
- 11 November: KLA returns to Malisheva.
- 3 December: Albanian–Yugoslav border clash. Yugoslav victory.
- 14 December: Albanian–Yugoslav border clashes. Yugoslav victory.
- 14 December: Panda Bar massacre.
- 19 December: Zvonko Bojanić, the Serb mayor of the town of Kosovo Polje is assassinated by the KLA.
- 23–27 December: Battle of Podujevo. Yugoslav victory.

=== 1999 ===
- 8 January: Ambush near Suva Reka. In an ambush by the KLA near Dulje, 4 police officers were killed and 1 wounded.
- 8 January: Ambush near Kosovska Mitrovica. Three VJ soldiers are killed eight VJ soldiers are captured.
- 15 January: Račak Massacre
- 19 January: Clashes in Račak. Assistant commander of Štimlje OUP along with two policemen are killed.
- 20 January: Skirmishes near Kosovska Mitrovica. Yugoslav victory.
- 27 January: Yugoslav forces return a strong presence in Glogovac, Lapušnik, and Kijevo, they also remained heavily deployed in Račak.
- 27–29 January: Start of the Rogovo massacre.
- 22-27 February: Battle of Vučitrn. Yugoslav victory. Yugoslav army overran KLA positions, KLA forced to withdraw.
- 28 February: Kačanik ambush, the Kačanik police commander is killed and four others wounded by the KLA.
- 1 March: Clashes in Orahovac. Yugoslav victory. Civilians flee the area.
- 11 March: Battle of Ješkovo, Yugoslav victory.
- 14 March: Duš and Svrhe operation, Yugoslav victory. Four KLA members killed.
- 15-16 March: Fighting in Podujevo; burning reported in the villages of Oshlane and Pantin.
- 17 March: Yugoslav operation in Kabash. Yugoslav victory. Yugoslav forces capture Kabash and KLA stronghold.
- 19 March: Attacks on the Police stations in Drenas, Skenderaj and Lluzhan. KLA victory. Start of a Yugoslav offensive in the regions of Drenica and Llap.
- 20-23 March: Offensive in Llap. Yugoslav victory. Prishtina-Podujevo road re-opened. 9 KLA militants killed.
- 20-21 March: Yugoslav offensive on Skenderaj. Inconclusive. 10 civilians executed.
- 20-31 March: Yugoslav spring offensive in Kosovo. Yugoslav victory. Capture of dozen of villages and territories in Srbica and Glogovac municipalities, establishment of Yugoslav control over the area and crimes against Albanian population. Yugoslav forces temporary withdrew allowing KLA to retain its presence in area.
- 23 March: Battle of Pasoma. Yugoslav victory.
- 24 March-11 June: NATO bombing of Yugoslavia, codenamed Operation Allied Force.
- 24 March-11 June: Operation Echo.
- 24 March-9 June: Bombing of Novi Sad.
- March–June: Drenica massacres.
- 24 March-15 May: Second Battle of Rezalla. KLA victory.
- 24 March: Prapashticë ambush. Yugoslav victory. Yugoslav forces kill Ismet Asllani.
- 25 March: Aircraft chase from Batajnica. NATO victory. 2 Yugoslav MiG-29's chase a NATO aircraft from Batajnica but are then attacked by 2 NATO F-15. Both MiG-29's are shotdown
- 25 March: Bela Crkva massacre.
- 26 March: Suva Reka massacre.
- 25-28 March: Velika Kruša massacre
- 27 March: F-117A shootdown by Yugoslav air force.
- 28 March: Izbica massacre.
- 30 March: Fighting in Negroc. Inconclusive. Civilians flee to the surrounding villages of Vuçak and Tërdec.
- March: First Battle of Pastasellë. KLA victory. Start of the Pastasel massacre.
- 31 March: Pastasel massacre
- 31 March: Incident near Yugoslav–Macedonian border. 3 US soldiers captured.
- 6 April: Crmljanska Suka offensive. Yugoslav victory. Yugoslav forces capture Crmljanska Suka, Jablanica and Kraljane.
- 7 April: Second Battle of Pastasellë. Yugoslav victory.
- 8 April: Radovac ambush. KLA victory, paramilitary commander Vidomir Šalipur is killed.
- 9 April-10 June 1999: Battle of Košare.
- 12 April: Grdelica train bombing.
- 13 April: Albania–Yugoslav border incident. Status quo ante bellum. Albanian Army retakes control.
- 14 April: NATO bombing of Albanian refugees near Gjakova.
- 16 April: Battle of Mazniku. Yugoslav victory. Death of Shkëlzen Haradinaj.
- 17 April: Poklek massacre
- 21 April: Meja ambush. KLA victory. 6 policemen killed near Meja. Start of the Meja massacre.
- 23 April: NATO bombing of the Radio Television of Serbia headquarters.
- 27-28 April: Meja massacre.
- April: Zllash torture. 6 civilians tortured and 1 civilian killed by KLA.
- 30 April: Battle of Shtuticë. Yugoslav victory. Death of Ilaz Kodra.
- May: Operations in Llap. Yugoslav victory.
- 1 May: Fighting near Vučitrn. KLA victory. 2 Yugoslav police officers killed. Civilians flee from Vučitrn. Start of the Vučitrn massacre.
- 1 May: Lužane bus bombing.
- 2-3 May: Vučitrn massacre.
- 4 May: Incident in Nakučan. Yugoslav victory.
- 7 May: United States bombing of the Chinese embassy in Belgrade.
- 7-12 May: Cluster bombing of Niš.
- 13 May: Koriša bombing.
- 14 May: Ćuška massacre.
- 18 May: Graštica Ambushes. KLA victory. 8-10 VJ soldiers killed.
- 19-23 May: Dubrava Prison bombings and executions. 19-23 civilians killed by bombings and 79-82 civilians were executed
- 25 May: Thousands of anti-war protesters rally in southern and central Serbia, calling for the withdrawal of conscript troops from the conflict zone. Despite efforts by two high-ranking Yugoslav army generals to ease tensions, around 2,000 people gather outside the municipal hall in Krusevac to oppose a regional call-up. Similar protests take place in Aleksandrovac and Raska.
- 26-29 May: Tusuz massacre. Serbian police kills 27 Albanian civilians.
- 26 May-10 June: Battle of Pashtrik. KLA–NATO strategic failure and end of war in Yugoslav military victory. KLA captures Mount Pashtrik but fails to reach its main objective.
- 30 May: Varvarin bridge bombing. 10 Serbian civilians killed. 17 injured.
- 30 May: Ambush near Orlat, Yugoslav victory. Death of Rasim Kiçina.
- 2 June: Belanici offensive. Yugoslav victory. Yugoslav forces and volunteers attacked KLA stronghold in Belanica, where after days of fighting managed to defeat the KLA and capture the stronghold.
- 9 June: Kumanovo Agreement. End of the Kosovo War.

== Aftermath ==
=== 1999 ===
- 10 June: Following the NATO bombing and end of the war, Yugoslav forces withdraw from Kosovo.
- 11 June: Following the end of the war and departure of Yugoslav forces, KLA takes control of Prizren.
- 1999: Operation Kinetic (1999). 1400 Canadian troops deployed in Kosovo.
- June–October: Gnjilane killings. 51 Serbian civilians are killed by the KLA Gjilan group.
- 12 June: Incident at Pristina airport. After a tense standoff an agreement is made between NATO and Russia as the incident ends peacefully.
- 12 June: Peja killings. 7 Albanian civilians are killed by Serbian forces.
- 12 June: Start of the Insurgency in the Preševo Valley
- 13 June: Prizren incident (1999). KFOR victory. 2 Yugoslav army stragglers killed. KFOR troops secure Prizren.
- 20 June: KLA agrees to disband its forces after a meeting with NATO.
- 23 June: Zhegër Incident (1999). American/KFOR victory. KFOR troops secure Zhegër. 3 serbian militants killed.
- July: Ugljare mass grave. 15 Serbian civilians killed.
- 23 July: Staro Gracko massacre. 14 Serbian farmers killed.
- 6 September: Ranilug incident. In an incident near the village of Ranilug, a Russian KFOR patrol shoots and kills 3 Serbian gunmen who attacked a carload of ethnic Albanians.
- 5 October: Albanians clash with armed Serb civilians and Russian and French KFOR in Mitrovica. 10 Albanians, 10 French, 6 Russians wounded and 1 Russian Tank destroyed. 3 Serbs killed and several injured.

=== 2000 ===
- 16 February: Start of the 2000 unrest in Kosovo.
- 26 February: A prominent serb medical doctor was murdered in Gnjilane.
- 29 February: A Russian KFOR soldier was killed in Srbica.
- February: A UN bus transporting Serb refugees in Mitrovica was hit by an anti-tank missile, and a grenade was thrown into a Serb café the same month, resulting in rioting by Serb civilians. 8 people killed.
- February: A Yugoslav police officer and physician were killed, and 3 officers and a physician were wounded in Kosovska Mitrovica.
- 15 March: FRY file a complain after 16 serbian civilians were injured by grenade attacks in North Mitrovica.
- 6 June: A grenade is thrown at a crowd of Serbians waiting for the bus in Gračanica. 3 civilians were injured.
- 6 June: End of the 2000 unrest in Kosovo.
- 28 October: 2000 Kosovan local elections.

=== 2001 ===
- 22 January: 2001 insurgency in Macedonia. Ohrid Agreement
- 16 February: Podujevo bus bombing. 12 Serbian civilians killed by Albanians.
- 1 June: End of the Insurgency in the Preševo Valley. Yugoslav victory.
- 17 November: 2001 Kosovan parliamentary election. Ibrahim Rugova is elected.

== Sources ==
- Drecun, Milovan (2004). Drugi kosovski boj. M. Drecun, 2004. ISBN 9788684771096.
