= Albanian-Yugoslav border conflict =

The Albanian-Yugoslav border conflict might refer to:

- 1920–1921
  - Koplik War
  - Albanian-Yugoslav border war (1921)
- 1948–1954
  - Albanian-Yugoslav border conflict (1948-1954)
- 1998
  - April 23, 1998, Albanian–Yugoslav border ambush
  - July 18, 1998, Albanian–Yugoslav border clashes
  - Opljaz clashes
  - Operation in Gjeravica
  - Operation Fenix
  - December 3, 1998, Albanian–Yugoslav border clash
  - December 14, 1998, Albanian–Yugoslav border ambush
- 1999
  - Albania–Yugoslav border incident (April 1999)
  - Battle of Košare
  - Battle of Paštrik
