= List of incidents and peacekeeping operations involving the Kosovo Force =

This is a list of incidents and peacekeeping operations that KFOR has been involved in.

KFOR victory
KFOR defeat
Another result (e.g. a treaty or peace without a clear result, status quo ante bellum, result of civil war or internal conflict, result unknown, mixed results, stalemate, ceasefire or indecisive)
Ongoing conflict

== List ==
Conflict	Combatant 1	Combatant 2	Combatant 3	Result
Incident at Pristina Airport	Kosovo Force (United Kingdom) British Army (United States) US Army (Norway) Norwegian Army	(Russia) Russian Army	(Socialist Federal Republic of Yugoslavia) Yugoslav Army	NATO-Russia agreement: Russian peacekeeping troops deployed in Kosovo
Prizren incident (1999)	Kosovo Force (Germany) German Army	(Serbia and Montenegro) Yugoslav Army stragglers	none	KFOR victory: KFOR troops secure Prizren
Zhegër incident (1999)	Kosovo Force; United States	(Serbia and Montenegro) Serb militants	none	KFOR victory: KFOR troops secure Zhegër
Ranilug incident (1999)	Kosovo Force: Russia	(Serbia) Serbian gunmen	none	KFOR victory: All 3 gunmen are killed
Insurgency in the Preševo Valley (1999–2001)	Liberation Army of Preševo, Medveđa and Bujanovac	FR Yugoslavia KFOR	none	Victory: Končulj Agreement; Yugoslavia retakes the buffer zone; UÇPMB disbanded; Amnesty for UÇPMB members; Low intensity skirmishes continue
2000 unrest in Kosovo	Kosovar Albanians	Kosovar Serbs	KFOR (United Nations) UNMIK	KFOR is able to stop further hostilities: 7 Albanians killed and 15 Serbs killed
North Kosovo crisis (2011–2013)	Kosovo: Kosovo Police; Kosovo Security Force; NATO: Kosovo Force	Kosovo Serbs Supported by: Serbia	none	2012 North Kosovo referendum; Brussels Agreement (2013): 3 Serbs killed and 162 non-fatally injured; 1 Kosovar policeman killed and 7 non-fatally injured; 65 KFOR soldiers non-fatally injured
North Kosovo crisis (2022–2024)	Kosovo Force; EULEX	Kosovo Police; Kosovo Special Forces	Serb List; PKS; Supported by: Serbia; Diplomatic support: Republika Srpska; Russia; China; Hungary	Ongoing: Kosovo Serbs withdraw from Kosovo government institutions; Kosovo Serbs barricade roads from 10 to 30 December 2022; Serbian boycott of local elections; ethnic Albanian mayors elected in all four North Kosovo municipalities in April 2023; Kosovo takes control of the Serb-controlled municipal offices by force, causing a civil disturbance; Kosovo bans imports from Serbia on 14 June after 3 police officers are captured by Serbian forces; 30 Serb paramilitary members enter Kosovo on 24 September, killing 1 officer and injuring 2 others; Kosovo Serbs convert their licence plates to Kosovar ones in November and December 2023; ending the issuance of Serbian licence plates in Kosovo; Mutual recognition of all licence plates as of January 2024; ending of the Serbian sticker regime established after the previous crisis
