= Battle of Glođane =

1998 battle

- Part of the Kosovo War
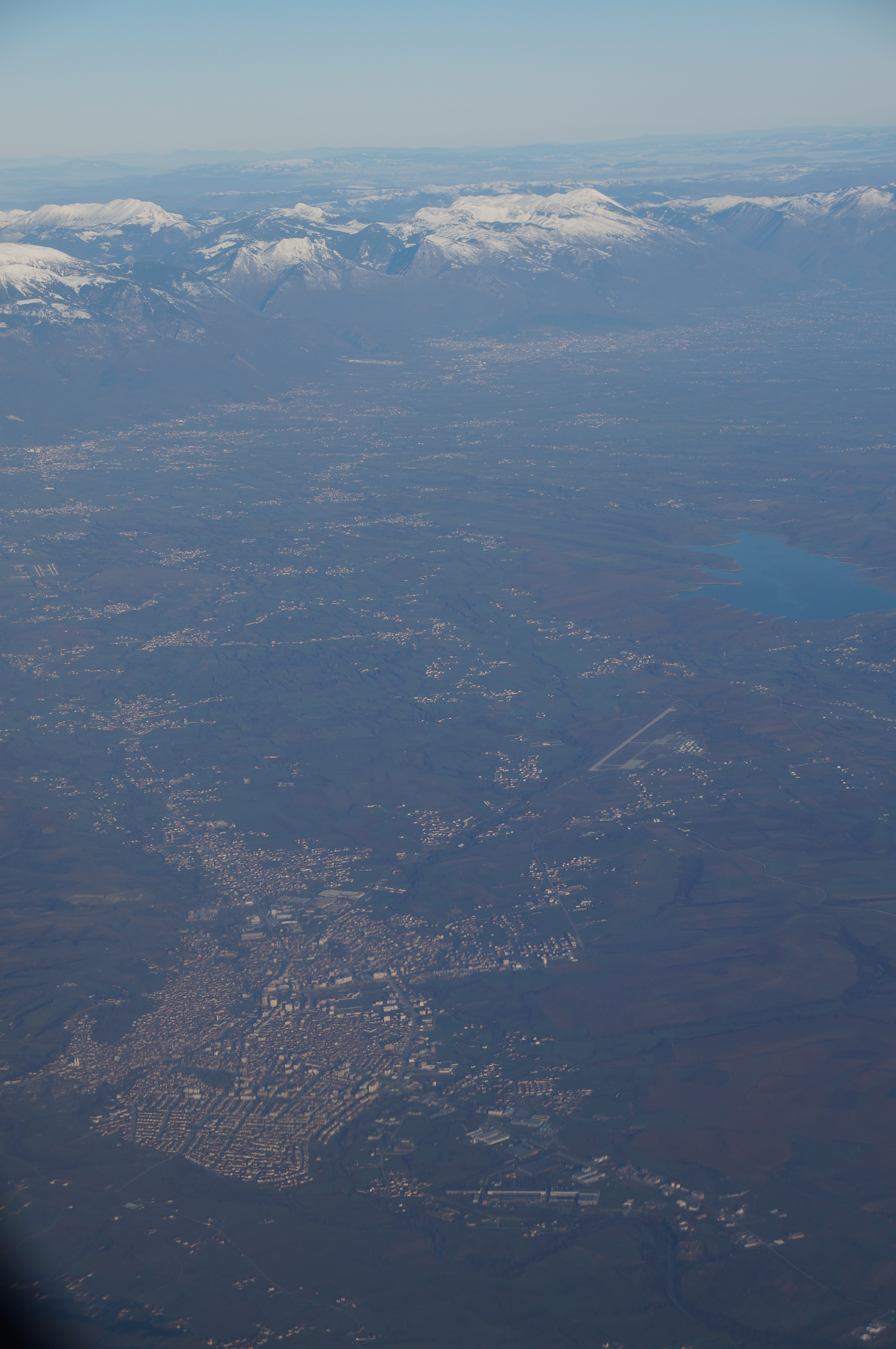
Date	First phase: 24 March 1998; Second phase: 11–12 August 1998
Location	Glođane, near Djakovica, FR Yugoslavia (modern Kosovo)
Result	First battle: KLA victory Second battle: Yugoslav victory: Yugoslav forces capture Glođane; Returned KLA presence

Belligerents
Yugoslavia	Kosovo Liberation Army

Commanders and leaders
(Federal Republic of Yugoslavia) Sreten Lukić (Federal Republic of Yugoslavia) Božidar Delić	Ramush Haradinaj (WIA); Bekim Berisha; Xhezair Shaqiri; Bedri Shala †; Agron Rama

Units involved
(Federal Republic of Yugoslavia) Yugoslav Army; Police of Serbia; Special Operations Unit; Special Anti-Terrorist Unit	Kosovo Liberation Army

Strength
(Federal Republic of Yugoslavia) 500 soldiers and policemen	250 militants

Casualties and losses
(Federal Republic of Yugoslavia) 5 policemen killed (Federal Republic of Yugoslavia) 2 soldiers killed (Federal Republic of Yugoslavia) 10 policemen wounded	7 killed 49 wounded

The Battle of Glođane (Serbian: Битка за Глођане / Bitka za Glođane, Albanian: Beteja e Gllogjanit) was fought during the Kosovo War in the village of Glođane first on 24 March, 1998, and again later on 11 and 12 August 1998, with further clashes occurring in early September. It involved the Kosovo Albanian militant group known as the Kosovo Liberation Army (KLA) and the Yugoslav military and police forces. The clashes signified a sequence of military offensives initiated by the Yugoslav army and police to counter the increasing presence of the Kosovo Liberation Army (KLA) within Kosovo Albanian villages.

== Background ==
In Kosovo, the Kosovo Liberation Army (KLA) forces gained strength and tended to control villages away from the main roads while Yugoslav military forces were positioned on the hills around Lake Radonjić. Throughout the summer of 1998, Yugoslav forces shelled Albanian villages surrounding Lake Radonjić on a daily basis.

== Clashes on 24 March ==
After the Attack on Prekaz and the killings of KLA leaders Adem Jashari and nearly 60 family members, Yugoslav forces planned a similar attack on the village of Glođane, which was home to the Haradinaj clan. On 24 March, 1998, hundreds of Yugoslav forces besieged Glođane. The attack began several hours later, after police forces had monitored the movements of the Haradinaj clan. The Yugoslav forces first attacked the house of the Haradinaj clan and managed to advance to the courtyard, but had to retreat due to heavy resistance. KLA forces began to take up positions in the village and launched a counter-attack on the Yugoslav forces which resulted in a Yugoslav withdrawal from the village.

During the battle, 2 KLA fighters and 1 policeman were killed, while 3 policemen and Ramush Haradinaj were wounded.

== Clashes on 11-12 August ==
The Yugoslav forces first broke through the KLA lines and entered Glođane around 10–11 August 1998, as reported by BBC Correspondent Jeremey Cooke who was on the scene. He reported that the Yugoslav government forces "knew they had the upper hand" and had "shelled and machine-gunned" the village of Glođane into submission. Cooke reported seeing houses shelled and livestock slaughtered to prevent rebels from reentering the village. Paramilitary units were reported to have been involved in the operation.

The next offensive involving Glođane occurred in the beginning of September. KLA forces had regrouped and in September, the Yugoslav military moved through the villages around the Lake Radonjić in order to attack the KLA. Colonel John Crosland, an English military officer attached to the VJ, was a firsthand witness on the destruction caused by those forces. He noted that he personally witnessed the looting and burning of houses by Yugoslav forces and that the village of Prilep was razed to 18 inches about the ground. He stated that VJ forces, police forces and paramilitary forces, including (MUP, PJP, SAJ, OPG, Munja) and JSO (Frenki's men), were involved in the offensive.

Shortly after capturing Glođane, VJ forces withdrew from the village, resulting in a returned presence of KLA forces.

During the operation, KLA member Idriz Gashi murdered a civilian suspected of collaborating with Yugoslav police. Her body was dropped into the Radonjić Lake where, along with other bodies, was found in September 1998. Gashi was found guilty and was sentenced to 14 years in prison by the Kosovo Supreme Court in 2010.

== See also ==
- Timeline of the Kosovo War
