= Dashinoc =

Dashinoc: Dashinoc (Albanian); Дашиновац/Dašinovac (Serbian)
- Village
- Location in Kosovo
- Coordinates: 42°32′10″N 20°23′53″E
- Location: Kosovo
- District: Peja
- Municipality: Deçan

Population (2024)
  - Total: 244
- Time zone: UTC+1 (CET)
  - Summer (DST): UTC+2 (CEST)

Dashinoc (Serbian Cyrillic: Дашиновац; Albanian: Dashinoc) is a village in the Deçan Municipality in western Kosovo.

== History ==
Throughout 1998, the village and surrounding area was the scene of fighting between the Kosovo Liberation Army (KLA) and Yugoslav security forces during the Kosovo War. From March 1998, the KLA mounted a campaign to capture the village of Dashinoc and the surrounding area with the intent of driving out local Serbs. On 22 April 1998, Dashinoc was captured by the KLA with many of the local Serbs fleeing amid reports of unexplained disappearances. Three Serbs remained in the village and on 16 September 1998, their bodies were discovered at Lake Radonjić, murdered as part of the Lake Radonjić massacre.

== Demographics ==
The village is exclusively inhabited by Albanians.
