= Bare, Mitrovica =

Bare
- Village
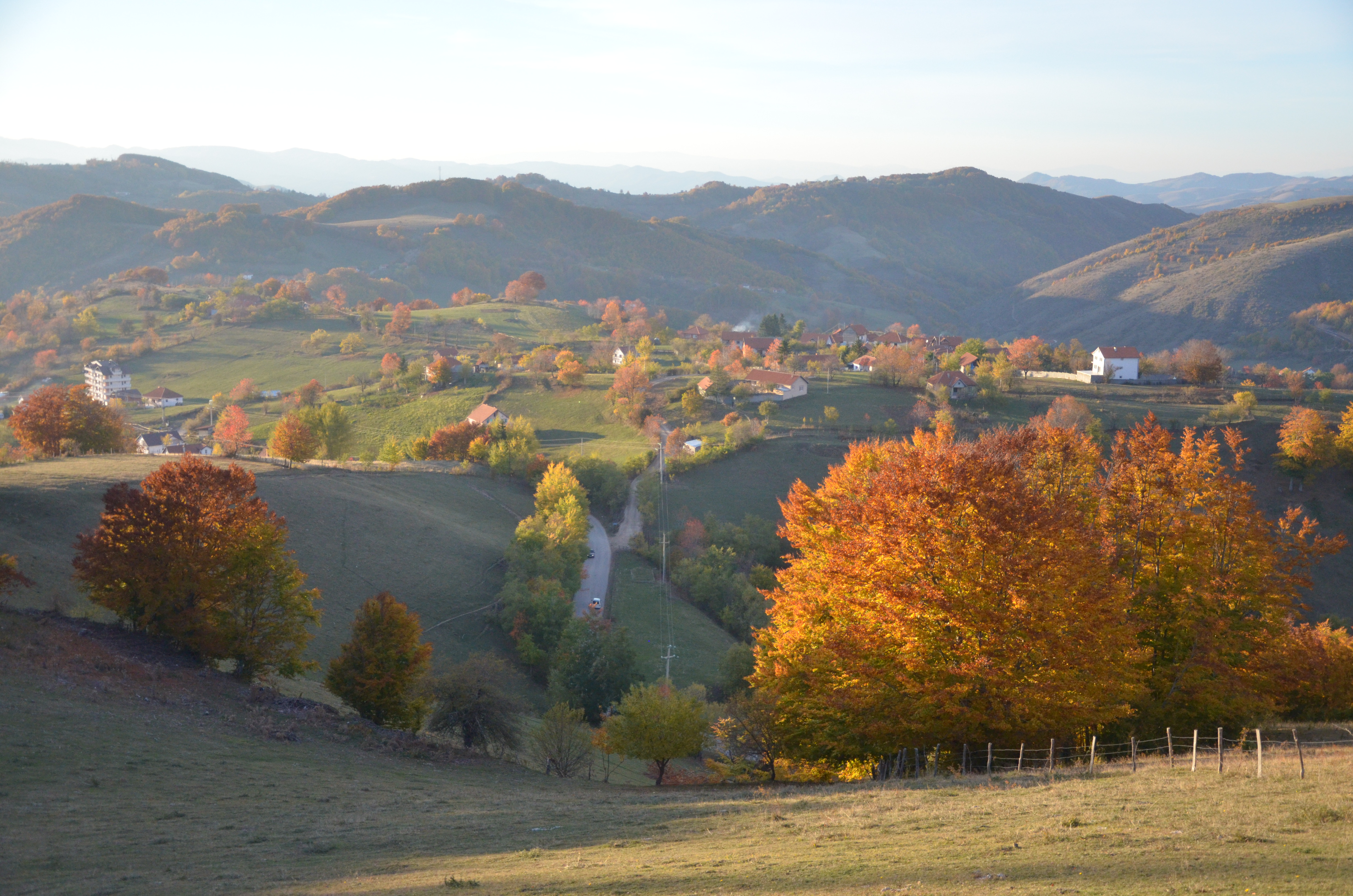

- Location in Kosovo Bare (Europe)
- Coordinates: 42°57′07.7″N 20°57′57.0″E
- Location: Kosovo
- District: Mitrovicë
- Municipality: Mitrovicë

Population (2024)
  - Total: 298
- Time zone: UTC+1 (CET)

Bare (Albanian definite form: Barja, Serbian: Баре/Bare) is a village in the municipality of Mitrovica in the District of Mitrovica, Kosovo. According to the 2024 census, it had 298 inhabitants, all of whom were Albanian. It is part of the region Shala e Bajgorës.

== History ==
During the Kosovo War, the Brigade 141 "Mehë Uka" of the Kosovo Liberation Army was active in the village. On 8 January 1999, the KLA captured 8 and killed 3 Serbian soldiers.
