= Pastasel massacre =

- Location: Pastasellë, Kosovo (then AP Kosovo, Serbia, FR Yugoslavia)
- Date: 31 March 1999
- Target: Kosovo Albanian male civilians
- Attack type: Mass killing, androcide, ethnic cleansing
- Deaths: 106
- Perpetrators: Yugoslav security forces and Serbian police
- Motive: Retaliation for fighting earlier in the village

The Pastasel massacre was a mass execution of 106 Kosovo Albanian civilians during the Kosovo war, which took place on 31 March 1999. Serbian forces surrounded the village and upon entering they expelled the women whilst they gathered the males and summarily executed them. The victims were mostly above the age of 55 but also children aged 13 to 17. Fighting between the KLA and Serbian forces had occurred near the village prior to the massacre. Human Rights Watch conjectured that a KLA base in the neighboring village of Drenoc could have triggered the massacre.

== Background ==
The village of Pastasel (Albanian: Pastasellë) is a village near the city of Rahovec and lays in the municipality with his name. The village consists of around 100 homes and is exclusively inhabited by Albanians. During the Kosovo war fighting between the Kosovo Liberation Army (KLA) and Yugoslav forces took place in near the village. According to witnesses, the KLA had a base in the neighboring village of Drenoc, but was not in Pastasel. On March 28, 1999, a military offensive was launched against the KLA in the region south of Klina and north-east of Rahovec. The operation involved a joint-command effort of the Yugoslav Army, Special Police Units, and reserve unit members. Simultaneously, the Albanian population in the area were forced to leave their homes due to repeated threats and shelling of their villages. Prior to the massacre the population of the village had doubled as many refugees fleeing the fighting from other parts of Kosovo had sought refuge there. Fighting had taken place in the village between the KLA and Yugoslav forces, the Serb forces had retaliated by attacking the civilian population after their defeat.

== Massacre ==
Serbian forces composed of police, military and paramilitary surrounded the village in the afternoon of 31 March 1999. They then attacked with artillery, tanks and mortars. Following an hour of grenade-throwing, the Serb forces assembled the local residents in the field, segregating the men from the women. Subsequently, women had their jewelry and money confiscated by the Serbian forces and were instructed to depart from the village. After the women had left the Serb forced confiscated several thousands worth of German marks from the victims and ID cards. A survivor of the massacre recounted that when his papers were taken, he was told: "You won't need any ID where you're going." The group of men were divided into 4. The first group consisting of around 8-7 young men or children aged 13–17 were first beaten and interrogated. They were then lined up on a gully and executed by machine gun fire. the 3 other groups were also lined up and fired upon in the same manner. In total 4 groups consisting of 106 Albanian civilians were executed.

== Aftermath and legacy ==
=== Media reports ===
The first reports of the Pastasel massacre surfaced in Kosovapress, a news agency associated with the KLA. On April 3, they issued a brief bulletin about the massacre and subsequently published a list of ninety-nine deceased individuals the following day. Images taken by NATO reconnaissance planes on the 9 April which showed mass graves in Pastasel were released to the press on the 11 April. The presence of mass graves garnered significant attention in the Western media. Despite NATO imagery of the mass graves and survivors' first-hand descriptions of the massacre, some media stories disputing the accounts of the killings in Pastasel and the NATO imagery persisted. Human Rights Watch conducted its own interviews and inspected the scene, confirming that the massacre did indeed occur as initially reported.

=== Removal of evidence ===
Approximately two weeks after the photographs' release, Serbian forces returned Pastasel to eliminate physical evidence of the crime. Human Rights Watch interviewed a witness, around April 24, he witnessed unidentified individuals exhuming the bodies using a small tractor at the burial site. These individuals, dressed in medical outfits and masks, transported the bodies towards Rahovec in two civilian trucks. The BBC news program, Panorama, sent reporters to Pastasel after NATO's entry into Kosovo. They obtained video footage reportedly taken by Kosovar Albanian villagers, who observed the exhumation from a hill overlooking the burial site. The footage depicted a large truck and individuals in protective clothing, including police officers, working near the mosque. The BBC's investigation suggested that some of the exhumed bodies were subsequently taken to the village of Zrze, southwest of Rahovec, where they were reburied in the village cemetery.

== Sources ==
Abrahams, Fred; Ward, Benjamin N. (2001). Under orders: war crimes in Kosovo. Human Rights Watch. New York London: Human Rights Watch. ISBN 978-1-56432-264-7.
