= 1998 Panda Bar massacre =

14 December 1998 attack in Kosovo

Panda Bar massacre
- Location: Peć, Kosovo, FR Yugoslavia
- Date: 14 December 1998 (UTC+1)
- Target: Serbian civilians
- Weapon: Automatic rifles
- Deaths: 6
- Injuries: 15
- Perpetrator: Unknown

The Panda Bar massacre (Serbian: Масакр у Панда Бару, romanized: Masakr u Panda Baru), alternatively known as the Panda Café attack (Serbian: Напад на кафић "Панда", romanized: Napad na kafić "Panda"), was an attack on Serbian civilians in the city of Peć, Kosovo, on the night of 14–15 December 1998. Two masked men opened fire into a coffeehouse, killing six Serb youths and wounding 15 others.

The attack came at a time of heightened tensions due to an orchestrated ambush by the Serbian police against the Kosovo Liberation Army (KLA) who were smuggling weapons and supplies from Albania. The Panda Bar attack appeared as a reprisal, and broke the brief cease-fire between the Albanian and Serbian forces during the Kosovo War. The KLA was accused, but did not accept responsibility at the time. Six Albanian young men were arrested and tortured in custody at the time, but acquitted in the trial. However, the President of Serbia, Aleksandar Vučić, stated in 2013 that there was no evidence that Albanians were responsible for this attack.

Speculation that the crime may have been committed by the State Security Directorate had been put forward in the past, but the crime remained unsolved as no new evidence had come forward for a long time. Among Kosovo Albanians, the Panda Bar massacre is considered to have been used as a pretext for the attacks of the Serbian army and police against Albanian villages.

== Timeline ==
The attack on the Panda Bar came within hours of a border ambush in which at least 31 fighters from the KLA were killed by Serbian troops. That evening, suspected and alleged KLA gunmen entered a Serb-owned café in Peja and opened fire on the patrons, killing six Serb youths. The victims were a 14-year-old, a 16-year-old, three 17-year-olds and one 25-year-old. Western diplomats suspected that the attack was carried out by the KLA in retribution for the ambush. The KLA denied responsibility; journalist Tim Judah noted that some of the diplomats thought the attack might have been carried out by a rogue unit.

The shooting appalled foreign emissaries, and at a meeting with Milošević the following day, Holbrooke condemned it as an act of terrorism and described the situation in Kosovo as "very grave". Milošević issued a separate statement accusing the international community of failing to prevent attacks on Serb civilians, stating: "The terrorist gangs have not ceased attacking the army, the police, and inhabitants of Kosovo." Nikola Šainović, in an interview with BBC, stated:

"We blocked Peć and started the search. Our first reaction was that the crime in Panda was the revenge of the KLA for the ambush the day before, during the attempt to penetrate the border through Albania, when nine KLA members were captured and 35 were killed, which was their biggest single loss in 1998. The police, on the basis of assessments and intelligence data, who might have a connection with the KLA, began house searches and, when I arrived, I was told that several people had already been detained, that some weapons had been found, that these people were not currently in to some KLA formation, but to interrogate them.."

— Nikola Šainović in an interview with BBC

The attack led to an immediate crackdown on the Albanian-populated southern quarter of Peja in Kapešnica and Zatra. The areas were sealed off, and houses were searched systematically. Media reports stated that Serbian police killed two Kosovo Albanians during the operation. The Organization for Security and Co-operation in Europe (OSCE) later made a report on the event and its aftermath, calling it the Panda Bar incident.

Six young Albanian men between the ages of 17 and 22 were arrested in the aftermath of the event. They were tortured and one of them confessed to the murder under torture. In the trial they were acquitted as no evidence existed about their involvement. They were convicted to one year in prison each for breaching public order, but were released a month later. Since then, one of them has developed mental health problems which have deteriorated over time. Another one went to become a finance officer at the municipality of Peja.

== Investigation ==
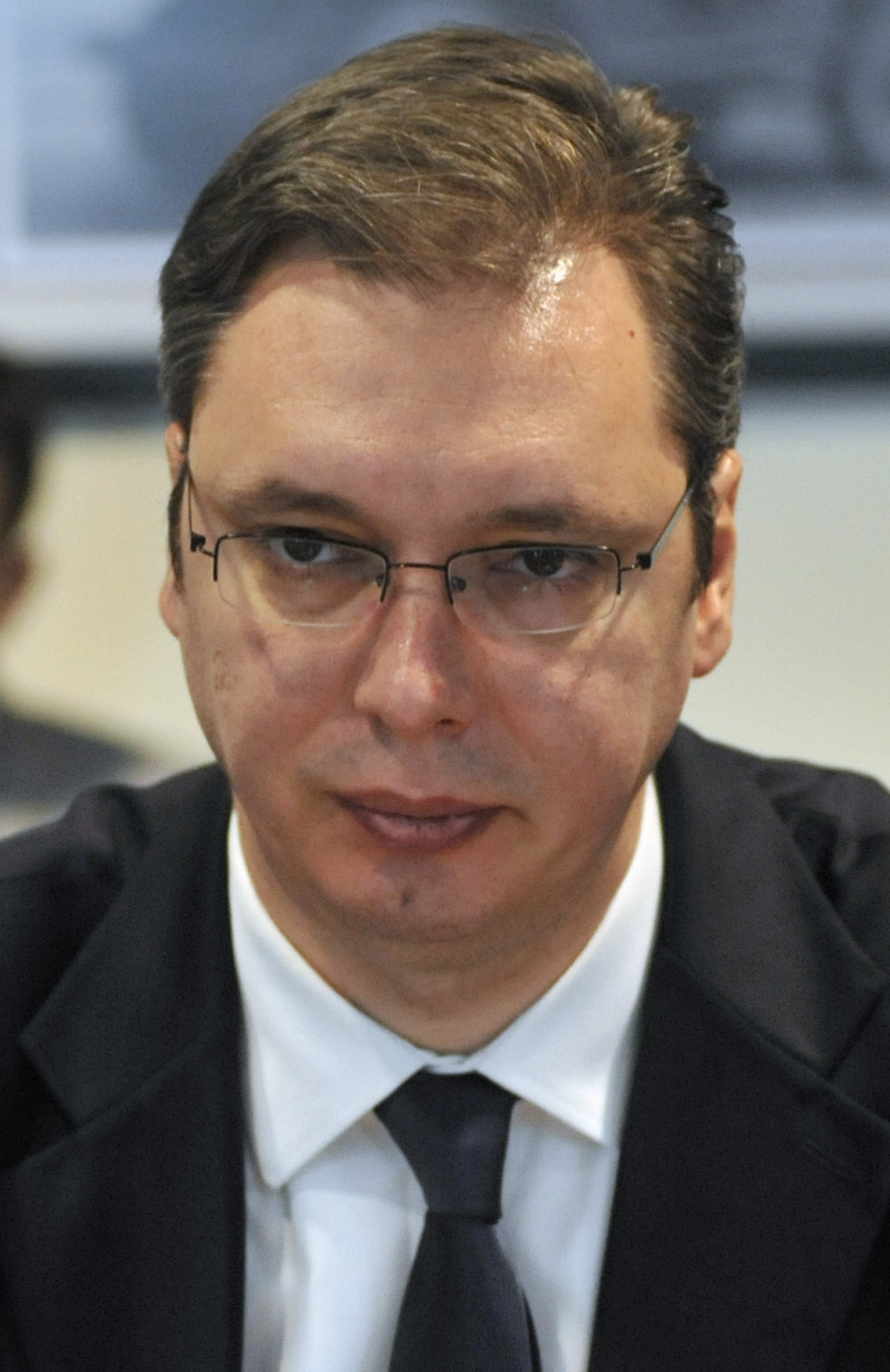
Vučić is the first Serbian official to dispute that the KLA (Albanians in general) carried out the massacre

An investigation was started in 2011, with the grave stones of the victims being destroyed. In December 2013, the then First Deputy Prime Minister of Serbia Aleksandar Vučić acknowledged that there is no evidence that murder was committed by Albanians. The Serbian Organised Crime Prosecutor's Office launched a new investigation in 2016 and reached the conclusion that the massacre was not perpetrated by Albanians. Speculation that the crime may have been committed by the Serbian state security services had been put forward in the past, but the crime remained unsolved as no new evidence had come forward for a long time.

== See also ==
- War crimes in the Kosovo War
- 2004 unrest in Kosovo
- False flag

== Annotations ==
1. The victims were Ivan Obadović (14 years old), Vukota Gvozdenović (16), Svetislav Ristić (17), Zoran Stanojević (17), Dragan Trifović (17) and university student Ivan Radević (25). Gvozdenović, Ristić, Stanojević and Trifović were highly graded students of the Sveti Sava gymnasium in Peć. The father of Radević was a half year later kidnapped and murdered by Albanians.

== Sources ==
Books

- Bellamy, A. (2002). Kosovo and International Society. Palgrave Macmillan. ISBN 978-0-230-59760-0.
- Judah, Tim (2002). Kosovo: War and Revenge. New Haven and London: Yale University Press. ISBN 978-0-30009-725-2.
- Landis, Dan; Albert, Rosita D. (2012). Handbook of Ethnic Conflict: International Perspectives. Springer Science & Business Media. pp. 356–. ISBN 978-1-4614-0447-7.
- Ivo Aertsen; Jana Arsovska; Holger-C Rohne; Marta Valiñas; Kris Vanspauwen (2013). Restoring Justice after Large-scale Violent Conflicts. Routledge. pp. 83–. ISBN 978-1-134-00623-6.

Newspaper articles

- Politika (13 December 2008). "Десет година од убиства српских младића у Пећи". Politika.
- RTS (14 December 2015). "Годишњица убиства српских младића у Пећи". RTS.
- Novosti; Tanjug; Blic. "ISTINA SE KRIJE 19 GODINA Kobne noći dvojica maskiranih muškaraca ušli su u kafe "Panda" i izrešetali rafalima šestoricu SRPSKIH MLADIĆA". Blic.
