= July 18, 1998, Albanian–Yugoslav border clashes =

July 18, 1998 Albanian–Yugoslav border clashes
- Part of the Kosovo War
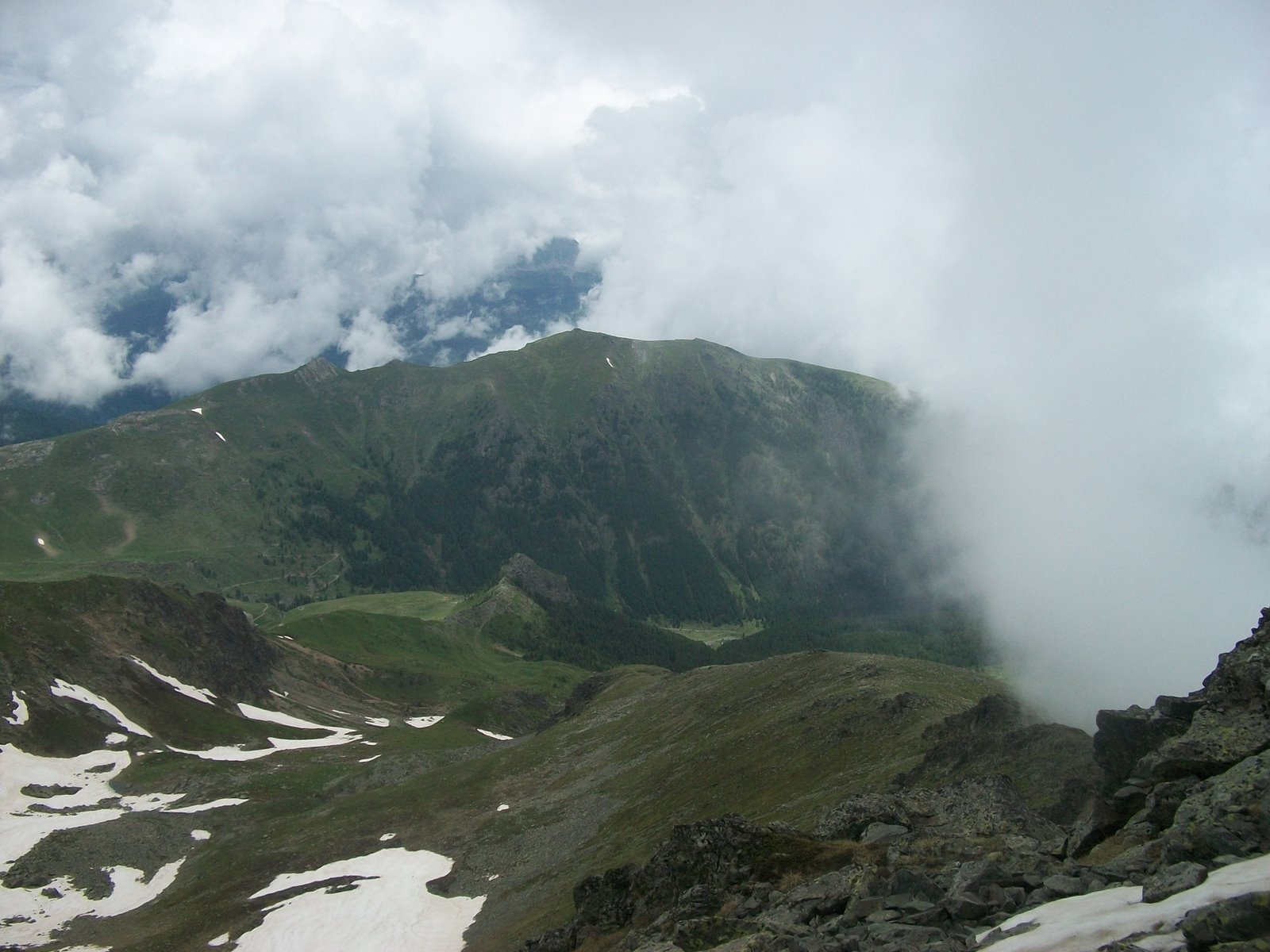
- The canyons of Mount Đeravica
Date	July 18, 1998
Location	Albanian–Yugoslav border 42.533611°N 20.14°E
Result	Yugoslav victory

Belligerents
(Federal Republic of Yugoslavia) FR Yugoslavia	Kosovo Liberation Army; Mujahideen

Commanders and leaders
(Federal Republic of Yugoslavia) Božidar Delić	Alija Rabić †

Strength
(Federal Republic of Yugoslavia) Unknown	200–1,000 militants 50 volunteers

Casualties and losses
(Federal Republic of Yugoslavia) 2 wounded	18 mujahideen killed 4 KLA militants killed 31 wounded 6 captured
- Location of Mount Đeravica in Kosovo

On July 18, 1998, a Yugoslav Army (VJ) border patrol ambushed a column of Kosovo Liberation Army (KLA) insurgents and foreign mujahideen just west of Deçan, on the frontier between Albania and Yugoslavia. The ambush resulted in the deaths of four KLA fighters and 18 mujahideen, most of whom were citizens of Saudi Arabia. Twelve militants were wounded, and a further six were arrested by the Yugoslav authorities and charged with illegal entry and gunrunning. The VJ reported seizing a significant amount of arms and ammunition that the militants had been smuggling. One Yugoslav border guard was seriously wounded in the clash.

According to the Israeli historian Shaul Shay, the ambush represented the first clash of the Kosovo War between the VJ and foreign mujahideen. The Human Rights Watch advisor Fred C. Abrahams conjectures that the mujahideen may have deliberately been led into a trap by the KLA as part of a plan to reduce the influence of Islamic extremists within the organization's ranks.

Later in the day, 19 KLA fighters were wounded when the VJ shelled an arms smuggling route near the site of the ambush. They were evacuated by Albanian border guards and airlifted to receive treatment in the country's capital, Tirana. Albanian officials later alleged that two of the mortar rounds fired by Yugoslav troops had landed inside Albania, sparking further tension between the two countries. That afternoon, KLA militants attacked a Yugoslav border patrol, wounding another soldier.

== Background ==
Following World War II, Kosovo was given the status of an autonomous province within the Socialist Republic of Serbia, one of six constitutional republics of the Socialist Federal Republic of Yugoslavia. After the death of Yugoslavia's long-time leader Josip Broz Tito in 1980, Yugoslavia's political system began to unravel. In 1989, Belgrade revoked Kosovo's autonomy as part of Serbian President Slobodan Milošević's "anti-bureaucratic revolution". Kosovo, a province predominantly inhabited by ethnic Albanians, is of great historical and cultural significance to Serbs, who formed a majority there before the mid-19th century but by 1990 represented only about ten percent of the population. (Note: The population transfers that followed the 1876–78 Serbian–Ottoman War resulted in tens of thousands of Albanians leaving the South Morava valley and tens of thousands of Serbs leaving Kosovo, entrenching ethnic hatred and shifting the demographic balance in the affected areas. High Albanian birthrates, compounded by increasing Serb emigration from Kosovo, greatly reduced the proportion of Serbs in the region by the end of the 20th century.) Alarmed by their dwindling numbers, the province's Serbs began to fear that they were being "squeezed out" by the Albanians, and ethnic tensions worsened. Once Kosovo's autonomy was abolished, a minority government run by Serbs and Montenegrins was appointed by Milošević to oversee the province, enforced by thousands of heavily armed paramilitaries from Serbia-proper. Albanian culture was systematically repressed and hundreds of thousands of Albanians working in state-owned companies lost their jobs. In 1991–92, the Socialist Federal Republic of Yugoslavia disintegrated following the secession of former constituent republics Slovenia, Croatia, Macedonia and Bosnia-Herzegovina. In 1992, amidst the breakup of Yugoslavia and the Yugoslav Wars, the Federal Republic of Yugoslavia, a Serb-controlled federation consisting of Serbia (including Kosovo) and Montenegro, was proclaimed.

In 1996, a group of Albanian nationalists calling themselves the Kosovo Liberation Army (KLA) began attacking the Serb-dominated Yugoslav Army (Serbo-Croatian: Vojska Jugoslavije; VJ) and the Serbian Ministry of Internal Affairs (Serbo-Croatian: Ministarstvo unutrašnjih poslova; MUP) in Kosovo. Their goal was to separate the province from the rest of Yugoslavia. At first, the KLA carried out hit-and-run attacks (31 in 1996, 55 in 1997, and 66 in January and February 1998 alone). It gained popularity among young Kosovo Albanians, many of whom rejected the non-violent resistance to Yugoslav authorities advocated by the politician Ibrahim Rugova and favoured a more aggressive approach. The organization received a significant boost in 1997, when an armed uprising in neighbouring Albania led to thousands of weapons from the Albanian Army's depots being looted. Many of these weapons ended up in the hands of the KLA, which already had substantial resources due its involvement in the trafficking of drugs, weapons and people, as well as through donations from the Albanian diaspora. Cross-border arms smuggling flourished; the unit charged with securing the Yugoslav border was the 549th Motorized Brigade, under the command of General Božidar Delić.

The KLA's popularity skyrocketed after the VJ and MUP attacked the compound of KLA leader Adem Jashari in March 1998, killing him, his closest associates and most of his family. The attack prompted thousands of young Kosovo Albanians to join the ranks of the KLA, fueling the Kosovar uprising that eventually erupted in the spring of 1998.

== Timeline ==
=== Prelude ===
In the summer of 1998, a number of senior U.S. intelligence officials met with the leaders of the KLA, and Central Intelligence Agency (CIA) agents arrived in northern Albania to monitor the fighting in Kosovo and assist in training rebel fighters. In exchange for American military, financial and intelligence support, KLA leaders promised not to carry out any actions outside Kosovo, not to continue participating in the drug trade, and not to accept help from Islamic radicals. Thus, the KLA ordered the 36 foreign Islamist fighters (or mujahideen) fighting in their ranks to leave Kosovo. Though few Kosovo Albanians sympathized with the Islamists, some argued that the KLA should have accepted assistance from any source, fundamentalist or otherwise. When KLA commanders ordered the mujahideen to leave, they refused, and disagreements arose within the KLA ranks as what was to be done with them.

Serb sources assert that the first mujahideen began arriving in Kosovo in the spring of 1998, mainly from Bosnia and Herzegovina. By that summer, about 240 mujahideen were present in Kosovo and northern Albania. Most of these were ethnic Albanians, but the group also included several dozen Arabs from the Middle East and North Africa. They were led by a militant named Alija Rabić.

=== Clashes ===
In the early morning hours of Saturday, July 18, 1998, the mujahideen and KLA militants left their base in northern Albania and departed for Kosovo. Estimates of their strength vary. Human Rights Watch observer Fred C. Abrahams writes that the group consisted of 24 mujahideen and 200 KLA. The political scientist David L. Phillips and diplomat Nicholas Burns state that there were 22 mujahideen and 300 KLA fighters. Tim Judah, a journalist specializing in the Balkans, believes that the group may have been made up of as many as 700 militants. The VJ reported up to 1,000 militants. The group crossed the Albanian–Yugoslav border at Maja e Ujazës, northeast of Bajram Curri. The guerrillas were carrying a large quantity of arms and ammunition, which significantly impeded their movement and obliged them to move slowly across the Albanian–Yugoslav frontier. One hypothesis is that they were heading to reinforce KLA fighters battling for the town of Orahovac.

At 02:00, the column was ambushed by Yugoslav border guards between Mount Đeravica and the Košare border outpost, west of Dečani. The ambush occurred about 6 kilometres (3.7 mi) from the Albanian border. A 122 mm (4.8 in) shell struck the column, killing eight. Clashes ensued, reportedly lasting until about 07:00. According to Abrahams, the ambush ultimately resulted in the deaths of 22 militants, including 18 mujahideen and four KLA. (Note: Initial reports suggested that the ambush resulted in the deaths of anywhere between 30 and 90 militants. The KLA insisted that it had not lost more than ten of its fighters.) Twelve militants were wounded. Rabić was among those killed; documents recording the KLA and mujahideen's journey were recovered off his corpse by the Yugoslav authorities. Sixteen of the mujahideen were citizens of Saudi Arabia and one was a citizen of Yemen. Six were carrying forged Macedonian passports under ethnic Albanian pseudonyms. According to the Israeli historian Shaul Shay, the incident represented the first skirmish between the VJ and foreign mujahideen during the Kosovo War. It is unclear if the ambush came as a result of Yugoslav vigilance or if the KLA deliberately led the mujahideen into a trap with the goal of eliminating them and thus limiting the influence of Islamic extremists within the KLA's ranks. Survivors told monitors from the Organization for Security and Co-operation in Europe that KLA fighters had led the mujahideen into a trap and fled. A Yugoslav lance corporal was seriously wounded in the exchange.

Most of the surviving militants either retreated to Albania or went into hiding along the border. As they fled, they dropped large quantities of Chinese-made weapons and munitions, which were subsequently seized by the Yugoslav authorities. Six militants, all citizens of Albania, were captured. They were charged with illegally crossing the border and gunrunning. Yugoslav officials stated that more than 10 tonnes (9.8 long tons; 11 short tons) of weapons and ammunition, including about 300 rifles, 60 machine guns, ten recoilless guns and a number of mortars, had been confiscated. Later that day, the VJ shelled a known arms trafficking route near the site of the ambush, wounding 19 KLA fighters. The militants were rescued by Albanian border guards and airlifted by helicopter to receive treatment in a Tirana hospital. At 13:30, two militants opened fire on a Yugoslav border patrol within 300 metres (980 ft) of the Albanian frontier. The border patrol returned fire and the militants fled to Albania. One Yugoslav soldier was slightly wounded.

== Aftermath ==
Judah described the ambush as a "catastrophic disaster" for the KLA. Albania's deputy Minister of Interior Affairs, Ilir Çano, claimed two Yugoslav mortars had landed inside Albania. "These ... incidents could have very dangerous consequences," he warned. Albanian officials indicated that the mortars did not cause any injuries. Albania lodged a formal protest and demanded an explanation from the Yugoslav authorities. Yugoslav officials denied shelling the border and accused the Albanian authorities of turning a blind eye to KLA arms smuggling in northern Albania. Albanian Foreign Minister Paskal Milo stated that Albania "expresses its fraternal solidarity and supports the just struggle of Albanians in Kosovo." The Albanian Government released a statement describing the ambush as a "Serb provocation" and calling on the international community to "stop, by any means, the fascist aggression Belgrade is inflicting on the Albanian population of Kosovo." In turn, Yugoslav officials accused Albania of sending 300 soldiers to fight alongside the KLA in Kosovo, citing the testimony of captured KLA personnel. Albanian officials denied having troops in the province.

The United States warned Yugoslavia against shelling Albanian territory. State Department spokesman James Rubin told reporters that the alleged shelling was likely an attempt to prevent the insurgents from re-entering Kosovo. "If true, the shelling represents an unacceptable violation of Albanian territory." He continued. "Belgrade must understand that such shelling runs the risk of further escalating the current conflict." Rubin said that the U.S. was opposed to the creation of a pan-Albanian state, and emphasized that calls for its establishment were a "very dangerous development that could affect the stability of the region." Russian officials accused KLA fighters of stoking the clashes, and called for peace talks between the militants and Yugoslav authorities. On July 19, Albanian officials requested that Greece—an important trading partner for Albania and traditional ally of Serbia—mediate to end the fighting. Greek Foreign Minister Theodoros Pangalos issued a condemnation, saying "these senseless acts of violence must stop." The European Union condemned the militant incursion, as well as the alleged cross-border shelling.

== See also ==
- April 23, 1998 Albanian–Yugoslav border ambush
- December 14, 1998 Albanian–Yugoslav border ambush
