= Lake Radonjić massacre =

Massacre of Kosovo Serbs at Lake Radonjic

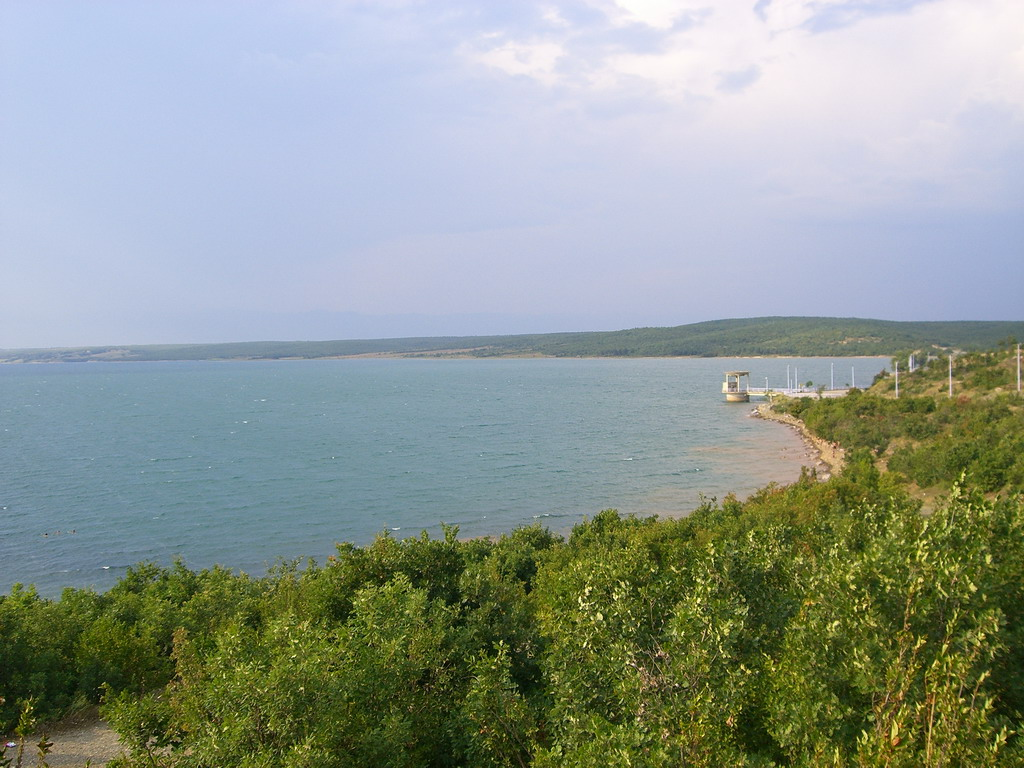
- Lake Radonjić
- Location: Lake Radonjić, near Gloane, Kosovo, FR Yugoslavia
- Date: September 1998
- Target: Kosovo Serbs and Roma civilians
- Attack type: Summary executions, mass killings
- Deaths: 34–39 killed
- Perpetrator: Kosovo Liberation Army (suspected)

The Lake Radonjić massacre or the Massacre at Lake Radonjić (Serbian: Масакр на Радоњићком језеру, Albanian: Masakra e Liqenit të Radoniqit) refers to the mass murder of at least 34 Kosovo Serb, Kosovo Albanian and Roma civilians near Lake Radonjić, by the Kosovo Liberation Army (KLA) at the village of Glođane, in Kosovo, Federal Republic of Yugoslavia on 9 September 1998. The massacre took place during the Kosovo War.

== Background ==
Location of Lake Radonjić in Kosovo

In 1989, Kosovo's autonomy within Yugoslavia was revoked. Soon after, the Kosovo Liberation Army (KLA) was formed to fight the Yugoslav establishment. After a string of minor attacks, the KLA's mission became much more aggressive, which led to them claiming areas that were key to Serbia's fuel-supply, near the town of Orahovac. Years of ethnic tension had preceded the Kosovo War, and spilled into numerous atrocities on both sides.

Beginning in March 1998, the KLA under the command of Ramush Haradinaj mounted a campaign north of Lake Radonjić to seize control over the area between Glođane and Dečani. By April 1998, almost every Serb civilian in the KLA operational zone were either killed or expelled from the area, with Albanian civilians considered collaborators also facing attacks. Between March and September 1998, the KLA abducted over 60 civilians, subsequently killing many of them. In September 1998, the Yugoslav Army (VJ) and police mounted a counter-offensive and captured a series of villages around Lake Radonjić from the KLA beginning with Prilep, Isniq, Dašinovac and Glođane. In September 1998, the Yugoslav Army (VJ) and police mounted a counter-offensive and captured a series of villages around Lake Radonjić from the KLA beginning with Prilep, Isniq, Dašinovac and Glodjane. KLA forces had grown stronger and tended to control villages away from the main roads while the Yugoslav military was positioned on the hills around Lake Radonjić. Throughout the summer, Yugoslav forces shelled surrounding Albanian villages around Lake Radonjić from their position on the hills daily. In September, the Yugoslav military moved through the villages around the lake in order to attack and expel the KLA. Colonel John Crosland, an English military officer attached to the VJ, witnessed this first hand and commented on the destruction caused by those forces. He noted that he personally witnessed looting and burning of houses by Serbian forces and that the village of Prilep was razed to 18 inches about the ground. He stated that the VJ, Serbian police forces and paramilitary police forces including MUP, PJP, SAJ, and JSO were involved in the offensive.

== Massacre ==
After the offensive, approximately thirty bodies were discovered by a Serbian forensic team. They were likely the victims of the KLA, among whom were Idriz Gashi, Martti Harsia, and Avni Krasniqi. The corpses were then taken away from Glodjane, and were thrown into Lake Radonjić. Serbian authorities, however, refused access to international forensic teams, despite the fact that Helena Ranta, a famous international forensic expert, specifically requested access to the site Instead, the Serbian forensic team conducted the investigation themselves which caused Human Rights Watch to raise questions about the credibility of the evidence recovered.

The thirty bodies found in the Lake Radonjić canal consisted of individuals of Serbian, Albanian and Roma ethnicity. The Trial Chamber of the International Criminal Tribunal for the former Yugoslavia (ICTY) and forensic records showed that they had been killed over a period of six months from April to September 1998 during the beginning of the armed conflict in Kosovo.

== Aftermath ==
After talks between Yugoslavia and the West broke down at the Rambouillet peace accords, NATO commenced a 78-day-long bombing campaign of Serbian military and infrastructure targets. Serb forces withdrew from Kosovo on 11 June 1999. On February 17, 2008, representatives of the people of Kosovo unilaterally declared Kosovo's independence and subsequently adopted the Constitution of Kosovo, which came into effect on 15 June 2008. The declaration was met with mixed-responses from International Governments.

The 30 to 37 bodies discovered were widely viewed as victims of the KLA and they formed the basis of the ICTY indictment of three ethnic Albanians. The ICTY Trial Chamber assessed the evidence discovered at Lake Radonjić canal in detail over a three-year trial. It found that seven of the bodies from the Lake Radonjić canal were proven to have been killed by the KLA. These seven individuals were Zenun Gashi, Nurije Krasniqi, Istref Krasniqi, Sanije Balaj, and the mother and the two sisters of Witnesses 4 and 19.

With respect to the other individuals, the court noted that some of the other individuals were likely killed by the KLA but cautioned jumping to conclusions because it had received evidence that some individuals could have been killed to settle old personal scores, or as the result of ordinary criminal behavior, or to further blood feuds in a region where law and order had broken down.

The Court found that the evidence for the rest of the bodies found at the canal was problematic, as the evidence as to whom the perpetrators were was often non-existent . The pattern of crimes suggested haphazard criminal behavior rather than organised KLA involvement.

One forensic expert thought that some of the bodies found around the canal showed signs of having been moved to that location. The defence lawyers at the court argued that this was evidence that Serbian security forces had “planted many of these bodies near the canal in order to frame the KLA.” Serb security forces had been caught moving bodies in Kosovo before. The Court rejected this argument and found that these bodies had legitimately been killed in the area during six months of armed conflict.

== See also ==
- List of massacres in the Kosovo War
- War crimes in the Kosovo War
- Batajnica mass graves
