= December 14, 1998, Albanian–Yugoslav border ambush =

- Part of the Kosovo War
Date	December 14, 1998
Location	Border of Albania and FR Yugoslavia 42°16′32″N 20°32′15″E
Result	Yugoslav victory

Belligerents
Yugoslav Army	Kosovo Liberation Army

Commanders and leaders
Unknown	Mujë Krasniqi †

Strength
Unknown	140 militants

Casualties and losses
None	36 killed 12 wounded 9 captured
- Location within Kosovo Site of the ambush (Serbia and Montenegro)

On December 14, 1998, the Army of the Federal Republic of Yugoslavia (Vojska Jugoslavije, VJ) ambushed a group of 140 Kosovo Liberation Army (KLA) militants attempting to smuggle weapons and supplies from their base in Albania into the Federal Republic of Yugoslavia (Serbia and Montenegro). A five-hour battle ensued, ending with the deaths of 36 militants and the capture of a further nine. Dozens more fled back to Albania, abandoning large quantities of weapons and supplies, which the Serbian authorities subsequently seized. The ambush was the most serious war-related incident in Kosovo since a U.S.-negotiated truce took effect two months before. It came on the heels of increasing tensions in the province, where inter-ethnic violence had been escalating steadily since early 1995.

Within hours, a group of primarily unknown, but suspected KLA gunmen attacked a Serb-owned café in Peja, killing six unarmed Serb youths. Western diplomats suspected the attack was carried out in retaliation for the ambush, though the KLA denied any responsibility. Many years later, the Serbian government would admit that the massacre was a black operation done by the Serbian secret service.

Several days later after the ambush, Serbian authorities returned the bodies of all but three of the fallen militants following mediation by the International Committee of the Red Cross. The militants were given heroes' funerals in a rebel-held area, in a ceremony attended by thousands of ethnic Albanians, including other KLA fighters. In January 1999, the KLA abducted eight VJ personnel, who were later exchanged for the nine militants captured in the ambush.

== Background ==
In 1989, Belgrade abolished self-rule in Serbia's two autonomous provinces, Vojvodina and Kosovo. Kosovo, a province inhabited predominantly by ethnic Albanians, was of great historical and cultural significance to Serbs. Prior to the mid-19th century they had formed a majority in the province, but by 1990 represented only about 10 percent of the population. Alarmed by their dwindling numbers, the province's Serbs began to fear they were being "squeezed out" by the Albanians, with whom ethnic tensions had been brewing since the early 1980s. As soon as Kosovo's autonomy was abolished, a minority government run by Serbs and Montenegrins was appointed by Serbian President Slobodan Milošević to oversee the province, enforced by thousands of heavily armed paramilitaries from Serbia-proper. Albanian culture was systematically repressed and hundreds of thousands of Albanians working in state-owned companies lost their jobs.

In 1996, a group of Albanian nationalists calling themselves the Kosovo Liberation Army (KLA) began attacking the Army of the Federal Republic of Yugoslavia (Serbo-Croatian: Vojska Jugoslavije; VJ) and the Serbian Ministry of Internal Affairs (Serbo-Croatian: Ministarstvo unutrašnjih poslova; MUP) in Kosovo. Their goal was to separate the province from the rest of Serbia and Montenegro, which had become a rump federation called the Federal Republic of Yugoslavia, following the separation of Slovenia, Croatia, Macedonia and Bosnia and Herzegovina from SFR Yugoslavia in 1991 and 1992. At first, the KLA carried out hit-and-run attacks: 31 in 1996, 55 in 1997, and 66 in January and February 1998 alone. The group quickly gained popularity among young Kosovo Albanians, many of whom favoured a more aggressive approach and rejected the non-violent resistance of politician Ibrahim Rugova. It received a significant boost in 1997 when civil unrest in neighbouring Albania led to thousands of weapons from the Albanian Army's depots being looted. Many of these weapons ended up in the hands of the KLA, which already had substantial resources due to its involvement in the trafficking of drugs, weapons, and people, as well as through donations from the Albanian diaspora. The group's popularity skyrocketed after the VJ and MUP attacked the compound of KLA leader Adem Jashari in March 1998, killing him, his closest associates, and most of his extended family. The attack motivated thousands of young Kosovo Albanians to join the KLA, fueling the Kosovar uprising that eventually erupted in the spring of 1998.

== Timeline ==
=== Prelude ===
The Kosovar conflict escalated over the summer of 1998. The KLA increasingly took to smuggling weapons and supplies from Albania across the border into Kosovo. In September, Serbian officials stated that 90 militants had been killed while attempting to illegally cross the border since January of that year. The Defense Ministry of FR Yugoslavia reported that 947 rifles, 161 light machine guns, 33 mortars, 55 mines, 3,295 hand grenades, and almost 350,000 rounds of ammunition had been confiscated over the same period.

In October 1998, Milošević and U.S. envoy Richard Holbrooke reached an agreement to temporarily end the fighting, whereby FR Yugoslavia would halve the number of troops and police personnel stationed in Kosovo. The agreement came after Holbrooke convinced the KLA to consider negotiations with Belgrade while making it clear to Milošević that failing to find a peaceful solution to the conflict would lead to a NATO bombing campaign against Serbia. The agreement required FR Yugoslavia to let Kosovo Verification Mission (KVM) observers enter Kosovo to ensure that the authorities were abiding by their commitment to withdraw thousands of soldier and police officers from the province. Small-scale clashes continued, and by December, over 1,000 people had been killed and more than 300,000 displaced in the fighting.

=== Clashes ===
At around 02:00 on the morning of Monday, December 14, 1998, 140 KLA militants tried to illegally cross the Albanian–Yugoslav border between the outposts of Gorozhup and Liken, about 70 kilometres (43 mi) west of Pristina. They were coming from a base inside Albania, where they had been training. The subsequent ambush occurred near the village of Kušnin, just west of Prizren. The militants had been trying to smuggle weapons, ammunition and supplies to be used by KLA fighters in Kosovo. A member of the KVM told reporters that the militants encountered a Yugoslav sentry post and were attacked by the guards. One of the militants was killed instantly and the column started retreating. As the militants turned back they were ambushed and another 25 were killed. The bodies of five other militants were soon discovered not far from the site of the ambush, raising the number of KLA fatalities to 31. Fighting between the militants and the border guards continued for about five hours. Gunfire and explosions could reportedly be heard in three nearby villages. By 07:00, a total of 36 militants had been killed, twelve were wounded and a further nine were captured. The militants who were not killed or captured either managed to flee back to Albania or went into hiding along the border, according to a KVM monitor. The authorities of FR Yugoslavia reported they had suffered no casualties, and stated that large quantities of "modern weapons", ammunition and supplies had been seized.

The VJ allowed a team of KVM observers to view the bodies, and photograph and record the names of the prisoners. Organization for Security and Cooperation in Europe (OSCE) observers were also escorted to the site, and reported seeing 31 bodies in camouflage uniforms with KLA insignia. They identified one woman among the dead. The KVM reported that another woman had been taken prisoner. A KVM monitor told reporters: "Our initial feelings are that this was a normal military operation ... not a set-up." The reported figure of 36 dead made the ambush the single deadliest war-related incident in Kosovo since the truce took effect two months before. Eight KLA fighters had been killed near the site of the ambush just eleven days prior.

== Aftermath ==
According to Albanian journalists, villages near the ambush site remained sealed off by Yugoslav forces for the remainder of the day. Within hours of the ambush, the KLA vowed revenge. That evening, suspected KLA gunmen entered a Serb-owned café in Peja and opened fire on the patrons, killing six Serb youths. Western diplomats suspected that the attack was carried out by the KLA in retribution for the ambush. The KLA denied responsibility; the journalist Tim Judah suggests that the attack may have been carried out by a rogue unit. The shooting appalled foreign emissaries, and at a meeting with Milošević the following day, Holbrooke condemned it as an act of terrorism and described the situation in Kosovo as "very grave". Milošević issued a separate statement accusing the international community of failing to prevent attacks on Serb civilians, stating: "The terrorist gangs have not ceased attacking the army, the police, and inhabitants of Kosovo."

The VJ continued pursuing remnants of the rebel group for most of December 15, and foreign reporters noted shelling near the ambush site through much of the day. After mediation by the International Committee of the Red Cross (ICRC), Yugoslav authorities handed the bodies of 33 militants over to the KLA for burial. The militants were given heroes' funerals in the rebel-held village of Poljance, on a field dubbed the "Tomb of Heroes", about 61 kilometres (38 mi) northwest of Pristina. The funerals were attended by several thousand Albanians, including about 500 militants.

The captured militants were initially taken to a jail in Prizren and later transported to a military prison in Niš. On January 8, 1999, the KLA ambushed a convoy carrying rations to VJ personnel in Mitrovica, taking eight Yugoslav soldiers hostage. U.S. officials negotiated the soldiers' release five days later. In return, on January 23, Yugoslav authorities freed the nine militants. Almost simultaneously, the KLA released five elderly Serb civilians that it had taken hostage two days earlier. Yugoslav officials insisted that the two events were not linked. The KLA's taking of civilian hostages drew condemnation from Western diplomats, including the head of the KVM, William Walker, who told reporters: "... I think it was a very unwise and uncivilized thing for them to do to kidnap civilians." Upon being released, the militants alleged they were mistreated and beaten while in custody and vowed to avenge the deaths of their fellow fighters.

== See also ==
- April 23, 1998 Albanian–Yugoslav border ambush
- July 18, 1998 Albanian–Yugoslav border clashes
