= Shaul Shay =

Israeli military historian

- שאול שי
- Born: 1955
- Education: Bar-Ilan University
- Occupations: Senior research fellow Military historian

Shaul Shay (Hebrew: שאול שי; born 1955) is a military historian and former deputy head of the National Security Council of Israel.

Shay served 27 years in the Israeli Defence Forces (IDF) as a paratrooper officer and in the military intelligence. In the 1973 war he served as a paratrooper and in the first Lebanon war in 1982 he was the G2 of an armor brigade. In the 1990s, he served as the head of counter terror branch and the intelligence officer of the Southern Command.

In the years 2000 – 2007, Dr Shay was the head of the IDF Military History Department.

From 2007 to 2009, he was the deputy head of the National Security Council (NSC) of Israel.

Shaul Shay holds B.A, M.A. and Ph.D. degrees from Bar-Ilan University and he is a lecturer in the Interdisciplinary Center, Herzeliya (IDC). He is a senior research fellow at the International Policy Institute for counter Terrorism (ICT) and former Director of Research at the Institute for Strategy and Policy (IPS) at the Interdisciplinary Center in Herzliya, Israel.

== Legal issues ==
In June 2008 the Israeli Military Prosecutor filed an indictment against Shay, accusing him of fraud and breach of trust during his tenure as head of the IDF Military History Department (2003–2007). According to media reports, he allegedly used army resources and required subordinates to assist in his private academic and publishing work while employed as a civilian in the IDF.

Earlier, in February 2008, Haaretz reported that Shay had been under investigation after allegedly instructing IDF soldiers to help write his books and articles.

== Publications ==
Shay is the author of twenty books on terrorism, military history and geostrategy, including:

- The Endless Jihad, the Mujahidin, the Taliban and Ben Laden, Transaction Publishers, Rutgers University, State University of New Jersey, 2002.
- The Globalization of Terror, The Challenge of Al-Qaida and the Response of the International Community, Transaction Publishers, Rutgers University, State University of New Jersey, 2003.
- The Shahids, the Islam and the suicide attacks, Transaction Publishers, Rutgers University, State University of New Jersey, 2004.
- The Axis of Evil, Iran, Hizballah and the Palestinian Terror, Transaction Publishers, Rutgers University, State University of New Jersey, 2005.
- The Terror Triangle of the Red sea, Yemen, Sudan and Somalia, Transaction Publishers, Rutgers University, State University of New Jersey, 2005.
- The Islamic Terror and the Balkans, Transaction Publishers, Rutgers University, State University of New Jersey, 2006.
- Islamic Terror Abductions in the Middle East, Sussex Academic Publishers, Brighton, U.K., 2007.
- Somalia between Jihad and Restoration, Transaction Publishers, Rutgers University, State University of New Jersey, 2008.
- The global jihad and the tactic of terror abductions, Sussex Academic Publishers, Brighton, U.K., 2013.
- Somalia in transition, Transaction Publishers, Rutgers University, State University of New Jersey, 2014.
- Israel and Islamic terror abductions 1986 – 2016, Sussex Academic Publishers, Brighton, U.K., 2017.
- The Red sea region between war and reconciliation, Sussex Academic Publishers, Brighton, U.K., 2019.
