= Ranilug incident (1999) =

Incident during 1999

Coordinates: 42°46′N 20°49′E

- Part of The Aftermath of the Kosovo War
Date	6 September 1999
Location	Near Ranilug, Kosovo
Result	Russian-KFOR victory

Belligerents
Kosovo Force: Russia	Serbian gunmen

Commanders and leaders
(Russia) Unknown	Unorganized

Strength
(Russia) 1 Patrol	3 armed gunmen

Casualties and losses
(Russia) None	All 3 killed
- (Republic of Kosova) 1 civilian killed and 2 injured

The Ranilug incident was a confrontation which occurred on 6 September 1999 between Russian Kosovo Force (KFOR) peacekeepers and Serbian gunmen who had attacked a vehicle with Albanian civilians, near the village of Ranilug.

Russian troops shot and killed three Serbian gunmen. One of the occupants in the vehicle was also killed by the gunmen. At the time, it was the bloodiest incident since the entry of KFOR into Kosovo following the end of the Kosovo War.

== Background ==
On 12 June 1999, Kosovo Force (KFOR), a NATO peacekeeping force was deployed to Kosovo following the withdrawal of Yugoslav forces, which brought about an end to the Kosovo War.

In the month of June, there were several incidents involving KFOR forces. On 12 June, Russian troops occupied Pristina International Airport, resulting in a stand-off with NATO forces over deployment plans, which was ultimately resolved the following month. On 13 June, German KFOR troops shot Serb militants, one of whom was killed on the spot and the other died of his injuries, and on 23 June, a clash between U.S. marines from KFOR and armed Serbs in the village of Zhegër resulted in the death of one of the gunmen.

== Incident ==
On 6 September 1999, while driving through the highway near the village of Ranilug, a Russian KFOR patrol spotted three Serbian gunmen armed with rifles who had attacked a car carrying five ethnic Albanians. The gunmen killed one of the occupants and wounded two; the other two managed to flee. When Russian troops rushed to the scene, they were fired upon by the gunmen. Russian troops fired back, killing all three of the gunmen. At the time, it was the bloodiest incident since the entry of KFOR into Kosovo following the end of the war. While all 3 gunmen were neutralized, the Russian KFOR did not suffer any casualties, with only one bulletproof vest being damaged after it was struck with a bullet, however the soldier wearing the vest remained unharmed.

== Aftermath ==
NATO Secretary-General Javier Solana visited Pristina the following day and stated that the actions of the Russian troops proved that they were behaving "according to the obligation that all KFOR troops have". NATO lauded Russian forces for not showing "Slavic bias". Albanians had been hostile to the implementation of Russian peacekeepers due to Russia's historical ties with Serbia and Russian volunteers aiding Serbs during the war. Following the incident, a previous blockade that Albanians had formed on 23 August in southern Orahovac to blockade Russian peacekeepers, which had led to a tense standoff, was removed.

== See also ==
- Prizren incident (1999)
- Zhegër incident (1999)
- NATO bombing of Yugoslavia
- Operation Kinetic (1999)
- Operation Echo
- Incident at Pristina airport
