= Zegra incident =

European military confrontation

- Part of the aftermath of the Kosovo War
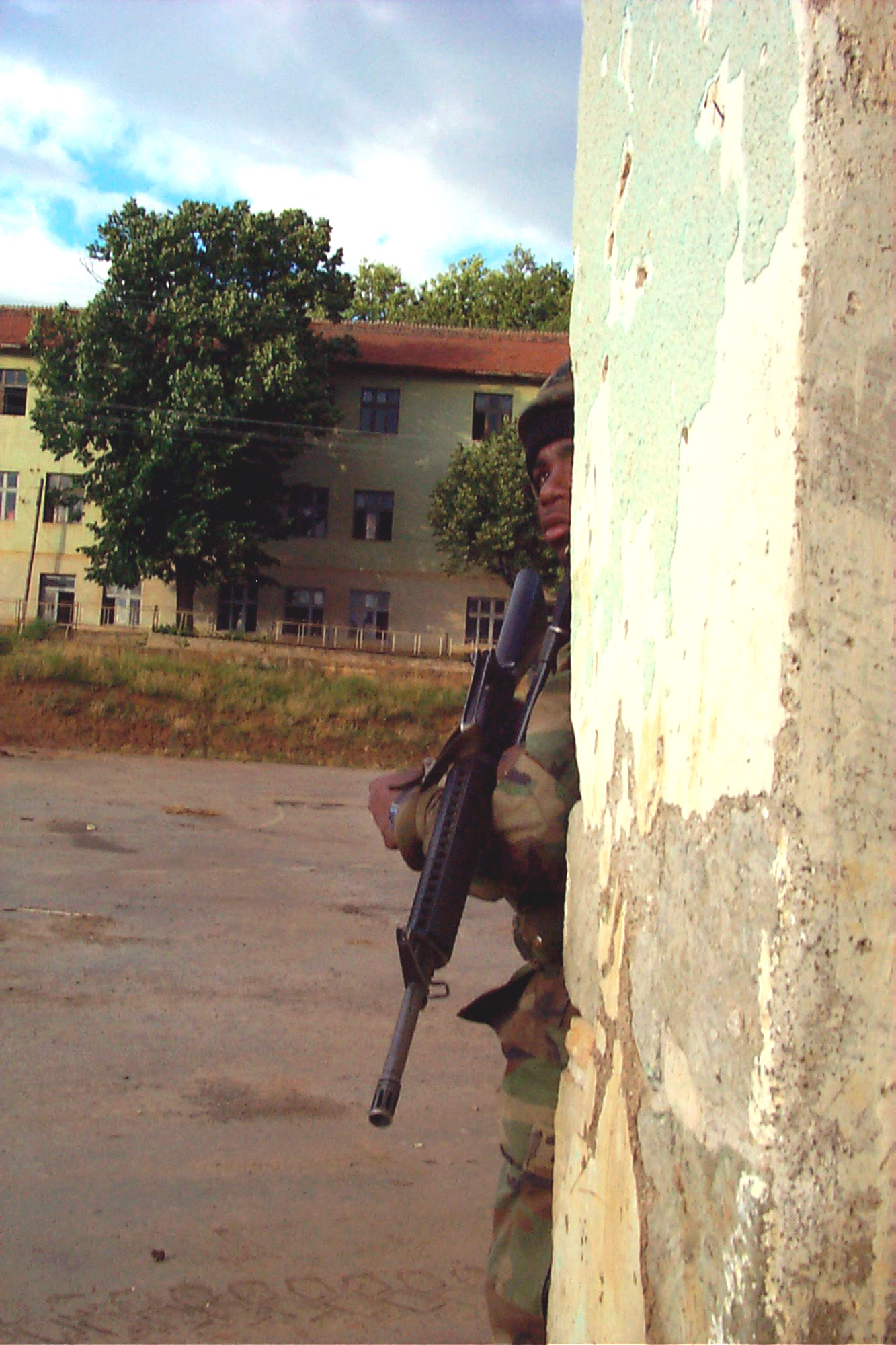
- U.S. Marine from the 26th Marine Expeditionary Unit prepares to return fire after his unit was shot at by Serb snipers at a checkpoint in Zegra on June 23, 1999.
Date	23 June 1999
Location	Zegra, Gnjilane, Yugoslavia (now Zhegër, Gjilani, Kosovo)
Result	KFOR victory; KFOR troops secure Zegra

Belligerents
NATO; Kosovo Force; United States	Serb militants

Commanders and leaders
(United States) General Wesley Clark (United States) General John Craddock (United States) Colonel Kenneth Glueck	Unknown

Units involved
U.S. Marine Corps; 26th Marine Expeditionary Unit; 2nd Light Armored Reconnaissance Battalion	Unknown

Strength
Unknown	6 men

Casualties and losses
None	3 killed 2 wounded 1 captured

A clash between U.S. Marines from the Kosovo Force (KFOR) and armed Serbs in the village of Zegra (or Zhegër) occurred on 23 June 1999, during NATO's peacekeeping mission in Kosovo, known as Operation Joint Guardian. The incident occurred when U.S. Marines from the 26th Marine Expeditionary Unit (MEU), were attacked by gunmen at a checkpoint in the village of Zegra, located southeast of Gnjilane, Kosovo.

== Background ==
The incident unfolded less than two weeks after NATO forces entered Kosovo on June 12, 1999, following the cessation of the NATO bombing campaign that ended the conflict between Yugoslav forces and the Kosovo Liberation Army (KLA). Kosovo had experienced widespread ethnic violence and atrocities during the conflict, with the Yugoslav Army and Serbian paramilitaries driving hundreds of thousands of ethnic Albanians from their homes. After the withdrawal of Yugoslav troops, KFOR was tasked with ensuring security, facilitating the return of refugees, and preventing reprisals between ethnic Serbs and Albanians.

By mid-June, U.S. forces, particularly the 26th Marine Expeditionary Unit, had established a presence in southeastern Kosovo (Karadak), manning checkpoints and disarming militias, including the Kosovo Liberation Army. Tensions remained high between the remaining Serbs in the area and returning Albanian refugees, leading to occasional violent confrontations. In the days leading up to the firefight, U.S. Marines had been working to disarm illegal checkpoints set up by KLA fighters who were slow to comply with the demilitarization agreement. Meanwhile, NATO forces were also dealing with scattered instances of Serb civilian resistance, as well as reprisal attacks by returning Albanians on Serb settlements. 10 days before, German troops battled Yugoslav Army stragglers in Prizren. In a nearby village, ethnic Albanians looted and burned Serb homes after their residents fled. French KFOR units stationed in the northern city of Mitrovica faced similar difficulties, as they attempted to keep peace between Serb and Albanian residents amid rising ethnic tensions.

== Incident ==
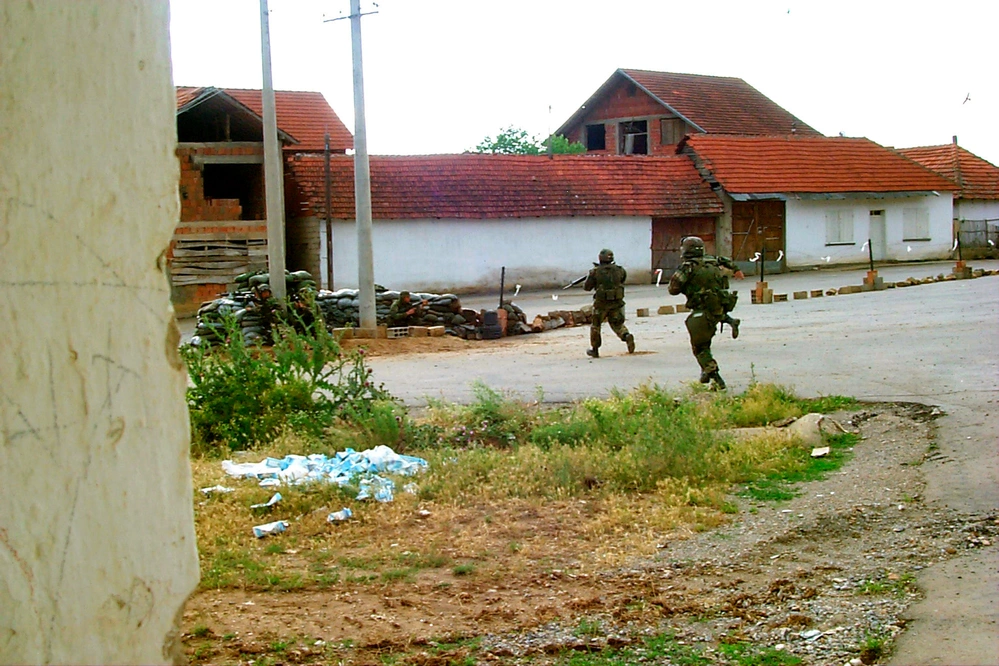
U.S. Marines run for cover at a bunker after being shot at

On the evening of June 23, 1999, U.S. Marines were stationed at a checkpoint near Zegra when they came under fire from six gunmen. The attackers, later identified as Serb militants in civilian clothes, used AK-47 assault rifles and immediately engaged the Marines in a firefight. The U.S. Marines responded swiftly, calling in reinforcements, including armored vehicles and Cobra attack helicopters, to contain the situation.

The gunmen retreated to a nearby house, where they barricaded themselves for several hours. Using megaphones and Serbo-Croatian interpreters, the Marines attempted to negotiate a peaceful surrender. However, after a two-hour standoff, U.S. Marines stormed the building. In the ensuing battle, three attackers were killed, and two others were wounded. The wounded were evacuated to a U.S. military hospital, where one of them was operated on due to severe injuries. A fourth gunman was detained, while some reports suggested that additional assailants might have escaped into the surrounding area.

No U.S. casualties were reported during the incident, and the attackers' exact identities remained unconfirmed, though they were suspected to be Serbs opposed to KFOR's presence.

== Aftermath ==
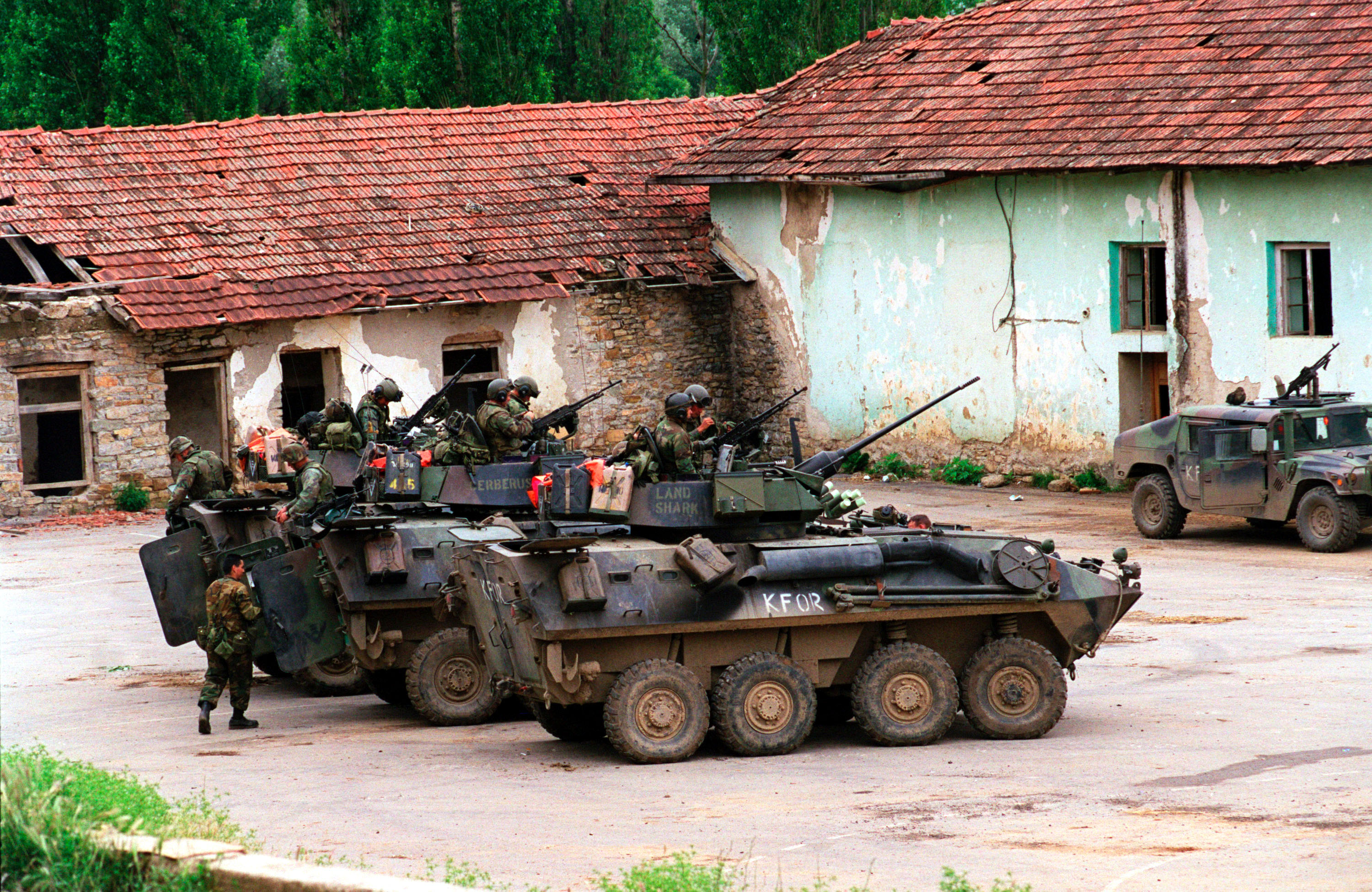
Marines from the 2nd Light Armored Reconnaissance Battalion in Zegra 4 days after the battle.

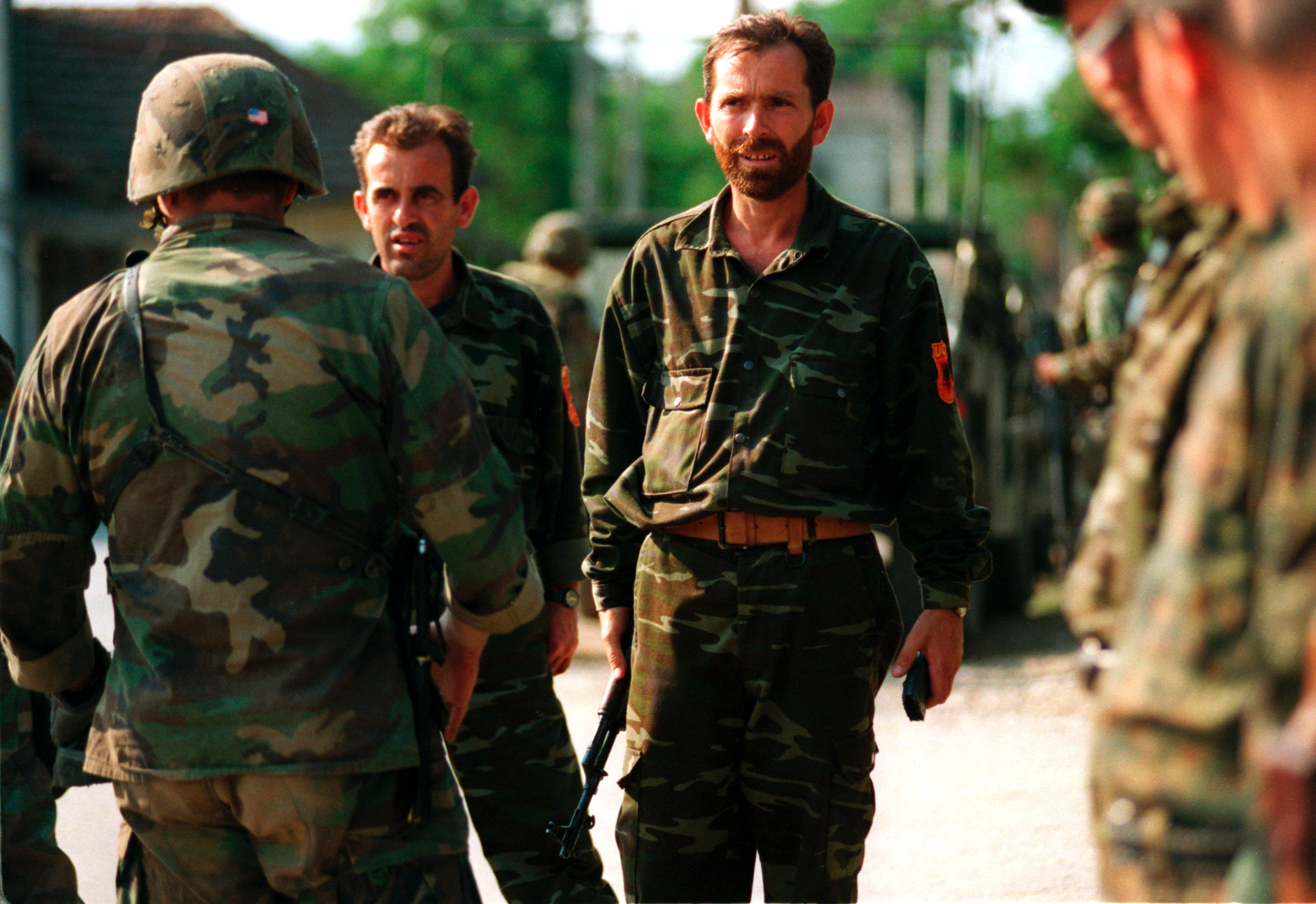
Members of the Kosovo Liberation Army stand in formation to turn over their weapons to U.S. Marines from the 26th Marine Expeditionary Unit in the village of Zegra, on 30 June 1999, 7 days after the incident.

Following the Zegra incident, U.S. military officials conducted an investigation but chose not to escalate aggressive operations to root out weapons caches in the area. Colonel Kenneth Glueck, the commanding officer of the 26th MEU, stated that while military police would investigate the attack, the Marines would not conduct house-to-house searches for weapons unless specific intelligence guided them. A day later, on June 24, 1999, in Zegra, ethnic Albanians looted and set fire to the property of Serbs who had fled the area. The Serbs were escorted out of the village by American NATO troops amidst the unrest. The broader mission in Kosovo remained focused on ensuring the safety of returning refugees and maintaining the fragile peace between ethnic groups. U.S. brigadier general John Craddock, the commander of Task Force Falcon, which was responsible for the American sector in Kosovo, described the incident as part of a larger challenge posed by groups unwilling to accept the new peace agreement. These "rogue elements" were present on both the Serb and Albanian sides, and NATO forces had to balance their efforts to protect all ethnic groups while maintaining neutrality. Months later, Russian KFOR troops battled Serb gunmen in Ranilug.
