= Radoniq lake =

Lake in Kosovo

Radoniq Lake
- Lake Radonjić
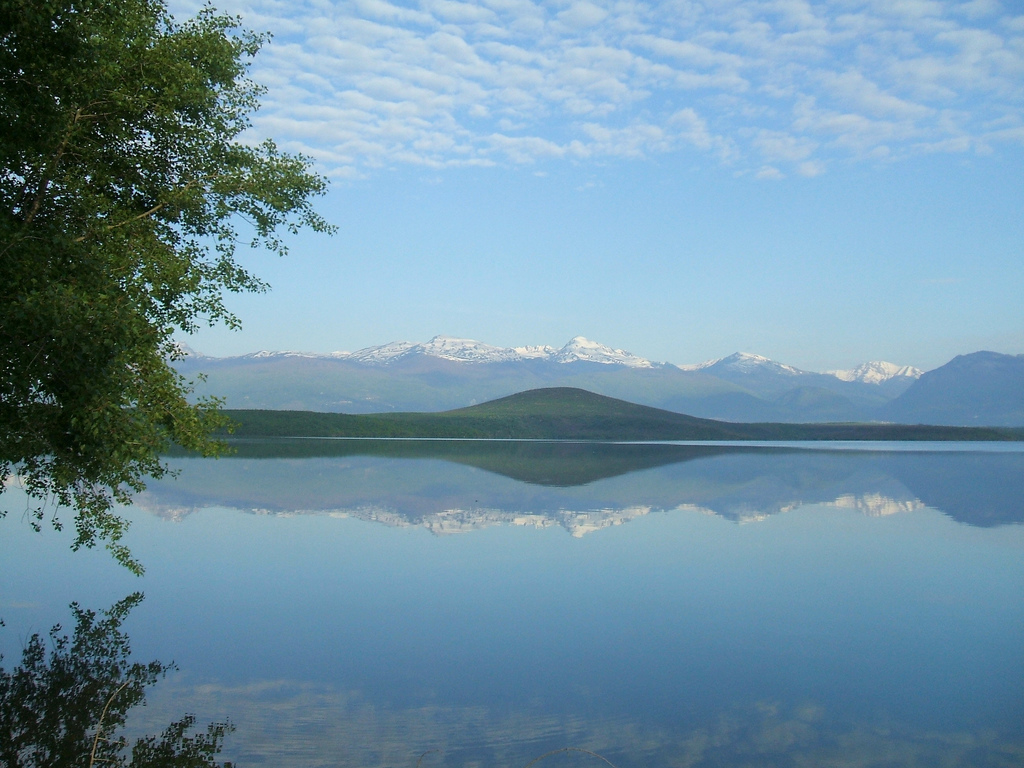
- Radoniq Lake and the Accursed Mountains in the background

- Location within Kosovo Location within Europe
- Location: Kosovo
- Coordinates: 42°29′15″N 20°25′05″E
- Primary outflows: Bistrica
- Max. length: 4.7 km (2.9 mi)
- Max. width: 2.2 km (1.4 mi)
- Surface area: 5.96 km^{2} (2.30 sq mi)
- Average depth: 15 m (49 ft)
- Max. depth: 30 m (98 ft)
- Residence time: 30 years
- Surface elevation: 455 m (1,493 ft)
- Islands: 0

Radoniq Lake (Albanian: Liqeni i Radoniqit; Serbian: Радоњићко језеро/Radonjićko jezero) is a lake in Kosovo. After Gazivoda Lake, it is the second largest in the country at 5.62 km^{2}.

Before the lake was created in the 1980s, there was a village here, named Radoniq. The lake started to be filled with water in March 1983, supplied by the rivers Lumbardhi i Deçanit and Përrua i Ratishit.

In 1998, the lake was the site of the Lake Radonjić massacre.

== See also ==
- List of lakes of Kosovo
