= Ambush near Kosovska Mitrovica =

1999 clash during the Kosovo War

Ambush near Mitrovica
- Part of the Kosovo War
Date	8 January 1999
Location	Bare, Mitrovica, FR Yugoslavia
Result	KLA victory

Belligerents
Kosovo Liberation Army	Federal Republic of Yugoslavia

Units involved
141st Brigade “Mehë Uka”	Yugoslav Army

Casualties and losses
unknown	3 killed 1 wounded 8 captured (later released)

The Ambush near Mitrovica (Serbian: Zaseda kod Kosovske Mitrovice; Albanian: Prita afër Mitrovicës) was an incident that occurred on 8 January 1999, when members of the Kosovo Liberation Army (KLA) ambushed a Yugoslav Interior Ministry convoy carrying rations to troops stationed in a field near Mitrovica. Later that evening, two columns of Yugoslav troops, accompanied with at least fifty tanks, set off in the direction of Mitrovica. The Yugoslav troops told journalists that they were heading toward the area where the captive troops were thought to be held.

== Background ==
In 1992–1993, ethnic Albanians created the KLA which started attacking Yugoslavian police forces and secret-service officials who abused Albanian civilians in 1995. Starting in 1998, the KLA was involved in frontal battle, with increasing numbers of Yugoslav security forces. Escalating tensions led to the Kosovo War in February 1998. The shelling of the village of Slapužane by Yugoslav troops triggered the ambush by KLA forces.

== Incident ==
On 8 January, soldiers of the KLA attacked and ambushed a Yugoslav convoy heading for Kosovska Mitrovica in the village Bare in the region Shala e Bajgorës. The KLA killed three Serb policemen, wounded one, and captured eight other policemen.

== Aftermath ==
Talks between the Serbs and the KLA on the release of the captured soldiers were conducted in the village of Stari Trg. The ambush led to renewed fighting in the Podujevë area. The KLA followed up the ambush with another attack on a Serbian police patrol near the village of Slivovo, killing one police officer. The village of Račak served as the staging area for these ambushes, resulting in a significant build up of Yugoslav Army forces and subsequent massacre in the village.
