= December 3, 1998, Albanian–Yugoslav border clash =

3 December 1998 Albanian–Yugoslav border clash
- Part of the Kosovo War
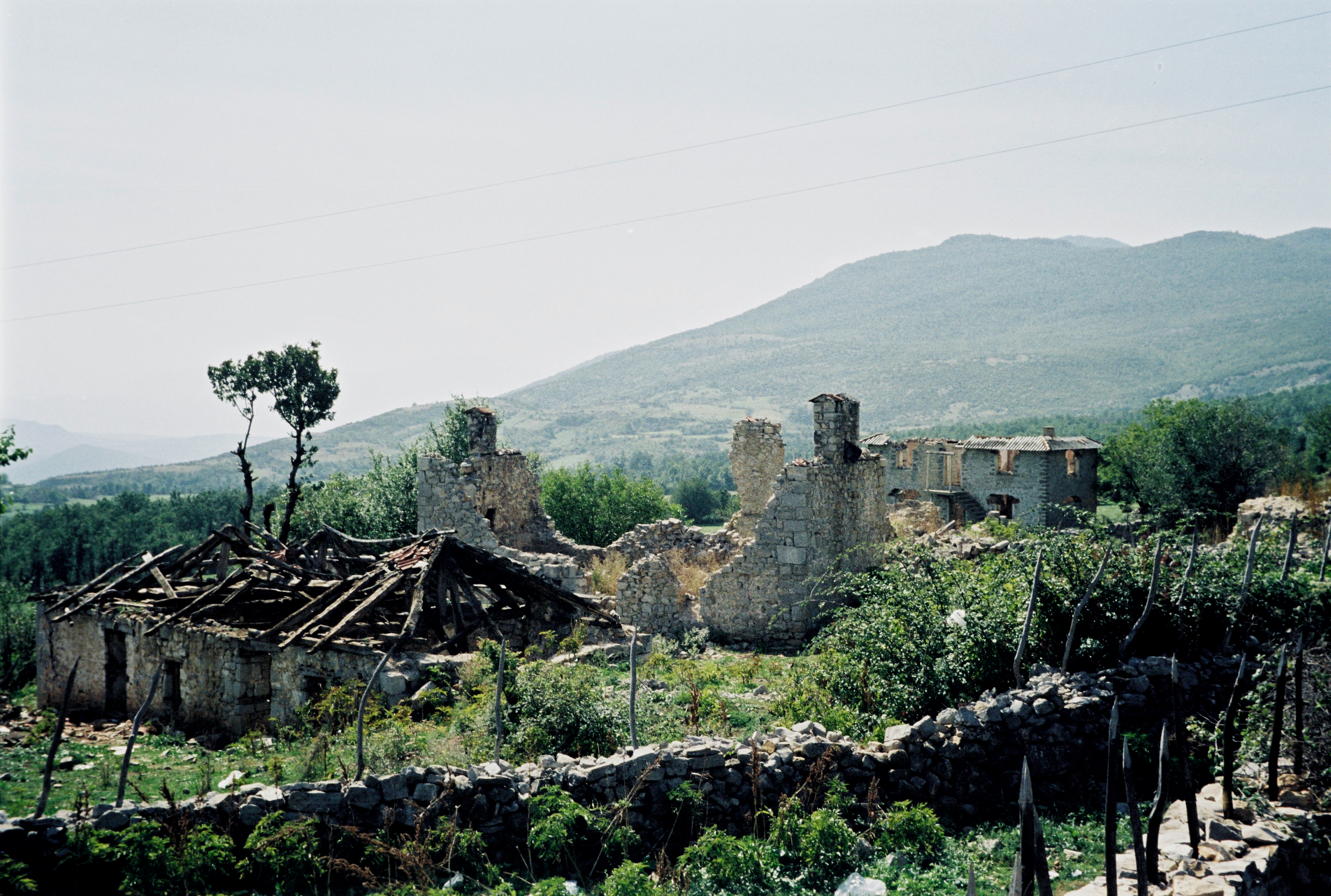
- A section of the Albanian–Yugoslav border, 2001
Date	3 December 1998
Location	Albanian–Yugoslav border
Result	Yugoslav victory

Belligerents
FR Yugoslavia	Kosovo Liberation Army

Commanders and leaders
Unknown	Skënder Hameli †; Muhamet Malësori †; Hysni Duraku †; Sedat Hyda †; Sinan Hoti †

Strength
Unknown	9 militants

Casualties and losses
None	8 killed

On 3 December 1998, a Yugoslav border patrol was attacked by a group of nine Kosovo Liberation Army (KLA) attempting to illegally cross the border between Albania and Yugoslavia. Eight militants were killed in the ensuing exchange, while the border patrol suffered no casualties. This was the most serious armed incident in Kosovo since a truce between the KLA and the Yugoslav security forces that had taken effect that October.

== Background ==
In 1989, Belgrade abolished self-rule in Serbia's two autonomous provinces, Vojvodina and Kosovo. Kosovo, a province inhabited predominantly by ethnic Albanians, was of great historical and cultural significance to Serbs, who had formed a majority there before the mid-19th century, but by 1990 represented only about 10 percent of the population. Alarmed by their dwindling numbers, the province's Serbs began to fear that they were being "squeezed out" by the Albanians, and ethnic tensions worsened. As soon as Kosovo's autonomy was abolished, a minority government run by Serbs and Montenegrins was appointed by Serbian President Slobodan Milošević to oversee the province, enforced by thousands of heavily armed paramilitaries from Serbia-proper. Albanian-language newspapers, television and radio stations were shut down, as were Albanian-language schools and colleges. All of the Albanian professors at the University of Pristina lost their jobs, as did hundreds of thousands of other Albanians working in state-owned companies.

In 1996, a group of Albanian nationalists calling themselves the Kosovo Liberation Army (KLA) began attacking the Yugoslav Army (Serbo-Croatian Latin: Vojska Jugoslavije; VJ) and the Serbian Ministry of Internal Affairs (Serbo-Croatian Latin: Ministarstvo unutrašnjih poslova; MUP) in Kosovo, with the goal of separating the province from the rest of Yugoslavia, which by then was just a rump federation consisting of Serbia and Montenegro. At first, the KLA carried out hit-and-run attacks—31 in 1996, 55 in 1997, and 66 in January and February 1998 alone. It quickly gained popularity among young Kosovo Albanians, many of whom rejected the non-violent resistance to Yugoslav authorities advocated by the politician Ibrahim Rugova and favoured a more aggressive approach. The organization received a significant boost in 1997, when an armed uprising in neighbouring Albania led to thousands of weapons from the Albanian Army's depots being looted. Many of these weapons ended up in the hands of the KLA, which already had substantial resources due its involvement in the trafficking of drugs, weapons and people, as well as through donations from the Albanian diaspora. The group's popularity skyrocketed after the VJ and MUP attacked the compound of KLA leader Adem Jashari in March 1998, killing him, his closest associates and most of his family. The attack motivated thousands of young Kosovo Albanians to join the ranks of the KLA, fueling the Kosovar uprising that eventually erupted in the spring of 1998.

The Kosovo conflict escalated over the summer of 1998. In October, Milošević and U.S. envoy Richard Holbrooke reached an agreement to temporarily end the fighting. The agreement came after Holbrooke convinced the KLA to consider negotiations with Belgrade while making it clear to Milošević that failing to find a peaceful solution to the conflict would lead to a NATO bombing campaign against Serbia. By December, over 1,000 people had been killed and more than 300,000 displaced.

== Clash ==
According to Yugoslav officials, nine Albanian militants who were illegally attempting to enter Yugoslavia opened fire on a group of border guards early in the morning of 3 December. Eight of the militants were killed in the ensuing shootout. The border guards did not suffer any casualties. Albanian sources identified the fallen KLA militants as Skënder Hameli (from Prizren), Muhamet Malësori, Hysni Duraku, and Isak, Ismet, Sedat Hyda and Sinan Hoti (all from Rahovec). Their bodies were recovered by Yugoslav authorities, and later taken to a Prizren morgue so that autopsies could be performed. With the post-mortems complete, the militants' bodies were handed over to their families, and were buried the following day in their native villages.

This was the most serious armed incident between the forces of Yugoslav President Slobodan Milošević and the KLA since a truce had been negotiated a month and a half earlier. Less than two weeks later, another altercation took place near the site of the clash, this time a Yugoslav Army ambush in which more than 30 KLA militants were killed.
