= Prizren incident =

European military confrontation

- Part of the aftermath of the Kosovo War
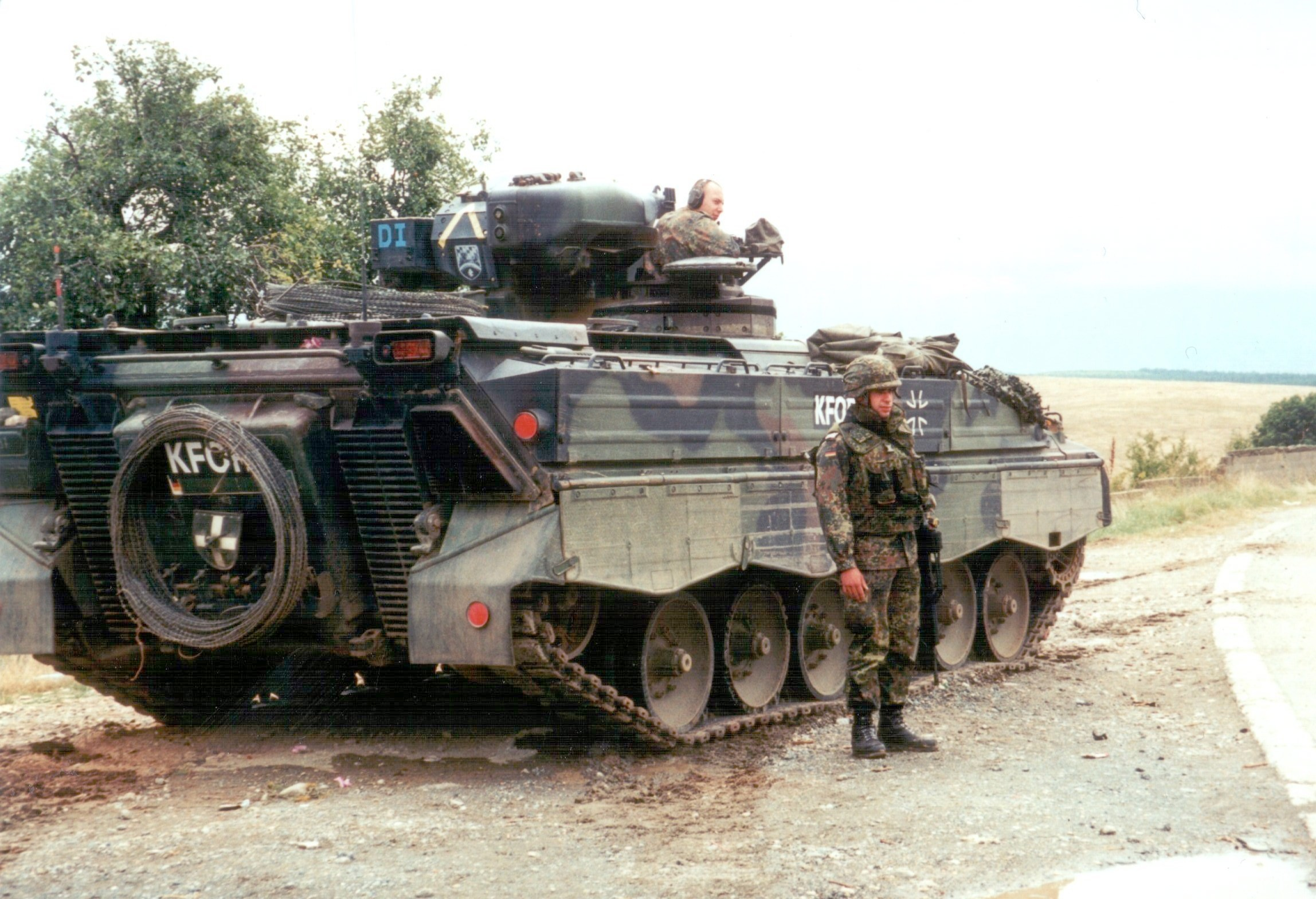
- German Marder IFV and personnel in Kosovo (1999)
Date	13 June 1999
Location	Prizren, Yugoslavia (now Kosovo) 42°12′34.92″N 20°44′29″E
Result	KFOR victory; KFOR troops secure Prizren

Belligerents
Kosovo Force; German Army	(Serbia and Montenegro) Yugoslav Army stragglers

Commanders and leaders
(Germany) Fritz von Korff	(Serbia and Montenegro) Nebojša Pavković

Strength
700 troops	Unknown

Casualties and losses
1 wounded	2 killed
- 1 civilian wounded
- Location within Kosovo Prizren incident (Serbia) Prizren incident (Serbia and Montenegro)

The Prizren incident was a confrontation between German Kosovo Force (KFOR) troops advancing into Kosovo and stragglers from the withdrawing Yugoslav Army. The shootout took place in the city of Prizren, on 13 June 1999. The German troops killed one armed Serb on the spot, while another one died of wounds later. A German soldier was injured by return fire, and there were reports of a woman wounded by Serb snipers.

== Background ==
On 12 June 1999, two days after the approval of UN Security Council Resolution 1244, Kosovo Force (KFOR) personnel began to arrive in Kosovo to stop further hostilities between ethnic Albanians and Serbs and to coordinate efforts to secure the distribution of humanitarian aid.

=== Arrival of the German troops ===
In the early hours of 13 June about 100 German soldiers arrived in Prizren from North Macedonia to secure the city for another 600 incoming troops that entered at afternoon from Albania, 10 miles (16 km) to the west. Earlier, a Yugoslav Army outpost at Vrbnica border crossing, recently vacated by 60 soldiers, was looted and vandalized. The German soldiers were received as liberators by the ethnic Albanian inhabitants. One of their first tasks was to separate a crowd of Kosovar Albanian civilians and Yugoslav troops by forming a human line, after the former pelted a convoy of Kosovar Serb civilians leaving the city. There was a tense standoff, but eventually a German officer managed to convince the Serbs to withdraw. At the Morinë border crossing, German troops compelled the Serbs to leave the outpost according to schedule when the latter tried to win more time.

== Shooting incident ==
As the German troops drove into downtown, along the Bistrica river, they were met by sniper fire from one of the surrounding hills and some houses; they were also allegedly fired at from a Roman Catholic church. The soldiers took cover and returned fire. A civilian woman was reportedly wounded by the snipers, however this was never officially confirmed, while the German troops moved to defensive positions below the hill. A German fighting vehicle fired a warning burst with a general-purpose Rheinmetall MG 3 machine gun at a passing Yugoslav army truck after a Yugoslav soldier inside brandished an AK-47 assault rifle at a jeering Albanian crowd and fired two shots in the air.

At dusk, a yellow Zastava 125pz civilian-type vehicle was seen approaching a German armored carrier outside Hotel Theranda, in the center of the city. According to German reports, the passenger produced an AK-47 and opened fire at the carrier and at bystanders, who fled for safety. The German soldiers in the armored vehicle, supported by a Leopard 2 tank that mounted a roadblock, shot back. Three paratroopers fired at the car with their Heckler & Koch G36 assault rifles, joined by a non-commissioned officer with his 9mm pistol and by turret-mounted 7.62mm machine guns. The combined gunfire killed the driver instantly and critically wounded the shooter. A German soldier in the armored carrier was injured in the arm, becoming the first casualty of the overall peacekeeping operation. The Germans fired a total of 180 rifle rounds and 40 machine-gun rounds. The German firepower was so intense that it pushed the car backward. The passenger eventually died of his wounds. The shooting lasted 20 minutes. The Germans said that the two individuals in the car, both Serbs, were carrying grenades and semi-automatic weapons.

According to the Serbian version of the incident, the German Army committed a war crime by killing two Serbs who were fleeing an angry mob of Albanian civilians and members of the KLA. The two men who were killed were Žarko Andrijević from Prizren (a doorman at "Kosovo-vinu") and Slavko Veselinovic (a refugee from Bosnia and worker at an "electrical distribution company").

Platoon leader Lieutenant David Ferk, who gave the order to fire back, was awarded the Gold Cross of Honour for Outstanding Deeds by German Minister of Defense Rudolf Scharping.

== Aftermath ==
The commander of the KFOR brigade in Prizren, General Fritz von Korff said: "Although we may not have everything under control at present, we have enough presence in the town to believe there will be a safe (Yugoslav) withdrawal." He also warned that Prizren was still a "dangerous place".

Armed Serb civilians set an improvised checkpoint outside the town, but it was largely ignored by the Germans, who passed through it several times. The retreating Yugoslav army personnel also manned a number of checkpoints, in violation of the agreement reached with NATO. More than ten days into the arrival of KFOR troops, turmoil and killings among the civilian population continued to spread, to the point that the German commander imposed a curfew from midnight until 5 a.m.

There were no further incidents with Yugoslav forces, although a Leopard 2A5 tank fired four warning rounds at the town of Orahovac when unrest broke out there on 26 June 1999.

The Prizren incident was subsequently referred to by German troops as "Bloody Sunday".

== See also ==
- Battle of Tetovo
- Kosovo War
- North Kosovo crisis (2011–2013)
- United Nations Interim Administration Mission in Kosovo
- Ranilug incident (1999)
- Zhegër incident (1999)
