= April 23, 1998, Albanian–Yugoslav border ambush =

- Part of the Kosovo War
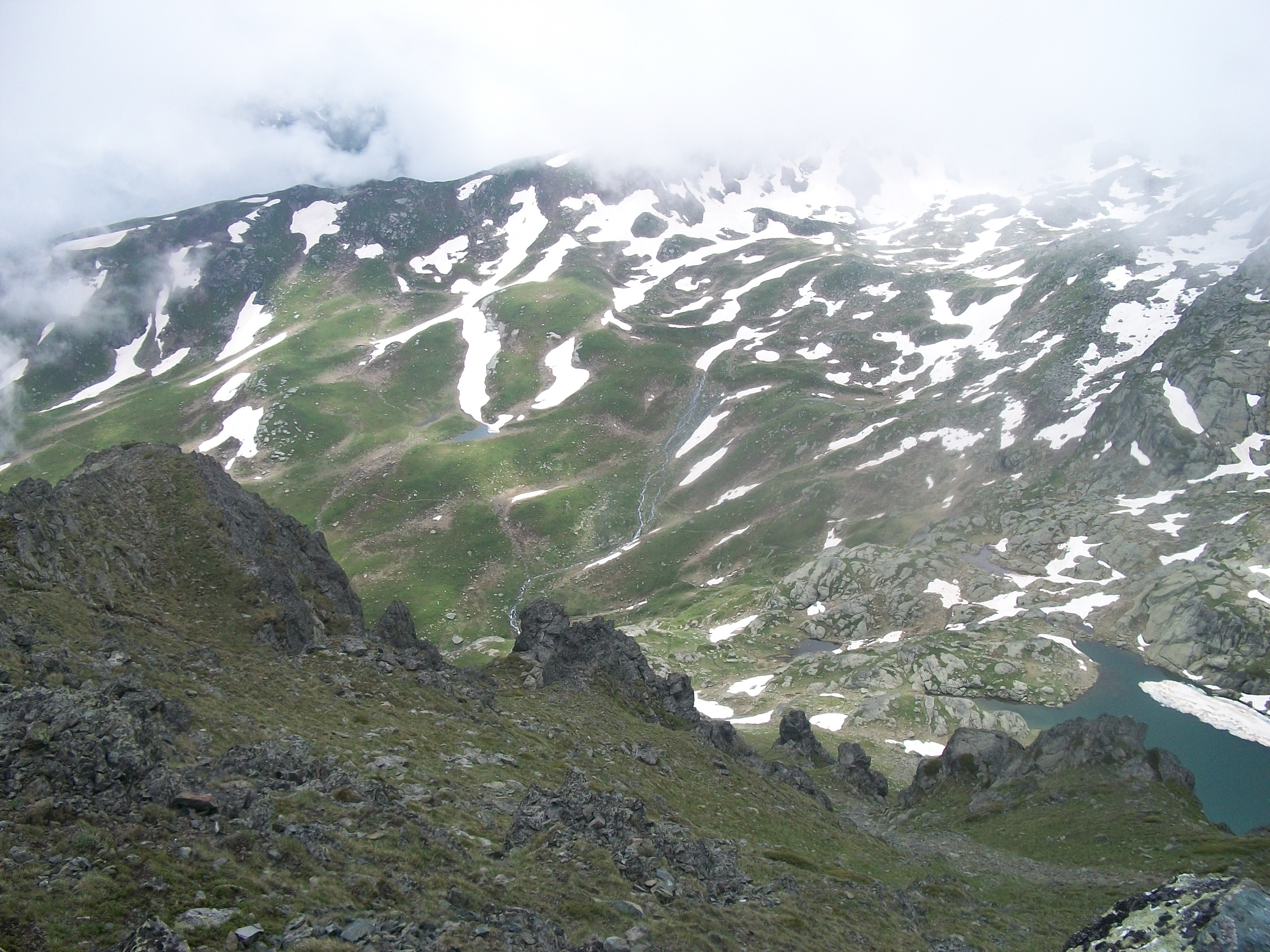
- View of the mountains west of Deçan
Date	April 23, 1998
Location	Albanian–Yugoslav border 42.533611°N 20.14°E
Result	Yugoslav victory

Belligerents
FR Yugoslavia	Kosovo Liberation Army

Commanders and leaders
Božidar Delić	Unknown

Units involved
53rd Border Battalion	Unknown

Strength
Unknown	150–200 militants

Casualties and losses
None	19 killed 1 wounded 2 captured
- Location of Mount Gjeravica in Kosovo

On the morning of April 23, 1998, a band of Kosovo Liberation Army (KLA) fighters was ambushed by a group of Yugoslav Army (VJ) border guards near the Košare outpost, just west of Deçan. The fighters had been trying to smuggle weapons and supplies into Kosovo via northern Albania. Nineteen were killed in the ensuing attack, and a further two were captured. The VJ did not sustain any casualties. Some of the militants retreated back to Albania, while others managed to break through the ambush and make it past the Yugoslav border, into Kosovo. Following the clash, the VJ confiscated a large quantity of arms that the militants had been transporting.

Villagers in northern Albania and western Kosovo reported hearing explosions in the vicinity of the ambush and seeing helicopters flying overhead for much of the following day. Albanian officials later alleged that two of these helicopters had violated the country's airspace, and Albania moved elite army units to the Yugoslav border in response. Yugoslav authorities accused Albania of backing the KLA. In response to the ambush, U.S. officials indicated that they would push for sanctions to be re-implemented against Yugoslavia, and said they would look to freeze the country's assets overseas. Some Albanian sources alleged that the men had not been ambushed, rather they were abducted and killed by Yugoslav security forces. Such claims could not be verified by Western journalists, and later that year, Amnesty International affirmed that the men were killed in an ambush while smuggling weapons across the border.

== Background ==
Following World War II, Kosovo was given the status of an autonomous province within the Socialist Republic of Serbia, one of six constitutional republics of the Socialist Federal Republic of Yugoslavia. After the death of Yugoslavia's long-time leader Josip Broz Tito in 1980, Yugoslavia's political system began to unravel. In 1989, Belgrade revoked Kosovo's autonomy. Kosovo, a province inhabited predominantly by ethnic Albanians, was of great historical and cultural significance to Serbs. Alarmed by their dwindling numbers, the province's Serbs began to fear that they were being "squeezed out" by the Albanians, and ethnic tensions worsened. As soon as Kosovo's autonomy was abolished, a minority government run by Serbs and Montenegrins was appointed by Serbian President Slobodan Milošević to oversee the province, enforced by thousands of heavily armed paramilitaries from Serbia-proper. Albanian culture was systematically repressed and hundreds of thousands of Albanians working in state-owned companies lost their jobs.

In 1996, a group of Albanian nationalists calling themselves the Kosovo Liberation Army (KLA) began attacking the Yugoslav Army (Serbo-Croatian: Vojska Jugoslavije; VJ) and the Serbian Ministry of Internal Affairs (Serbo-Croatian: Ministarstvo unutrašnjih poslova; MUP) in Kosovo. Their goal was to separate the province from the rest of Yugoslavia, which following the separation of Slovenia, Croatia, Macedonia and Bosnia-Herzegovina in 1991–92, was just a rump federation consisting of Serbia and Montenegro. At first, the KLA carried out hit-and-run attacks (31 in 1996, 55 in 1997, and 66 in January and February 1998 alone). It quickly gained popularity among young Kosovo Albanians, many of whom rejected the non-violent resistance to Yugoslav authorities advocated by the politician Ibrahim Rugova and favoured a more aggressive approach. The organization received a significant boost in 1997, when an armed uprising in neighbouring Albania led to thousands of weapons from the Albanian Army's depots being looted. Many of these weapons ended up in the hands of the KLA. Cross-border arms smuggling flourished; the unit charged with securing the Yugoslav border was the 549th Motorized Brigade, under the command of General Božidar Delić.

The KLA's popularity skyrocketed after the VJ and MUP attacked the compound of KLA leader Adem Jashari in March 1998, killing him, his closest associates and most of his family. The attack motivated thousands of young Kosovo Albanians to join the ranks of the KLA, fueling the Kosovar uprising that eventually erupted in the spring of 1998.

== Timeline ==
=== Clash ===
According to Delić, at 05:45 on the morning of April 23, soldiers of the 53rd Border Battalion of the 549th Motorized Brigade encountered a group of 150–200 militants near the Košare outpost attempting to illegally enter Kosovo via northern Albania, just west of Deçan. Rebels had been massing at the Albanian–Yugoslav border for some time in anticipation of a renewed VJ offensive. Yugoslav authorities stated that the militants were "armed infiltrators" who had been undergoing training in military camps in Albania, and were attempting to smuggle weapons into Kosovo. According to Delić, the border patrol was greatly outnumbered by the militants. Armed with howitzers and rocket launchers, the patrol ambushed the armed group, sparking an intense exchange of fire. Clashes reportedly lasted all night, and the Kosovo Albanian residents of the border village of Botushë reported artillery fire and helicopters flying overhead the following day.

The VJ reported suffering no casualties in the clash. Nineteen militants were killed, one was wounded and a further two were captured. It was the single deadliest war-related incident in Kosovo since the attack against Jashari's compound the previous month. Initial reports suggested that anywhere between 16 and 23 militants had been killed. Nine of the fallen militants were from the village of Hereq, near Deçan, about 9.7 kilometres (6.0 mi) from the Albanian border. Delić identified the captured militants as Gazmend Tahiraj (an English professor from Hereq; b. 1970) and Ibër Metaj (an agricultural technician from Hereq; b. 1961). The remaining militants either managed to break through the ambush and reach Kosovo, or fled back to Albania, according to Delić. Footage taken by the military, and later broadcast on Yugoslav television, showed a field strewn with guns, ammunition and the bodies of three militants. The VJ reported seizing 4 tonnes (3.9 long tons; 4.4 short tons) of weapons and ammunition, including 120 cases of landmines.

=== Aftermath ===
During Milošević's trial at the International Criminal Tribunal for the former Yugoslavia, Delić testified that an investigative judge from Niš visited the Košare outpost shortly after fighting had ceased, and conducted an on-site investigation. Journalists were not allowed to visit the site due to "security concerns". On April 24, Western reporters saw VJ personnel digging mortar positions south of Dečani, about 24 kilometres (15 mi) from the Albanian border. The troops said they had been exchanging gunfire with the rebels over the previous two days.

The U.S. State Department acknowledged that it had received reports of "myriad deaths" along the Albanian border. State Department spokesman James Rubin called the situation in Kosovo "quite troubling, extremely dangerous." U.S. officials said they would push for a freeze on Yugoslavia's overseas assets and an international ban on foreign trade with the country in response to the violence. In turn, the Yugoslav military issued a statement requesting that the West put pressure on Kosovo Albanian leaders "to give up and denounce terrorism if they truly wanted a peaceful and political solution to Kosovo's problems." The statement also accused Albania of "training, infiltrating and illegally arming the terrorists," and demanded that the West pressure the country to desist from such activities. Albania denied supporting the KLA insurgency, and alleged that two Yugoslav helicopters had violated its airspace. Yugoslavia denied that there had been any violations. Consequently, the Albanian Army and police were placed on high alert, and the country stationed elite troops along its border.

On April 27, nine of the fallen militants were buried in Erec. Some 400 ethnic Albanians attended their funerals. The dead ranged in age from seventeen to forty-five years old. Villagers claimed that some of the dead had been arrested days before their deaths and thus could not have been ambushed, as the Yugoslav authorities claimed. Such claims could not be independently verified by Western reporters. In a 1998 report, Amnesty International affirmed that the 19 men had been killed in an ambush while trying to smuggle weapons into Kosovo.

== See also ==
- July 18, 1998 Albanian–Yugoslav border clashes
- December 14, 1998 Albanian–Yugoslav border ambush
