= Civilian casualties during Operation Allied Force =

Some of the civilian casualties of the Kosovo War

Many human rights groups criticised civilian casualties resulting from military actions of NATO forces in Operation Allied Force. Both Serbs and Albanians were killed in 90 Human Rights Watch-confirmed incidents in which civilians died as a result of NATO bombing. It reported that as few as 489 and as many as 528 Yugoslav civilians were killed in the NATO airstrikes. Kenneth Roth, the executive director of Human Rights Watch, criticized NATO's decision to bomb civilian infrastructure in the war. "Once it made the decision to attack Yugoslavia, NATO should have done more to protect civilians," Roth remarked. "All too often, NATO targeting subjected the civilian population to unacceptable risks". Yugoslav government estimated that no fewer than 1,200 civilians and up to 2,500 civilians were killed and 5,000 wounded as a result of NATO airstrikes.

From the beginning of Operation Allied Force, NATO pledged to minimise civilian casualties. Consideration of civilian casualties was incorporated into NATO's planning and targeting process. Targets were "looked at in terms of their military significance in relation to the collateral damage or the unintended consequence that might be there", according to General Henry Shelton, Chairman of the Joint Chiefs of Staff. Critics of the campaign have suggested that incidents were the inevitable result of NATO's policy of restricting its pilots to bombing from 15,000 feet or above for the sake of avoiding NATO deaths.

== Incidents ==
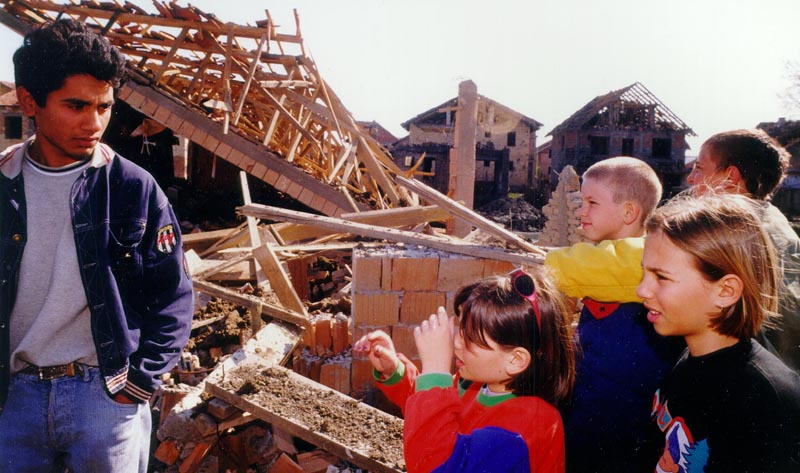
Damage in Novi Sad

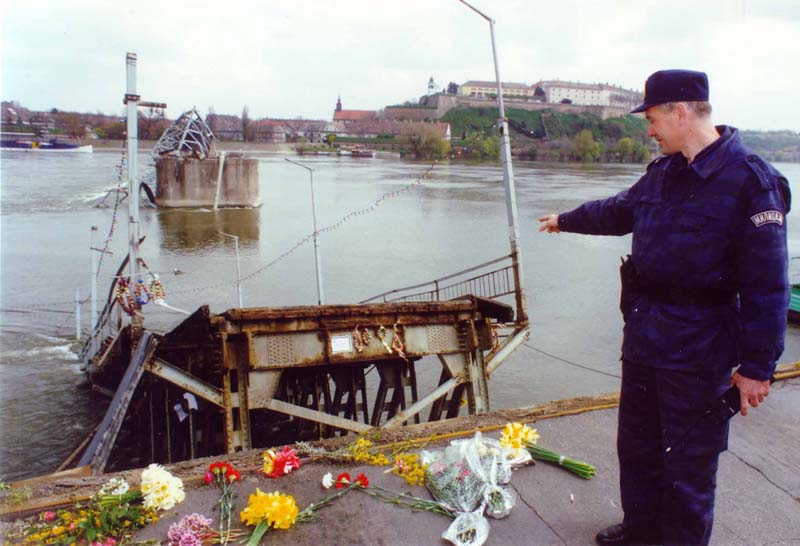
Destroyed Varadin Bridge

=== March 30, 1999: Bombing of Čačak ===
On March 30, 1999, during a two-day air raid on the Sloboda munitions plant in Čačak, Mileva Kuveljić was killed in her home outside of the factory from airstrikes. According to a local historian, Goran Davidović, another person injured by that day's airstrikes died a month later.

=== April 1–2, 1999: Novi Sad and Orahovac ===
On April 1, 1999 at 5:05 am local time, the Varadin Bridge in Novi Sad was destroyed by NATO projectiles, killing a 29-year old NIS refinery worker Oleg Nasov. The following day, 11 civilians were killed after the village of Nogovac in Orahovac was struck by three missiles.

=== April 4–6, 1999: Belgrade, Pančevo, Aleksinac, and Vranje ===
On April 4, 1999, three workers were killed when the oil refinery in Pančevo was hit by NATO airstrikes. Subsequently, 80,000 tons of oil ignited into flames, and the concentration of carcinogens over Pančevo rose 10,500 times higher than local laws allowed at the time. On the same day, one civilian was killed after airstrikes struck electric heating plants in Belgrade.

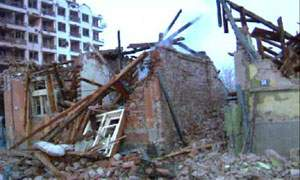
Damage in Aleksinac

On April 5, 1999, a neighborhood in Vranje was bombed, killing two civilians and injuring 15. On the night of April 5–6, 1999, 12 civilians were killed in the southern mining town of Aleksinac after it was struck by NATO forces. A total of 35 homes and 125 apartment units were destroyed, with no obvious military target in the vicinity according to the Serbian newspaper Politika.

=== April 12, 1999: Merdare and the Grdelica train bombing ===
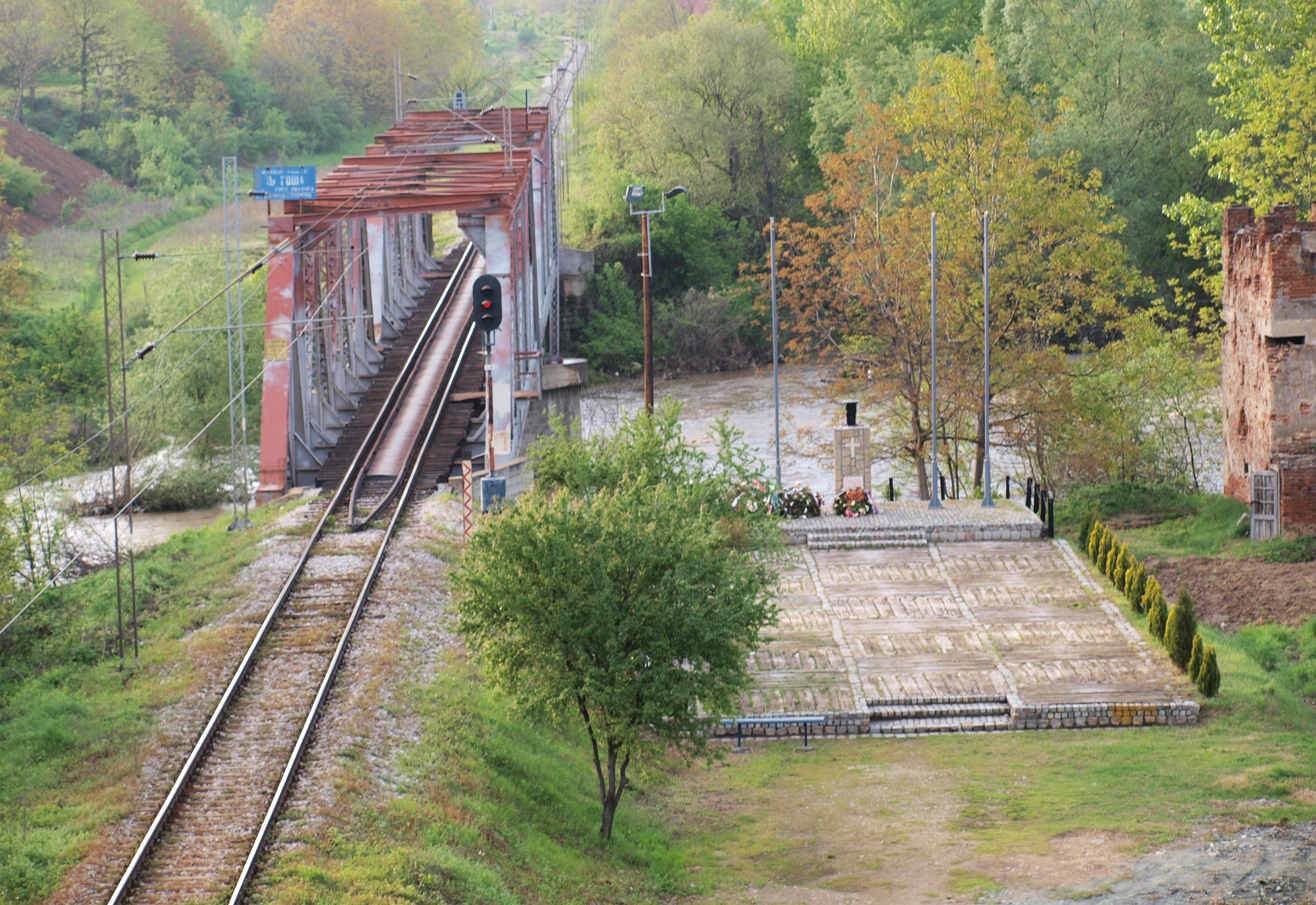
Railway bridge and monument to victims of the Grdelica train bombing

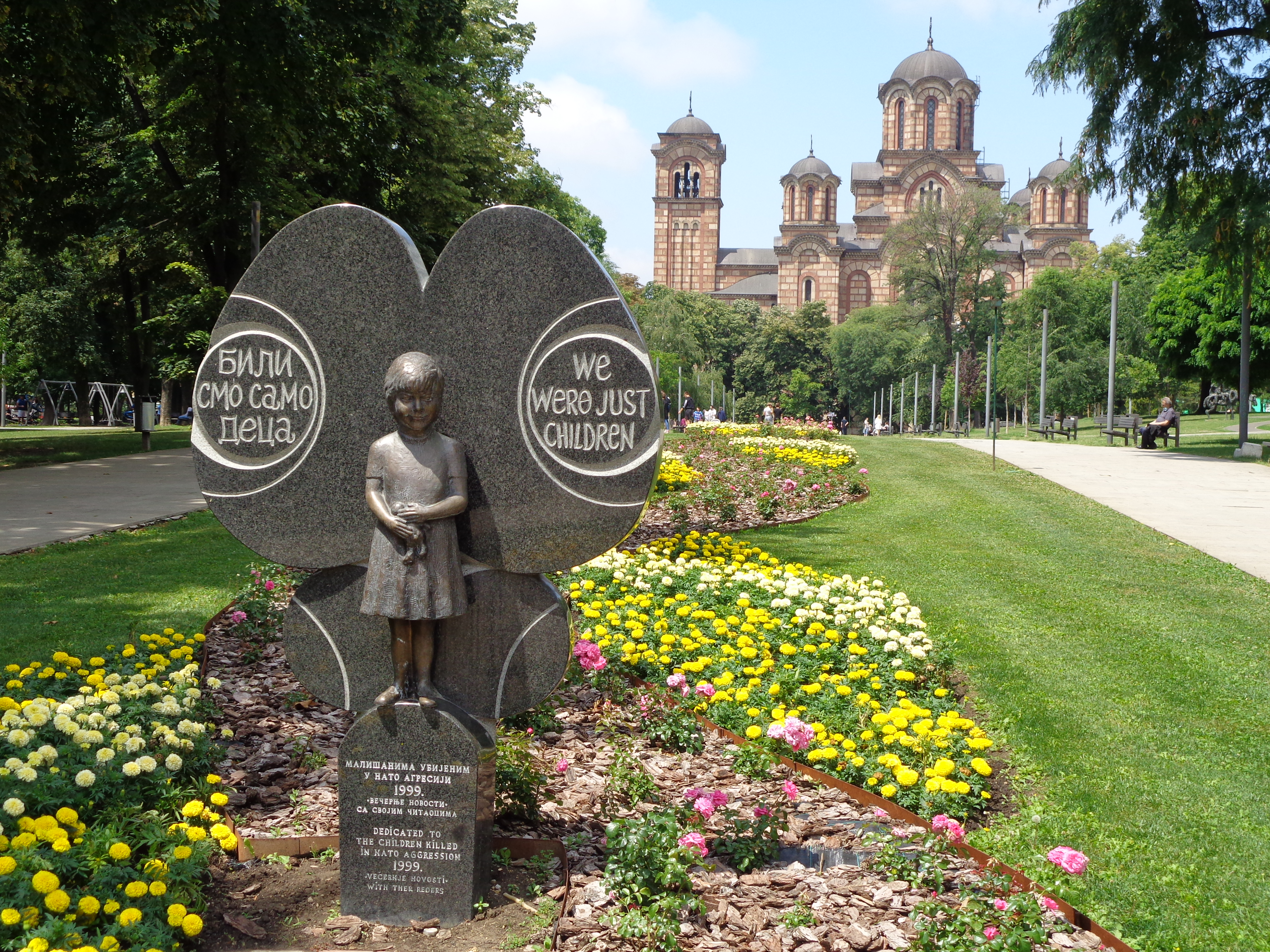
A monument to the children killed in the NATO bombing located in Tašmajdan Park, Belgrade, featuring a bronze sculpture of Milica Rakić

On April 12, 1999, NATO airstrikes struck a railway bridge in Grdelica, hitting a passenger train on the Niš - Preševo line. According to Večernje Novosti, 15 of the killed civilians were identified, a large number of passengers were classified as "missing". The Leskovac city board forbade medical workers and doctors to give information to journalists on collected remains of killed civilians, preventing a more complete record of civilian casualties from taking place. Human Rights Watch listed the names of 12 passengers killed in Grdelica, although reported that 20 civilians were killed in total. Yugoslavia's Tanjug reported about 50 passengers killed, whereas the Belgrade government recorded 55. In a commemorative gathering held on April 12, 2017, Miodrag Poledica, Serbia's Minister of Construction, Transport, and Infrastructure, asserted that "the exact number of those killed was never determined, but it's assumed that there were more than fifty."

In a separate bombing on the same day, six civilians were killed in Merdare from NATO airstrikes on the border of Kuršumlija and Podujevo.

=== April 14, 1999: First bombing of a refugee column ===
On April 14, during daylight hours, NATO aircraft repeatedly bombed Albanian refugee movements over a twelve-mile (19 km) stretch of road between Gjakova and Dečani in western Kosovo, killing 73 civilians and injuring 36 others. The attack began at 13:29 and persisted for about two hours, causing civilian deaths in numerous locations on the convoy route near the villages of Bistrazin, Gradis, Madanaj, and Meja.

=== April 21, 1999: Second bombing of refugee camp ===
On April 21, 1999, a Serbian refugee camp in Majino Naselje of Gjakova was struck by heavy airstrikes. The Los Angeles Times reported that four civilians were killed, however a Belgrade-based bulletin listed the names of five individuals who were killed in the attack. NATO spokesman Mike Phillips denied that NATO was responsible for the bombing of Majino Naselje.

=== April 23, 1999: Radio Television Serbia (RTS) headquarters bombing ===
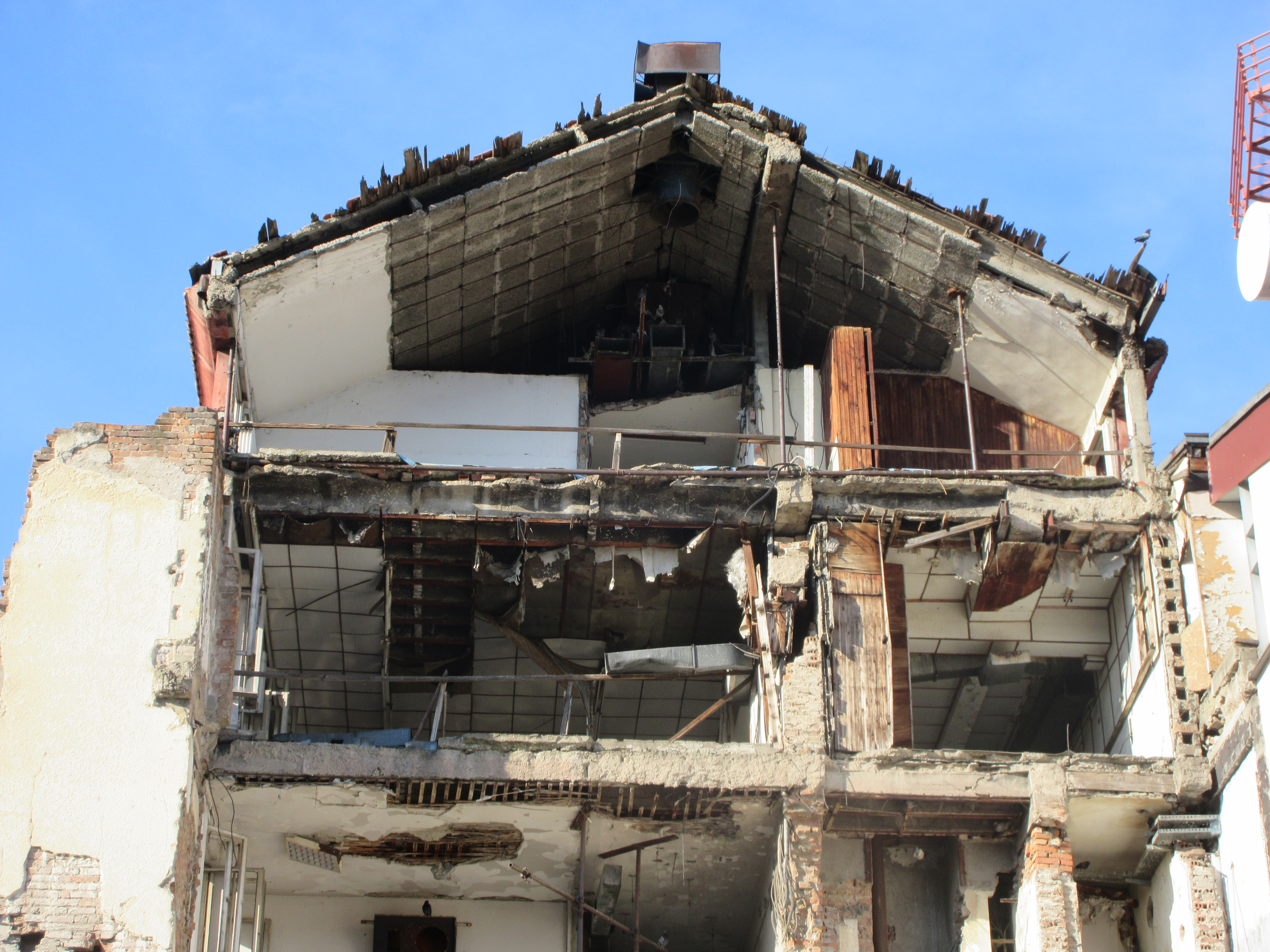
The damaged headquarters of the Radio Television of Serbia

On April 23, 1999, Radio Television of Serbia (RTS)'s headquarters were struck by NATO. As a consequence, 16 RTS civilian technicians and workers were killed and sixteen were wounded.

=== April 27, 1999: First bombing of Surdulica ===
On April 27, 1999, NATO missiles struck several houses in the southern town of Surdulica. A CNN journalist named Alessio Vinci subsequently visited the local morgue, where he reported 16 civilians killed as a result of the attack. One of Serbia's public broadcasters, RTS, reported that 20 civilians were killed in Surdulica on April 27, 1999. Many of the victims had been killed in a single house on Zmaj Jova street,^{1} owned by Vojislav Milić. Milić's family and several neighbors took refuge in Milić's basement when his house was struck by two bombs, after which nine people were killed in his house alone.

=== April 29–May 1, 1999: Montenegro and Kosovo ===
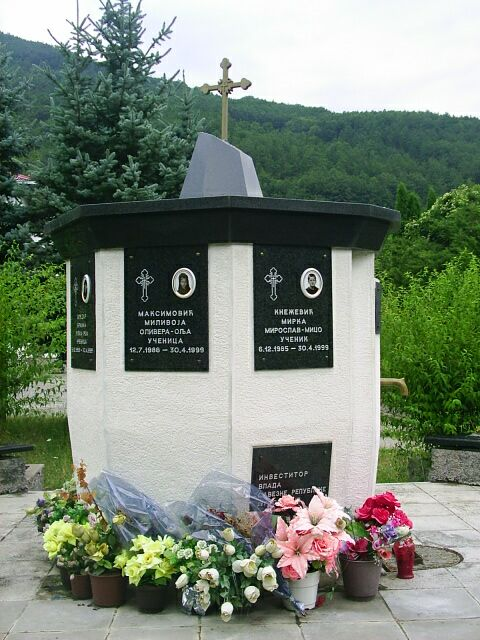
Monument to the victims in Murino, near Plav

On April 29, 1999, one woman was killed and three more people were injured from shrapnel during the bombing of Tuzi. On April 30, 1999, NATO bombs struck Murino, a village located near Plav, killing six civilians of whom three were children under the age of 16.

On May 1, 1999, a Niš-Ekspres bus taking passengers to Kosovo was hit by NATO missiles when it crossed a bridge in the village of Lužane near Podujevo.^{2} The number of casualties reported from the Niš-Ekspres bombing vary, with Human Rights Watch recording 39 civilians killed whereas the Minister of Health Leposava Milićević reported that 47 civilians killed in the bus bombing had been identified.

In a separate attack, also on May 1, 1999, at least 12 civilians were killed when a Romani neighborhood in Prizren was struck by NATO bombs.

=== May 6, 1999: Novi Sad School Bombing ===
On May 6, 1999, on the Serbian holiday of George's Day in Spring. A NATO aircraft tried to bomb the Majevica Military base in Novi Sad, A School which was a few blocks away. The NATO aircraft missed 4 fired projectiles and hit a Primary School OŠ Svetozar Marković Toza, to which there were 44 Injured Victims, Nobody was killed.

=== May 4, 1999: Bus bombing in Savine Vode ===
On May 4, 1999, a bus was destroyed in the village of Savine Vode near Peć, with 17 civilian deaths. NATO denied responsibility, however a remnant of a bomb found in Savine Vode after the attack had the markings of Magnavox, an American electronics manufacturer. The Yugoslav government submitted further evidence to Human Rights Watch, after which Human Rights Watch counted the casualties as those inflicted by NATO.

=== May 7, 1999 ===
==== Cluster bombing of Niš ====
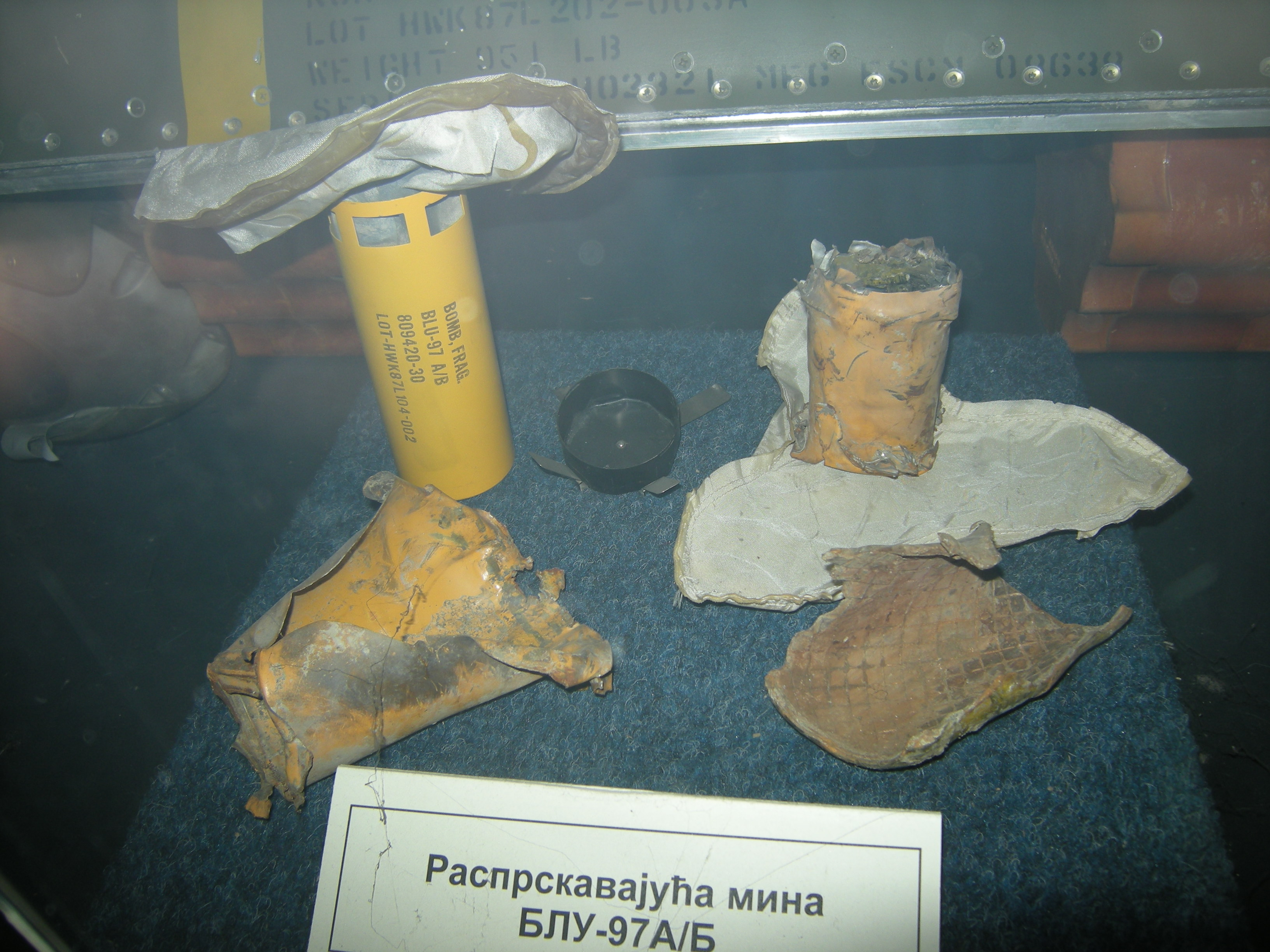
The NATO cluster munition in the Aeronautical Museum Belgrade

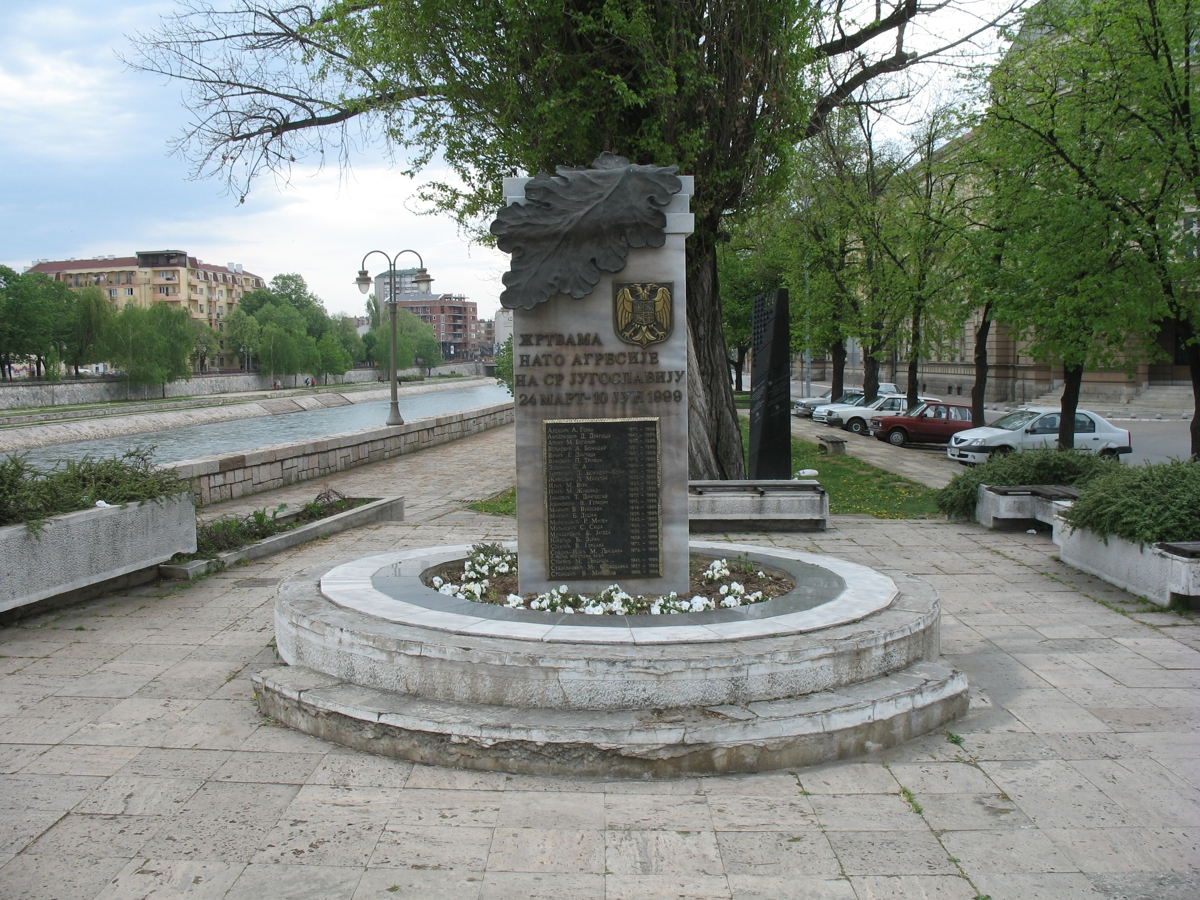
Monument to victims of the bombing Niš

On May 7, 1999, cluster munitions were dropped on Niš. Human Rights Watch recorded 14 civilians killed whereas Serbian sources reported 16 civilians killed.

==== Chinese embassy bombing ====
A salvo of US JDAM GPS-guided bombs struck the embassy of the People's Republic of China in Belgrade, killing three Chinese diplomats and injuring 20 others. The American government said the bombing was accidental while the Chinese government said it was deliberate. In August, the U.S. paid the $4.5 million to the families of the three diplomats.

=== May 14, 1999: Bombing of Koriša ===
Starting before midnight and lasting into the morning hours of May 14, 1999, NATO planes bombed the village of Koriša in Kosovo, where Albanian peasants were seeking refuge in a convoy. Sources vary between 77 and 87 killed. Survivors of the attack claimed that they had been set up by the Yugoslav police, who led them to the supply depot which was bombed that night. The Yugoslav police had led the refugees to the depot promising them refuge and passage to Albania, although the survivors claimed that the police asked for money and made threats before escorting them. After the bombing of Koriša, Yugoslav troops took TV crews to the scene shortly after the bombing. The Yugoslav government insisted that NATO had targeted civilians.

=== May 19–21, 1999: Dedinje, Gnjilane, and the Dubrava prison massacre ===
==== Gnjilane ====
At approximately 10:20 am local time on May 19, 1999, a small industrial area in Gnjilane was struck by NATO airstrikes, immediately killing three women who were working at the agricultural firm "Mladost". A man working for "Binačka Morava" initially survived the airstrikes, but died of his injuries the same day. Glas javnosti published the names of all four workers killed in Gnjilane that day.

==== Dragiša Mišović hospital bombing ====
At approximately 12:50 am local time on May 19, 1999, the University Hospital Center Dr Dragiša Mišović in Belgrade was destroyed by NATO laser-guided bombs. RTS listed the names of three patients killed. Seven soldiers of the Yugoslav Army were also killed in the hospital, although their names were listed separately from those of the three patients. NATO admitted that a missile was aimed at barracks in the Dedinje district, which is close to the hospital, went astray.

==== Dubrava prison massacre ====
Starting on May 19, 1999, NATO forces bombed the town of Istok, killing three prisoners and a prison guard that day. Two days later, NATO forces struck the prison complex again, with at least 19 prisoners being killed from the airstrikes, according to Human Rights Watch. Subsequent to the lethal airstrikes, special units from the Yugoslavia's Ministry of Internal Affairs along with various criminals selected by the special forces carried out a false flag operation, during which the prisoners were massacred by firearms, after which state agency Tanjug claimed that all of the prison victims were killed by the airstrikes.

=== May 26–31, 1999: Belgrade and southern Serbia ===
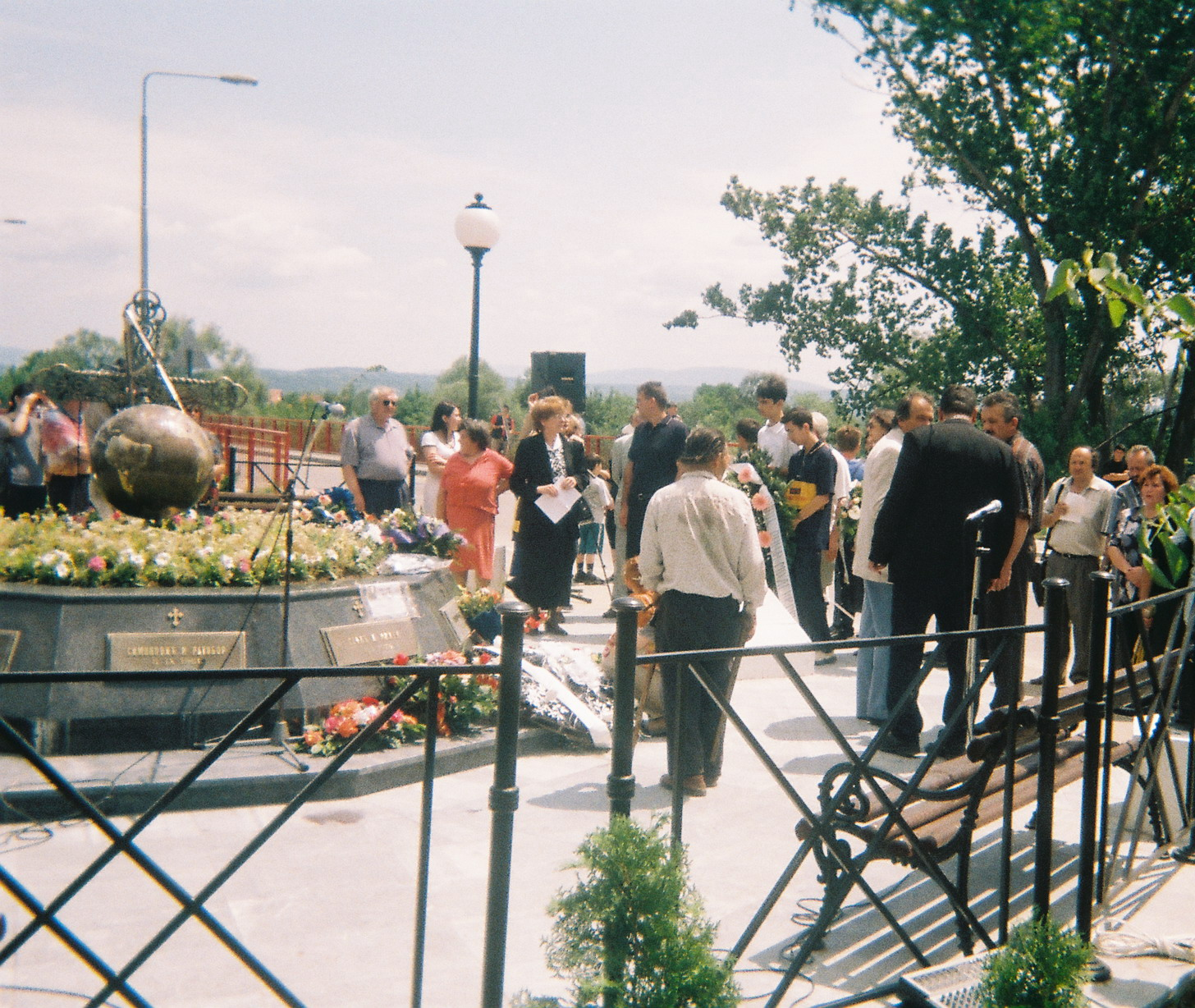
Commemoration of the victims of the Varvarin Massacre on May 30, 2001.

On May 26, three civilians were killed from an airstrike on Ralja, Serbia.

Two civilians were killed on May 27, 1999, when a bridge over the Jablanica river in Lebane was struck. Reporting on this incident was initially uncertain about which exact bridge was struck.

On May 29, 1999, the Prizren-Brezovica road was subject to NATO airstrikes. A chauffeur was killed driving in a convoy of journalists, and three more were injured. At 1:05 pm local time on the following day, 1999, 10 civilians were killed when NATO bombers mounted a daylight raid on a bridge over the Great Morava river in Varvarin. The streets and bridge had more people than usual as Trinity Sunday was observed that day. NATO spokesman Jamie Shea said the alliance had bombed a "legitimate designated military target".

Surdulica was bombed for the second time on the night of May 30–31, 1999, when NATO airstrikes destroyed a sanatorium and a retirement home. Human Rights Watch published the names of the 23 civilians killed in the sanatorium.

On May 31, 1999, a residential building was struck by a NATO bomb in Novi Pazar, killing 11 civilians. On the same day, Human Rights Watch recorded that airstrikes killed three civilians in three separated incidents throughout central and southern Serbia; in Vranje, on the "Raška bridge", and in Draževac.

=== June 7-8, 1999: Podgorac and Novi Sad ===
Three civilians were killed at the Ekohrana farm in Podgorac on June 7, 1999.

Over the night of June 7-8, 1999, one civilian was killed in Novi Sad's Šangaj neighborhood when a petroleum processing plant was struck. A second victim who was initially injured subsequently died from injuries.

== Human Rights Watch analysis ==
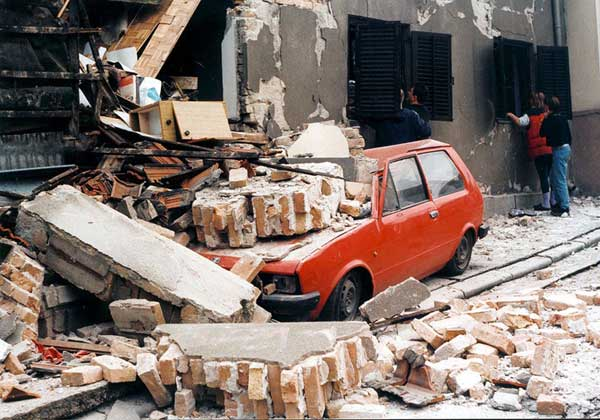
A street in Belgrade destroyed by NATO bombs

Human Rights Watch documented and evaluated the impact and effects of the NATO military operation, and confirmed 90 incidents in which civilians died as a result of NATO bombing. These included attacks where cluster bombs were dropped. In 1999, it was estimated that 488–527 Yugoslav civilians died as a result of NATO bombing. The report also criticized Pentagon and NATO officials for a lack of attention to the issue of civilian deaths, suggesting "a resistance to acknowledging the actual civilian effects and an indifference to evaluating their causes."

== NATO strategy and claims ==
From the very beginning of Operation Allied Force, minimizing civilian casualties was a major declared NATO concern. According to NATO, consideration of civilian casualties was fully incorporated into the planning and targeting process. All targets were "looked at in terms of their military significance in relation to the collateral damage or the unintended consequence that might be there," General Shelton said on April 14: "Then every precaution is made...so that collateral damage is avoided." According to Lt. Gen. Michael Short, "collateral damage drove us to an extraordinary degree...[and] committed hours of [my] day dealing with the allies on issues of collateral damage." "There is always a cost to defeat an evil," said NATO spokesman Jamie Shea, "It never comes free, unfortunately. But the cost of failure to defeat a great evil is far higher." He insisted NATO planes had bombed only "legitimate designated military targets," and if more civilians had died it was because NATO had been forced into military action. He then defended this notion by stating, "NATO does not attack civilian targets, we attack exclusively military targets and take every precaution to avoid inflicting harm on civilians."

== See also ==
- Casualty recording
- Humanitarian Law Centre
- Civilian casualties during the NATO intervention in Libya

== Notes ==
- ^1 Zmaj Jova street is named after Jovan Jovanović Zmaj. Serbian variations of nouns are such that the street is spelled as "Zmaj Jove" (as opposed to having an "a" letter at the end) in the context of the sentence in the OK Radio article on the Milić family from Surdulica.
- ^2 There are multiple villages in the former Yugoslavia named Lužane. The Lužane bus bombing took place in a village called Lužane by Podujevo in Kosovo. However, there is another village also called Lužane located near Aleksinac, although that is not where the Niš-Ekspres bus was bombed.

== Sources ==
- Trbovich, Ana S. (2008). A Legal Geography of Yugoslavia's Disintegration. Oxford University Press. ISBN 978-0-19-533343-5.
