= Varvarin bridge bombing =

1999 airstrike

- Part of NATO bombing of Yugoslavia
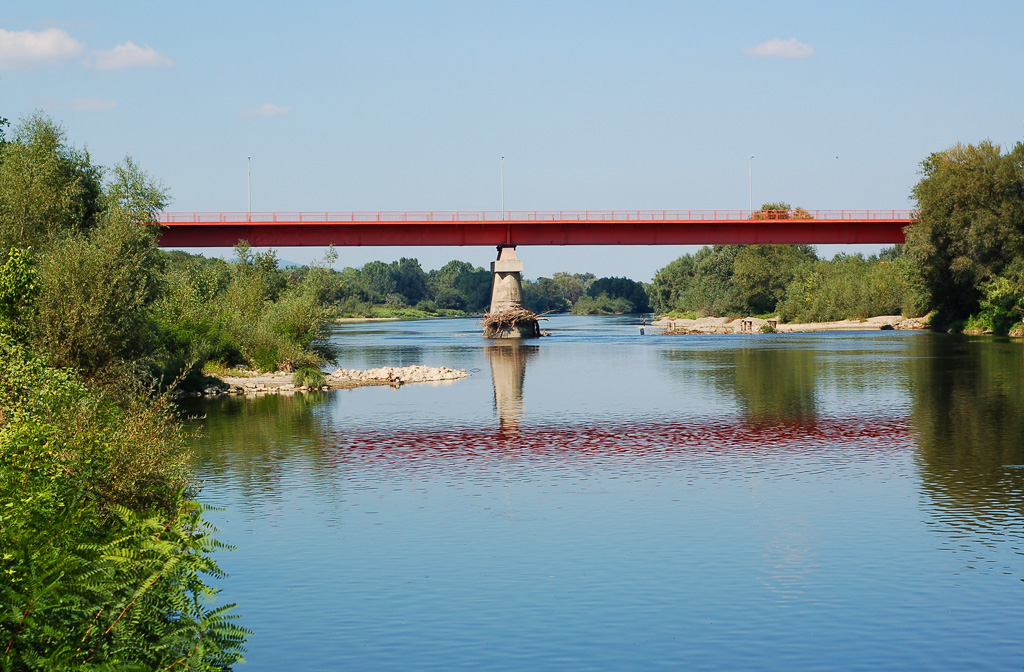
- Bridge after reconstruction
- Location: Varvarin; 43.7247°N 21.37402°E
- Target: Varvarin bridge
- Date: 30 May 1999; Shortly after noon
- Executed by: NATO
- Casualties: 10 killed; 17 severely injured
- Location within Serbia

The Varvarin bridge bombing on 30 May 1999 was an aerial bombing executed by NATO as part of the Operation Allied Force. Ten people were killed and 17 were severely injured, all of them civilians.

== Events ==
On 30 May 1999, as part of the NATO bombing of Yugoslavia, the NATO bombed a bridge crossing the Velika Morava river in Varvarin. It was Sunday and the streets were full of people going to the market or coming back from the Orthodox church service for the Holy Trinity that had just finished. Soon after noon, two low-flying NATO F-16 warplanes fired the first laser-guided bomb strike against the bridge, killing three people and severely injuring five more. A few minutes after the first strike, as people rushed to the bridge to help the injured, two more bombs were fired. In total, 10 civilians were killed and 17 were severely injured.

The 10 fatal victims were Sanja Milenković (15), Milan Savić (28), Vojkan Stanković (30), Zoran Marinković (33), Stojan Ristić (52), Ratibor Simonović (24), Ružica Simonović (55), Milivoje Ćirić (66), Dragoslav Terzić (67) and Tola Apostolović (74).

The pilots were American and the military purpose of the operation remains unclear.

== Reactions ==
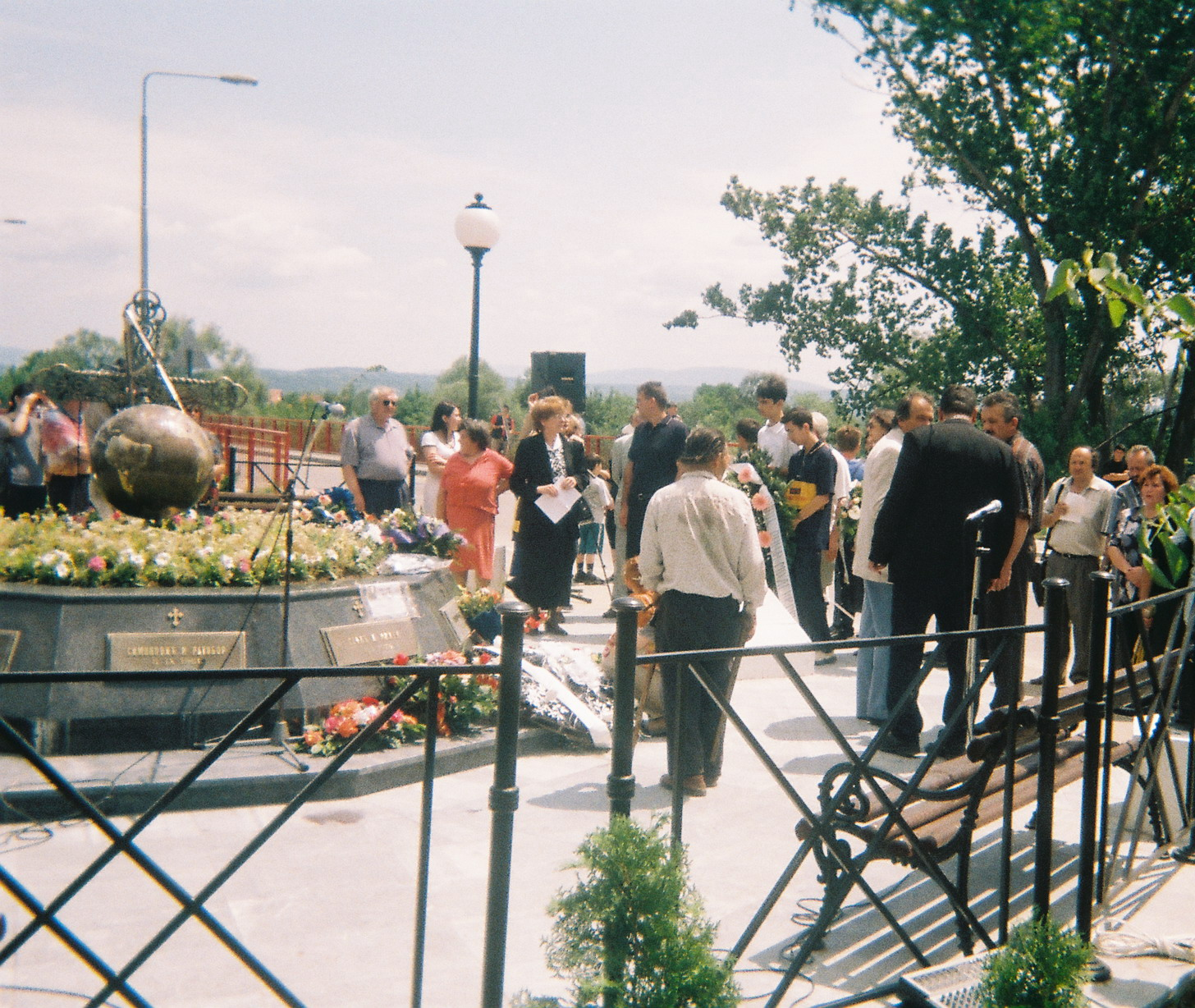
Commemoration of the victims of the bombing

NATO spokesperson Jamie Shea declared that the bridge was a military target. Locals said that the bridge was too narrow for tanks and it was attacked on a clear day instead of during the night, accusing NATO of deliberately killing civilians. After this incident, NATO changed its rules of engagement.

== Legal actions ==
In 2003, families of the victims sued the German government in Germany. The claimants argued that Germany gave assistance to NATO air operations and claimed compensations. German courts dismissed the right of the families to seek compensations in Germany. First in the regional court of Bonn in 2003, then in the higher regional court of Cologne in 2005 and the Federal Court of Justice in 2006. The families filed a complaint to the Federal Constitutional Court in 2007 seeking to reverse previous court decisions. On 13 August 2013, Federal Constitutional Court dismissed the claims again, arguing that victims of military operations abroad did not have the right for individual compensations.

== Remembrance ==
Every year on May 30, an official remembrance ceremony is held in Serbia.

The "Sanja Milenković" Fund, established in memory of the youngest victim of the bombing, aimed to provide scholarships for talented students. The fund raised over 200,000 euros and awarded 44 scholarships, but it became inactive due to financial issues, including the bankruptcy of Beogradska Banka.

== See also ==
- Civilian casualties during Operation Allied Force
- Grdelica train bombing
- Lužane bus bombing
- Koriša bombing
- NATO bombing of Albanian refugees near Gjakova

== Bibliography ==
- Human Rights Watch (2000). Civilian Deaths in the NATO Air Campaign (PDF) (Report). Archived (PDF) from the original on 10 December 2021.
- Amnesty International (2000). Federal Republic of Yugoslavia (FRY) /NATO: "Collateral damage" or unlawful killings? Violations of the Laws of War by NATO during Operation Allied Force (Report).
- Fenrick, William J. (2001). "Targeting and Proportionality during the NATO Bombing Campaign against Yugoslavia". European Journal of International Law. 12 (3). Oxford University Press: 489–502. doi:10.1093/ejil/12.3.489.
- Sayapin, Sergey (2004). "The varvarin case: Compensation impossible?". Journal of Military Ethics. 3 (2): 188–193. doi:10.1080/15027570410006147.
- Gärditz, Klaus Ferdinand (2014). "Bridge of Varvarin". The American Journal of International Law. 108 (1): 86–93. doi:10.5305/amerjintelaw.108.1.0086. S2CID 146947308.
- Mehring, Sigrid (2015). "The Judgment of the German Bundesverfassungsgericht concerning Reparations for the Victims of the Varvarin Bombing". International Criminal Law Review. 15 (1): 191–201. doi:10.1163/15718123-01501005.
