= Niš Bus Station =

Bus station in Niš, Serbia

Autobuska stanica Niš
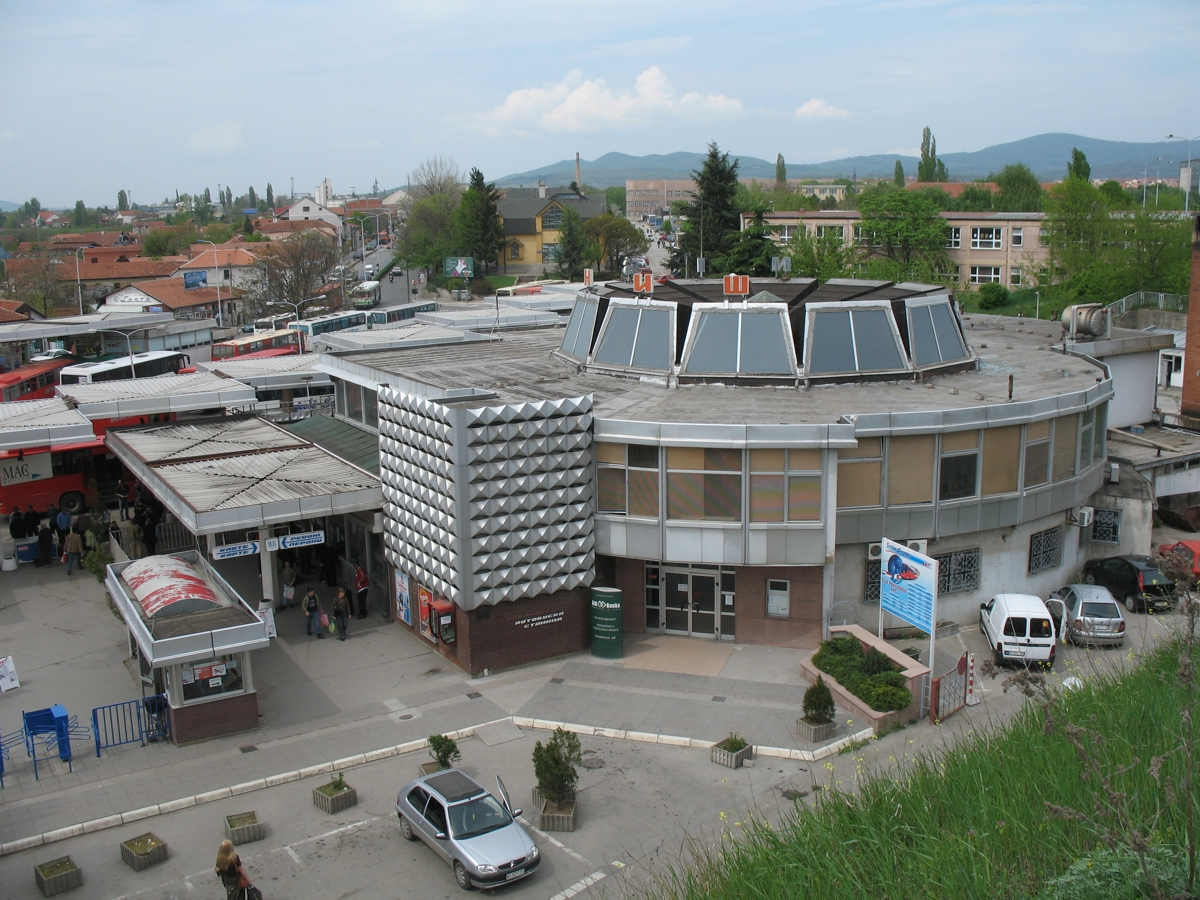
- The main terminal

General information
- Lines: Niš-Ekspres; Others
Location

Niš Bus Station is the main bus station in Niš, Serbia. The station is a hub for urban transit and intercity carrier Niš-Ekspres.

Buses from Niš to Belgrade, the capital of Serbia, run every 30 minutes. Direct bus lines are available, as well as buses that stop in multiple cities on the way.

== Bibliography ==
- https://getbybus.com/en/blog/buses-nis/
