= NATO bombing of Albanian refugees near Gjakova =

Incident in the Kosovo War

- Part of the NATO bombing of Yugoslavia and the Kosovo War
- Location: Gjakova, Serbia, Federal Republic of Yugoslavia
- Date: April 14, 1999; 13:30 (UTC+1:00)
- Target: Disputed
- Attack type: Aerial bombing
- Deaths: 73
- Injuries: 36
- Perpetrator: NATO

The NATO bombing of Albanian refugees near Gjakova occurred on 14 April 1999 during the NATO bombing of Yugoslavia, when NATO planes bombed refugees on a twelve-mile stretch of road between the towns of Gjakova and Deçan in western Kosovo. 73 Kosovo Albanian civilians were killed. Among the victims were 16 children.

== NATO response ==
NATO and the United States initially claimed that the target was exclusively a military convoy and that Yugoslav forces may have been responsible for any attacks on civilians, stating "after the convoy was hit, military people got out and attacked civilians." However, two days later, NATO acknowledged that its aircraft had bombed civilian vehicles, claiming this to be by mistake. Reporters from the American media went to the scene that same day and interviewed survivors and saw damaged farm tractors, burned bodies identified as refugees, bomb craters and shrapnel. Initially, NATO said its aircraft had targeted military vehicles, then reported that an American F-16 pilot had fired on what he thought to be military trucks. NATO expressed "deep regret." Tanjug reported that three Serbian policemen were also killed in the attack.

== See also ==
- Koriša bombing
- Varvarin bridge bombing
- Lužane bus bombing
- Grdelica train bombing
