= Milica Rakić =

Civilian casualty of NATO bombing and Orthodox folk saint (1996–1999)

- Милица Ракић
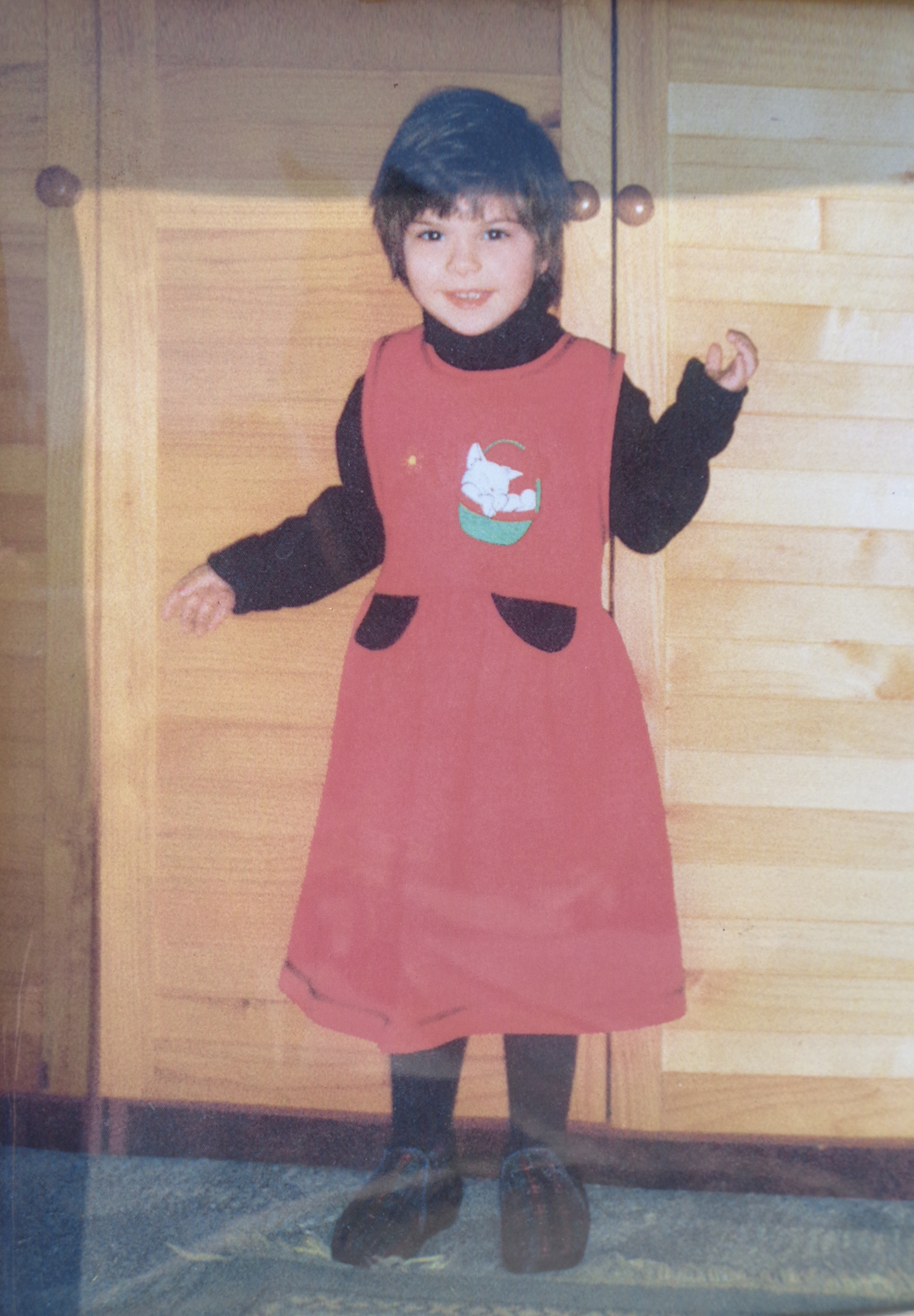
- Photo of Milica Rakić
- Born: 9 January 1996; Belgrade, Serbia, FR Yugoslavia
- Died: 17 April 1999 (aged 3); Belgrade, Serbia, FR Yugoslavia
- Citizenship: Yugoslav
- Known for: being a child killed during the NATO bombing of Yugoslavia

Saint Milica of Belgrade
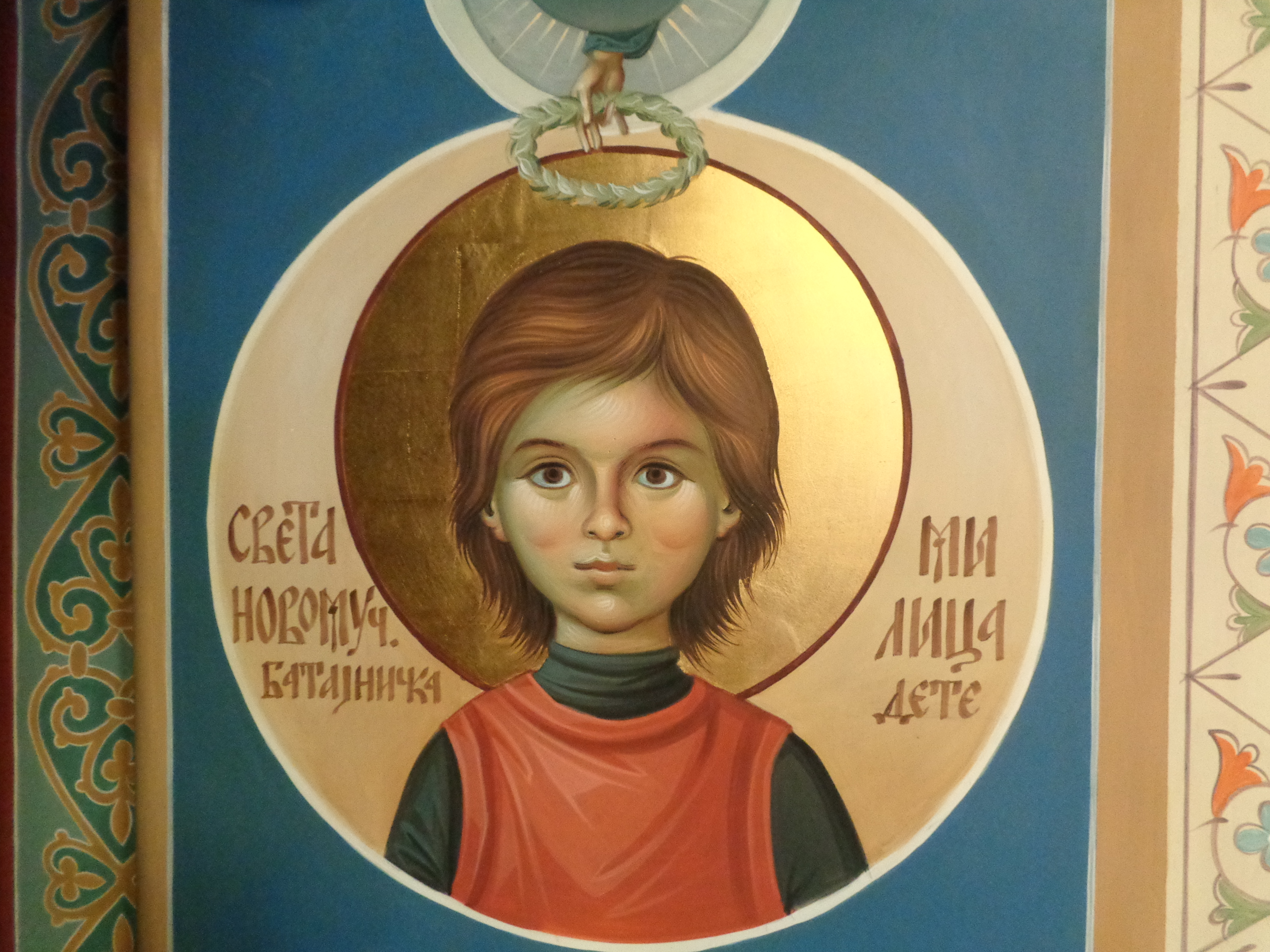
- Fresco in Vavedenje Monastery, Senjak, Belgrade

New Child Martyr
- Born: 9 January 1996; Belgrade, Federal Republic of Yugoslavia (now modern-day Serbia)
- Residence: 8 Dimitrije Lazarov Raša Street, Batajnica, Belgrade
- Died: 17 April 1999; 8 Dimitrije Lazarov Raša Street, Batajnica, Belgrade, Federal Republic of Yugoslavia
- Cause of death: Shrapnel intake from a cluster munition
- Honored in: Folk Orthodoxy
- Major shrine: Batajnica cemetery, Belgrade, Serbia
- Feast: 17 April [O.S. 4 April]
- Attributes: Martyr's cross, wreath, red dress

Milica Rakić (Serbian Cyrillic: Милица Ракић; 9 January 1996 – 17 April 1999) was a three-year-old Serbian girl who was killed by a cluster munition during the NATO bombing of Yugoslavia.

== Biography ==
Milica Rakić was born in Belgrade on 9 January 1996. Her parents were Žarko and Dušica Rakić. She had an older brother named Aleksa.

Between 9:30 p.m. and 10:00 p.m. on 17 April 1999, three-year-old Rakić was struck by shrapnel while in the bathroom of her second-floor apartment at 8 Dimitrije Lazarov Raša Street, in the Belgrade suburb of Batajnica. Her home was located 1 kilometre (0.62 mi) from the Batajnica Air Base. Batajnica was repeatedly targeted by NATO during its air campaign against Yugoslavia, which lasted between March and June 1999. Rakić was killed instantly. At the time of her death, she was sitting on a potty chair. Five other civilians were wounded in the attack.

Rakić's funeral took place on 19 April. The same day, Yugoslavia's Minister of Information Milan Komnenić released a statement attributing her death to "NATO cowards".

== Legacy ==
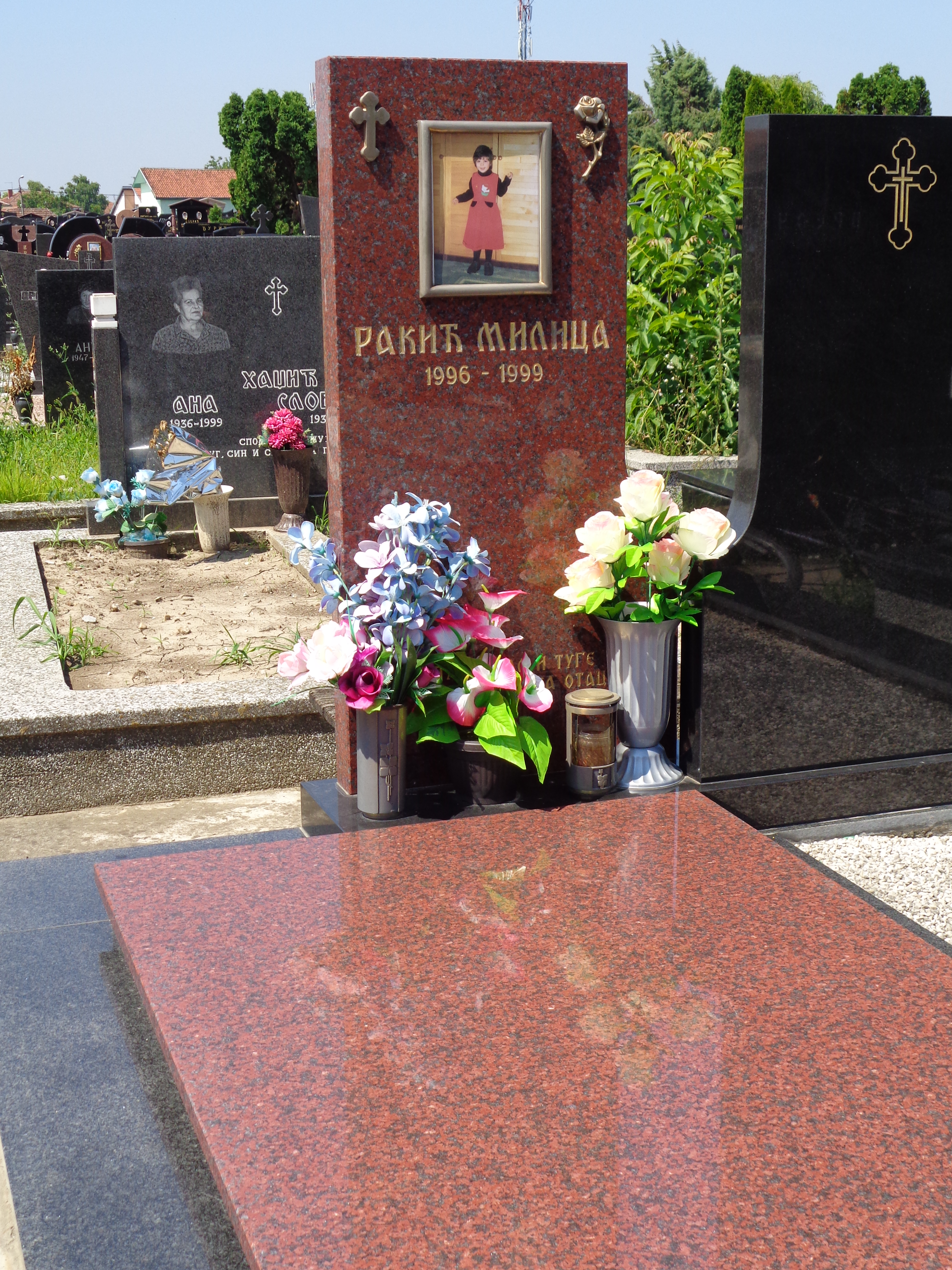
Rakić's grave in Batajnica cemetery

Rakić was one of 89 children killed during the NATO air campaign, according to Serbian Prime Minister Mirko Cvetković. Rakić's death was widely covered in the Serbian media. Her death was not reported by most major Western news outlets. The final NATO report on the bombing of Yugoslavia made no mention of Rakić's death, even under the category of "special incidents". Human Rights Watch (HRW) investigators visited the site of her death on 7 August 1999, inspected the damage and interviewed eyewitnesses. According to HRW, a cluster munition exploded next to the apartment in which Rakić was living. The incident marked the first NATO use of cluster munitions in Serbia-proper; all prior instances of their use by NATO had been recorded in Kosovo. The Yugoslav Ministry of Health provided HRW with photographic documentation of the incident, which was also included in the book White Book of NATO Crimes in Yugoslavia, published by the Government of Yugoslavia.

In 2000, a monument dedicated to the children killed in the NATO bombing of Yugoslavia was unveiled in Belgrade's Tašmajdan Park. It featured a bronze sculpture of Rakić in front of a marble block inscribed with the words "we were just children" written in Serbian and English. The monument was commissioned by the newspaper Večernje novosti and financed by donations that it had received from its readers. The sculpture was stolen twice, once in 2000 and again in 2001, after which it was never recovered. In 2014, a commemorative fountain was dedicated in Rakić's memory in Batajnica. The following year, a new sculpture of Rakić was unveiled in Tašmajdan Park to replace the one that had previously been stolen. The Little Milica Rakić Park in Batajnica was also established in her memory. The park was subjected to extensive renovations in 2017, financed by Serbia's Ministry of Defence.

Following her death, some sectors of the Serbian public called for Rakić to be canonized as a saint by the Serbian Orthodox Church. In 2004, the Tvrdoš Monastery near the town of Trebinje, in Bosnia and Herzegovina, unveiled a fresco of Rakić which contained an inscription describing her as a neomartyr. At the time, the Serbian Orthodox Church announced that it would only consider canonizing Rakić if her cult gained a widespread following. On the frescoes, she is referred to as Saint Milica of Belgrade (Serbian: Света Милица Београдска, romanized: Sveta Milica Beogradska) or as Saint Milica of Batajnica (Serbian: Света Милица Батајничка, romanized: Sveta Milica Batajnička).

== Gallery ==
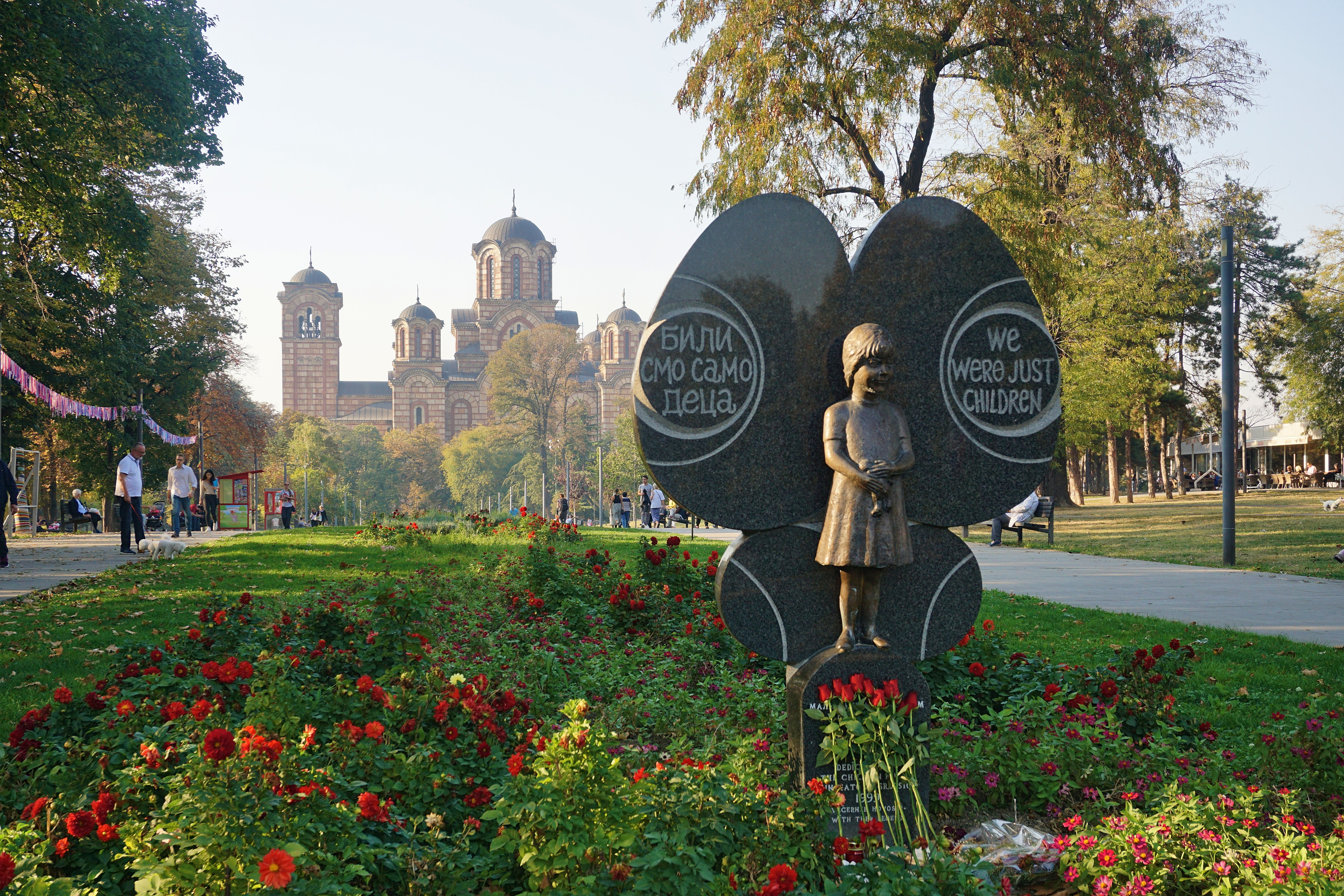
A monument to the children killed in the NATO bombing located in Tašmajdan Park, featuring a bronze sculpture of Rakić

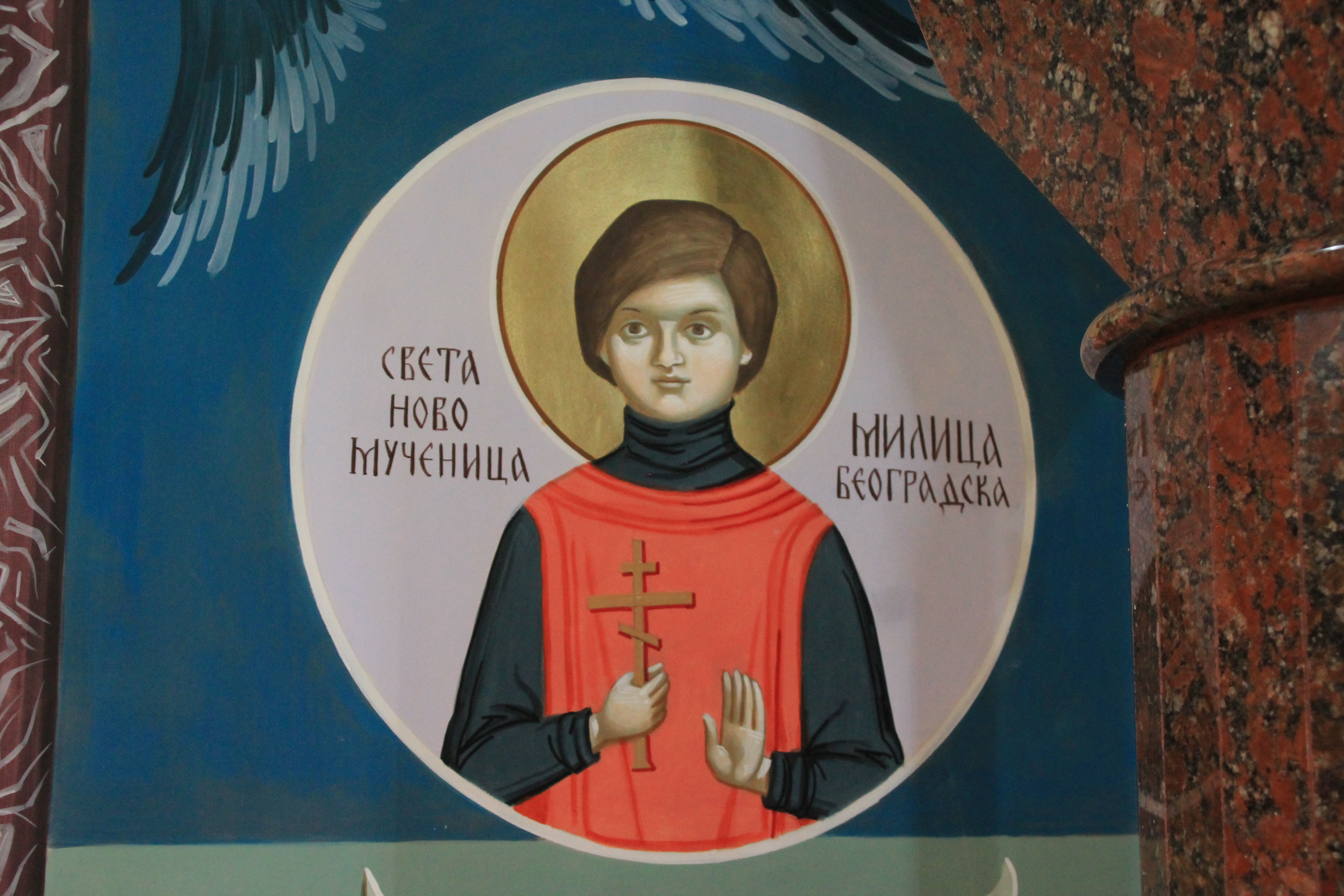
Fresco of New Martyr Milica Rakić in the medieval Tresije Monastery, Kosmaj

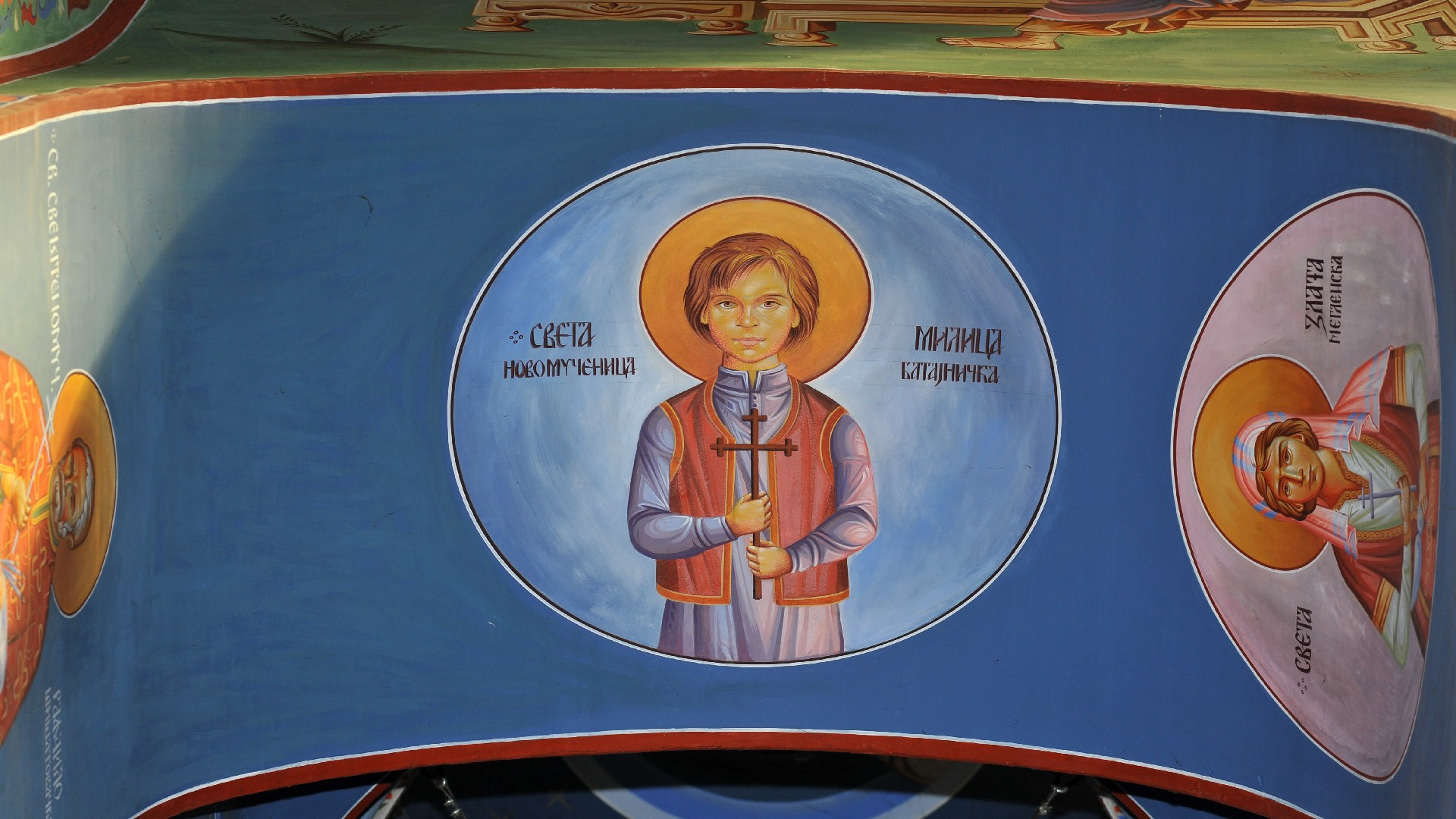
Fresco in Memorial Church, Lazarevac

== See also ==
- Civilian casualties during Operation Allied Force
