= Lužane bus bombing =

1999 bombing incident in Kosovo

NATO bombing of a bus near Lužane
- Location: Lužane near Podujevo
- Date: May 1, 1999
- Target: Bridge
- Attack type: Missile attack
- Deaths: 46
- Perpetrator: US Army

The Lužane bus bombing occurred on May 1, 1999, during the NATO bombing of Yugoslavia, when NATO AGM-114 Hellfire missiles fired from an AH-64 Apache targeted a bridge in Kosovo and hit a bus. The bus was hit on the bridge at Lužane (near Podujevo) north of Pristina. 46 civilians of Serb and Albanian ethnicity were killed. Among the victims were 14 children. The bus was cut in two, one section plunged off the bridge and the other remained burning on the bridge for over an hour. An ambulance attending the scene was hit in a second Nato strike. Amnesty International believes that NATO did not always meet its legal obligation in selecting targets to attack, one of which includes bombing of this bridge in Lužane, where NATO forces failed to suspend the attack after it was evident that they had struck the civilians. The bus (Niš-Ekspres) was on a regular express service, linking Pristina and Niš.

== See also ==
- Lužane
- Grdelica train bombing
- Varvarin bridge bombing
- Koriša bombing
- NATO bombing of Albanian refugees near Gjakova
