= Grdelica train bombing =

US attack in the Kosovo War

- Part of the Kosovo War
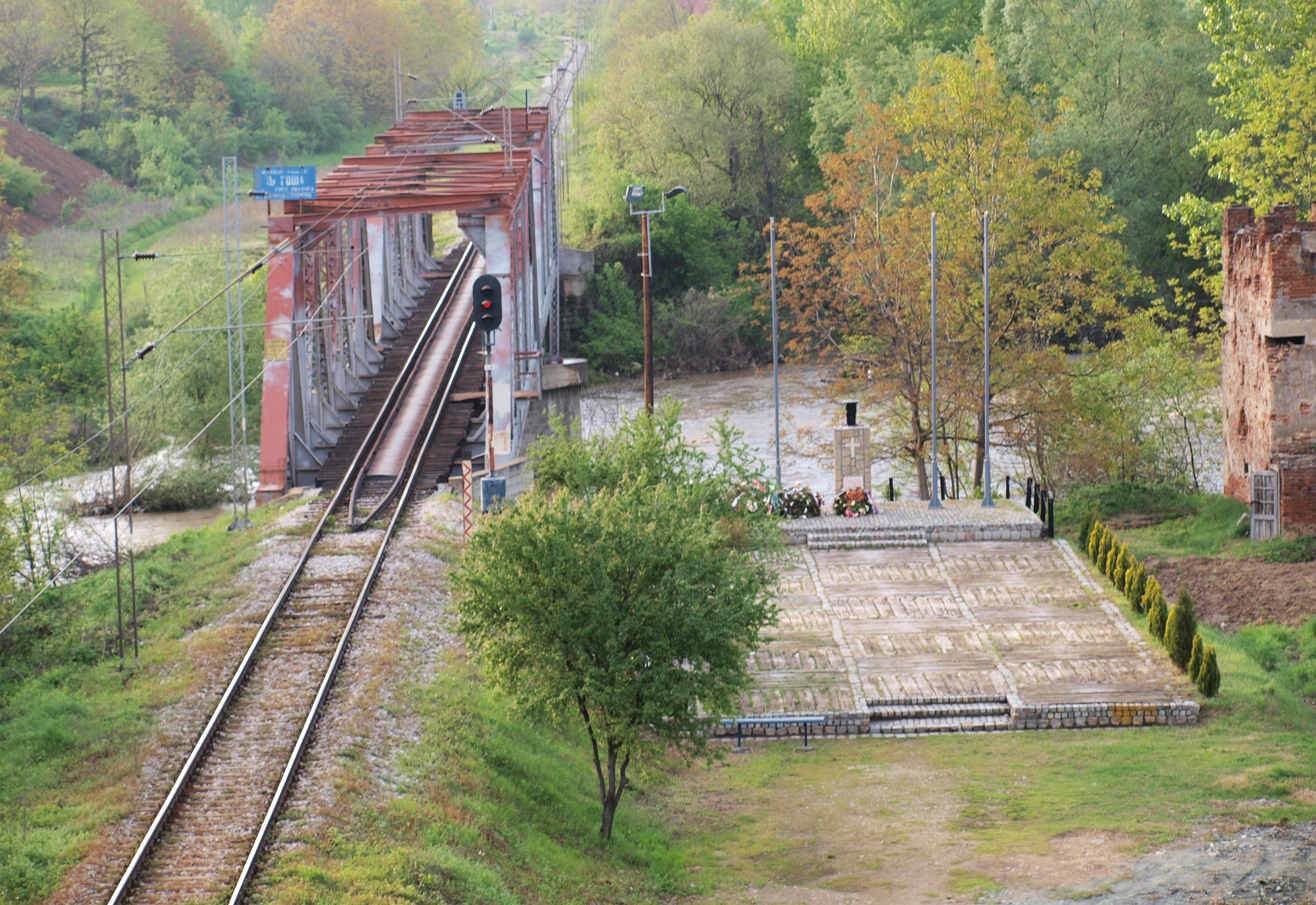
- Railway bridge and monument to victims
- Type: Missile attack
- Location: Near Grdelica, FR Yugoslavia; 42.87697°N 22.085953°E
- Target: Bridge
- Date: 12 April 1999
- Executed by: NATO
- Casualties: 20 killed or missing according to HRW; 50 killed according to Tanjug; 55 killed according to Serbian government

The Grdelica train bombing occurred on 12 April 1999, when two AGM-130 missiles fired by a USAF F-15E Strike Eagle fighter bomber hit a passenger train while it was passing across a railway bridge over the South Morava river in the Grdelica gorge, some 300 kilometres (190 mi) south of Belgrade, Serbia. At least 20 civilian passengers were killed or declared missing, with estimates of the total death toll running as high as 60. Not all victims could be identified. It is the deadliest rail bombing in Serbian history.

The bombing occurred during Operation Allied Force, a NATO operation against the Federal Republic of Yugoslavia aimed at forcing the government to end the Kosovo War.

== Events ==
The bombing occurred at about 11.40 hours local time. An AGM-130 precision-guided munition released by a US F-15E Strike Eagle struck the centre of the bridge at the exact moment that the No. 393 passenger train, en route from Belgrade to Ristovac, was crossing the bridge. The missile struck the train, causing major damage, but did not destroy the bridge.

Comparison of gun camera footage of the Grdelica train bombing set to different speeds; the original footage was determined to have been sped up.

According to General Wesley Clark, who was the Supreme Allied Commander Europe (SACEUR) at the time, the train had been traveling too fast and the bomb was too close to the target for it to divert in time. The first missile had been fired from a significant distance from the target, and the pilot was allegedly not able to recognize the train visually. Realizing that the train had been hit but believing that he could still complete the mission by striking the end of the bridge where the train had already passed, the pilot then made another pass and fired a second missile. This one too hit the train. Clark described the second hit as an "uncanny accident" in which the train had continued moving into the target area, obscured by dust and smoke from the first strike, stating that the pilot allegedly had had less than one second to react. A gun camera video was released by NATO to support its version of the events. It was, however, discovered the video was sped up and thus not representative of the actual response time. The Pentagon and NATO stated that the error had been the result of the video being speeded up for battle damage assessment purposes, but not being slowed again for the press conference.

== Controversy ==
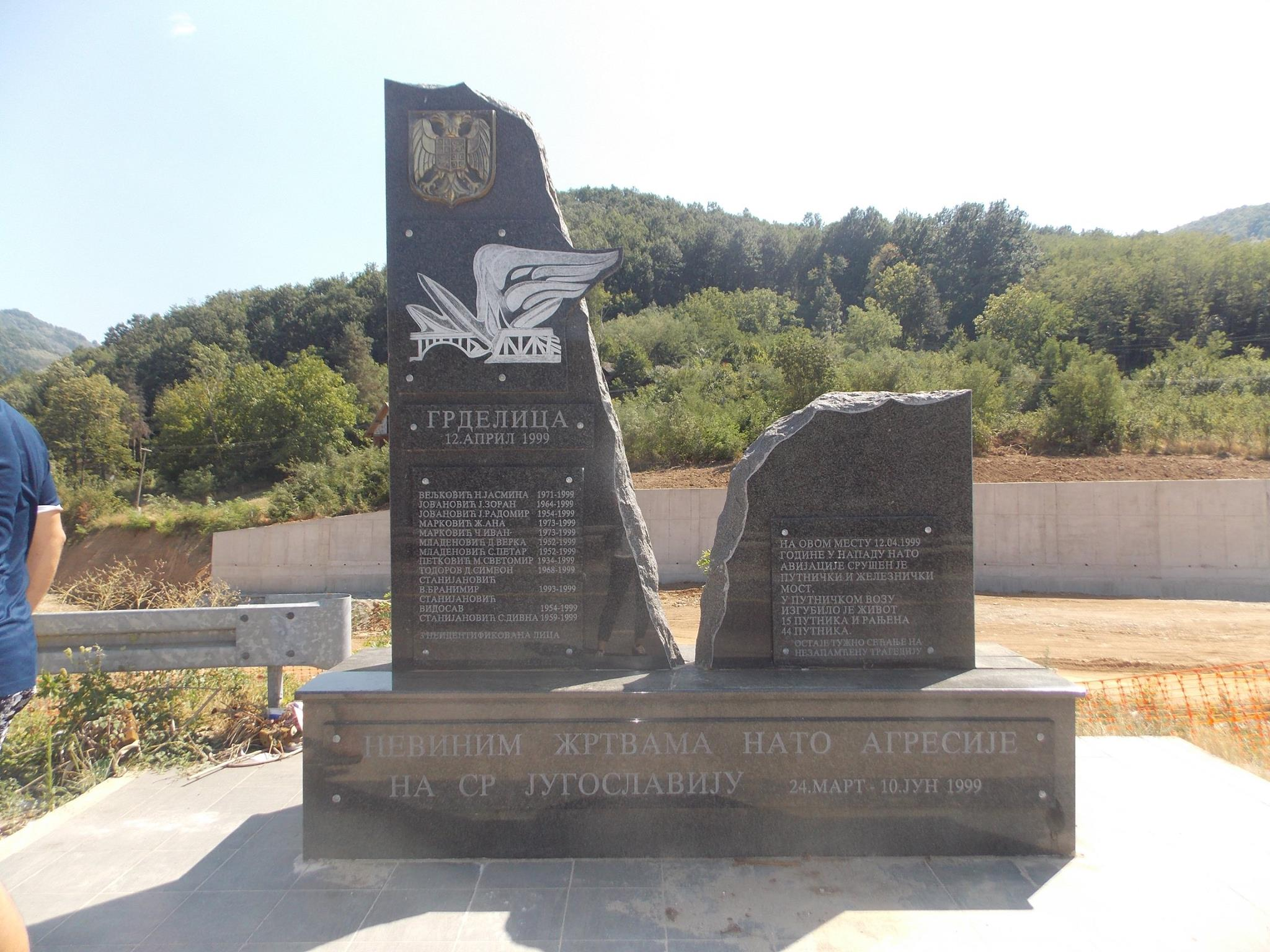
Monument to the victims

The incident caused an immediate controversy in Serbia and abroad. The Yugoslav state news agency Tanjug released an editorial that accused NATO of performing the attack with the aim of "inflicting suffering on and destroying the Serbian people". In a press conference the day after the attack, General Clark stated that "it was an unfortunate incident which he, and the crew, and all of us very much regret" and "it is one of those regrettable things that happen in a campaign like this and we are all very sorry for it, but we are doing the absolute best we can do to avoid collateral damage." The U.S. Deputy Secretary of Defense, John Hamre, told the United States Congress a few months later that "We never wanted to destroy that train or kill its occupants. We did want to destroy the bridge and we regret this accident."

The German Frankfurter Rundschau prompted a further controversy during January 2000, when it reported that the NATO video had been shown at three times its real speed, giving a misleading impression of the train's speed. The Pentagon and NATO stated that the error had been the result of the video being speeded up for battle damage assessment purposes, but not being slowed again for the press conference. Later investigation by Frankfurter Rundschau asserted that the video was sped up 4.7 times.

== Legal issues ==
The Milosevic regime and some Western groups characterised the attack as a "crime". Other human rights organisations criticised the way that the attack had been continued after the train had been struck by the first strike. Amnesty International argued that the attack should have been stopped when the train had been struck, and that the second bombing had violated the principle of proportionality. In a post-war report, Amnesty stated that the incident

"appears to have violated Article 57 of Protocol I which requires an attack to 'be cancelled or suspended if it becomes clear that the objective is a not a military one ... or that the attack may be expected to cause incidental loss of civilian life... which would be excessive in relation to the concrete and direct military advantage anticipated.' "

The International Criminal Tribunal for the Former Yugoslavia (ICTY) established a committee during May 1999 to determine whether offences against international law had been committed during the NATO campaign. In its final report to the tribunal's Prosecutor, Carla Del Ponte, the committee took the view that the attack had been proportionate:

"It is the opinion of the committee that the bridge was a legitimate military objective. The passenger train was not deliberately targeted. The person controlling the bombs, pilot or WSO, targeted the bridge and, over a very short period of time, failed to recognize the arrival of the train while the first bomb was in flight. The train was on the bridge when the bridge was targeted a second time and the bridge length has been estimated at 50 meters ... It is the opinion of the committee that the information in relation to the attack with the first bomb does not provide a sufficient basis to initiate an investigation."

The committee was divided over the question of whether the aircrew had behaved recklessly. It recommended nonetheless "that the attack on the train at Grdelica Gorge should not be investigated by the [Prosecutor]." A.P.V. Rogers comments that the committee "must have considered the first missile strike to be a legitimate action against a military objective, the inference being that any civilian casualties of that strike were not disproportionate, and that the firing of the second missile was an error of judgment in the heat of the moment."

== Aftermath ==
The damaged bridge was repaired and reopened during September 1999. On 12 April 2007 a ceremony was performed at the site to mourn the victims on the occasion of the eighth anniversary of the bombing.

== See also ==
- Varvarin bridge bombing
- Lužane bus bombing
- Koriša bombing
- NATO bombing of Albanian refugees near Gjakova
