= Lužane =

Lužane Лужане
- Village
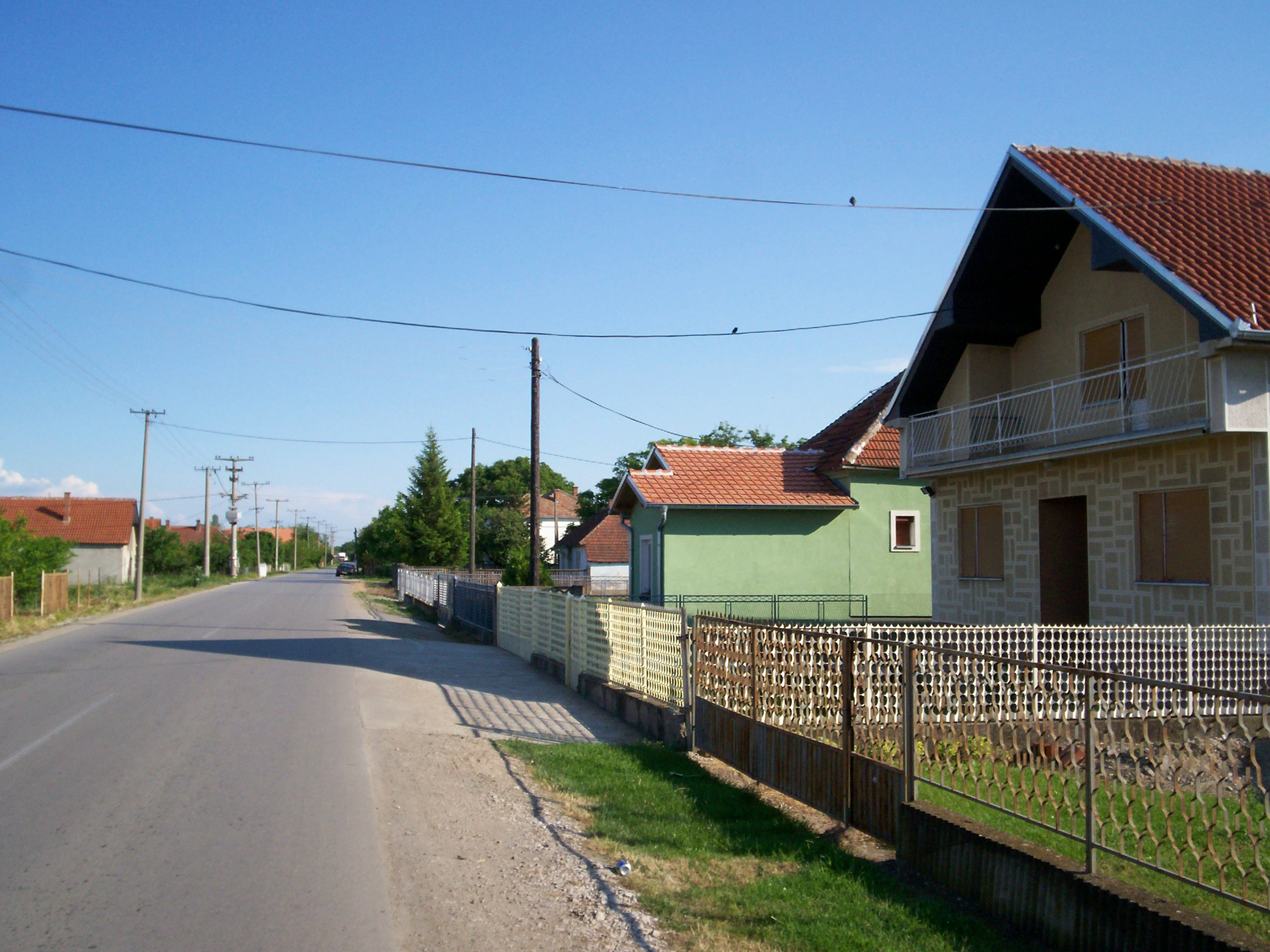
- Lužane

- Location within Serbia
- Country: Serbia
- Region: Southern and Eastern Serbia
- District: Nišava
- Municipality: Aleksinac
- Elevation: 554 ft (169 m)

Population (2002)
  - Total: 942
- Time zone: UTC+1 (CET)
  - Summer (DST): UTC+2 (CEST)

Lužane (Serbian Cyrillic: Лужане) is a village in the municipality of Aleksinac, Serbia. According to the 2002 census, the village has a population of 942 people.

== Education ==
Lužane has only one elementary school called "Vuk Karadžić". It provides education from 1st to 4th grade, and preschool. After 4th grade, kids then go to a school in Žitkovac.
