= Grdelica =

Grdelica Грделица
- Town
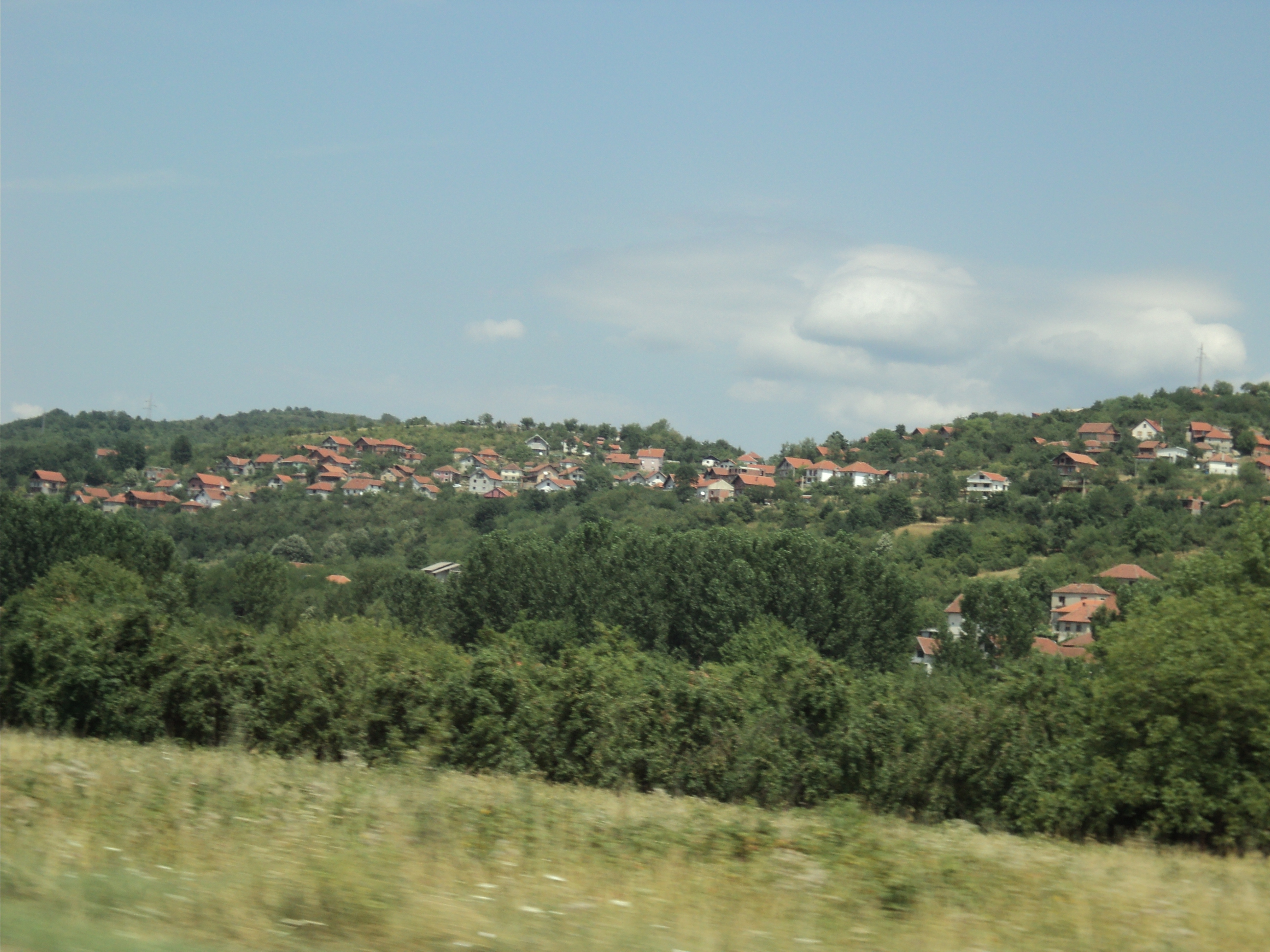

- Location within Serbia
- Coordinates: 42°53′33″N 22°04′21″E
- Country: Serbia
- District: Jablanica District
- Municipality: Leskovac

Population (2011)
  - Town: 3,194
  - Urban: 2,136
- Time zone: UTC+1 (CET)
  - Summer (DST): UTC+2 (CEST)
- Postal code: 16220
- Area code: 016
- Vehicle registration: LE

Grdelica (Serbian Cyrillic: Грделица) is a town in southern Serbia. It is situated in the Leskovac municipality, in the Jablanica District. The total population of the town was 3,194 people as of the 2011 census. For census purposes, Grdelica is divided into two adjacent parts, southern "Grdelica town" (Grdelica varoš; population 2,136) and northern "Grdelica village" (Grdelica selo; 1,058).

Grdelica lies at the South Morava river, on the mountainous terrain at the entrance of the Grdelica Gorge. It lies at an important transport route, on the main road and railway corridor linking Serbia with Macedonia and Greece. In 2016., the section around Grdelica was the last part of the A1 motorway to be completed to a full dual carriageway profile.

It is the largest settlement on the route from Leskovac to Vranje, and it was a seat of a municipality until absorbed by the Leskovac municipality in the 1960s.

Grdelica has a football stadium (the name of the football team is "FK Jedinstvo"), a basketball court and a swimming pool. "Desanka Maksimović" is the name of the primary school. Woodworks "Danilo Bošković" and "Textile Industry Grdelica (TIG)" are two major factories.

== History ==
It was part of an Iron Age culture, with 8th-century-BC pottery found in the downstream river.

== See also ==
- Grdelica train bombing
