= Jamie Shea =

Spokesperson for NATO

Jamie Shea CMG
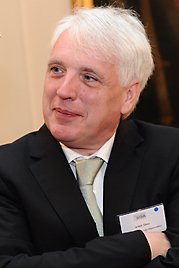
- Jamie Shea
- Born: 11 September 1953 (age 72); London, United Kingdom
- Occupation: Former Deputy Assistant Secretary General for NATO
- Children: 2

Jamie Patrick Shea (born 11 September 1953) is a retired official of NATO. He was Deputy Assistant Secretary General for Emerging Security Challenges at NATO Headquarters in Brussels, Belgium until his retirement in late September 2018.

== Biography ==
He attended Sir George Monoux Grammar School in Walthamstow, London and received his B.A. (Hons.) in Modern History and French from the University of Sussex (1977) and his D.Phil. in Modern History from Lincoln College, Oxford (1981).

He attracted attention during the Kosovo War in 1999, when he served as NATO’s spokesperson.

He began his career in NATO in 1980 as Administrator in Council Operations, before moving to Head of Youth Programmes and Head of External Relations Conferences and Seminars. Prior to his role as spokesperson for NATO, he was a speechwriter for the organization from 1991 to 1993. Subsequent duties included Director of Information and Press (October 2000–March 2003), Deputy Assistant Secretary General for External Relations (April 2003–August 2005) and Deputy Assistant Secretary General for Emerging Security Challenges from August 2005 until his retirement in September 2018.

Shea was appointed Companion of the Order of St Michael and St George (CMG) in the 2020 New Year Honours for services to diplomacy and public service.

Since 2024, he has been the host of NATO Through Time - history podcast, uploaded on NATO's YouTube channel.
