= Niš-Ekspres =

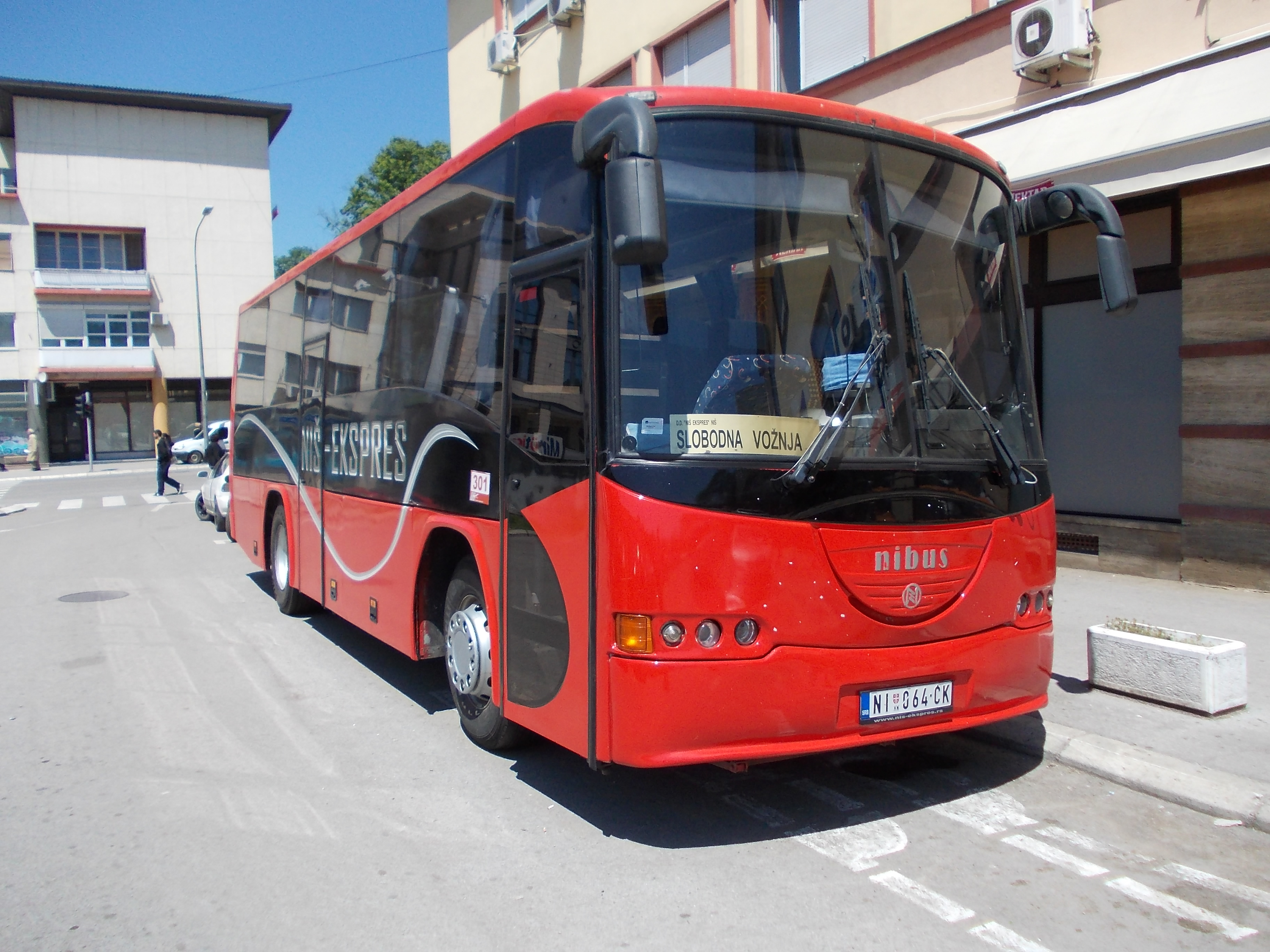
- Niš-Ekspres intercity coach in Banja Luka, Bosnia and Herzegovina
- Native name: Ниш-Експрес
- Company type: Joint-stock company
- Industry: Transportation
- Founded: 3 March 1951; 75 years ago
- Headquarters: Niš, Serbia
- Area served: Serbia, Bosnia and Herzegovina
- Key people: Zoran Jovanović (General director)
- Services: Intercity and international coach service, Local and city transit
- Revenue: ▲€33.33 million (2019)
- Net income: ▲€0.65 million (2019)
- Total assets: ▲€19.39 million (2019)
- Total equity: ▲€7.66 million (2019)
- Owner: Bokić Gojko d.o.o. (97.85%); Others (as of October 2019)
- Number of employees: 1,379 (2019)
- Website: nis-ekspres.rs
- Footnotes / references Business ID: 07133731; Tax ID: 100615493

Niš-Ekspres (full legal name: Akcionarsko društvo za saobraćajnu delatnost Niš-Ekspres Niš) is a bus company based in Niš, Serbia. Established in 1951, the company is today the largest and most-used public intercity transportation from Niš.

== History ==
The company was established on 3 March 1951 as Preduzeće za putnički saobraćaj with a fleet composed of seven buses. It started its own bus production under the name Nibus in 1996. They developed their first model, tourist coach Nibus 350 powered by MAN engine. After five years of continuous development Nibus 350 evolved into Nibus 400. In 2006, Nibus 400 won the award “Best of Serbia”.

On 1 May 1999, a bus was struck by a NATO missile during the NATO bombing of Yugoslavia. The Niš-Ekspres bus was operating on the Niš-Priština line, which is no longer operated today. The BBC reported that 23 people were killed. In terrorist bombing on 16 February 2001, 12 civilians were killed while they were on a bus.

In October 2019, the company "Bokić Gojko" d.o.o. which is owned by company's general director Zoran Jovanović, became the majority shareholder of the company after purchasing nearly 50% of shares from Belgrade-based Delta Real Estate.

== See also ==
- Transport in Serbia
