= Koriša bombing =

1999 airstrike

- Location: 42.26°N 20.80°E; Koriša, AP Kosovo, FR Yugoslavia
- Date: 13 May 1999; 11:30 P.M. (UTC+1)
- Target: Military Camp/Command Post
- Attack type: Air to ground missile attack, human shields (presumed)
- Deaths: 87–100 civilians
- Injuries: 60
- Perpetrators: NATO (presumably)
- Motive: Destroy military assets of FR Yugoslavia

On 13 May 1999, NATO aircraft bombed the village of Koriša, Kosovo during the NATO bombing of Yugoslavia. At least 87 civilians were killed and 60 wounded. NATO officials claimed before and after the bombing that the bombing was on a legitimate military target.

== Aftermath ==
After the bombing, Serbian officials took TV crews to the scene and later Serbian television showed scenes of devastation, bodies burned beyond recognition and charred tractors scattered at the scene of the attack. The government of FR Yugoslavia insisted that NATO had targeted civilians, while Kosovo Albanian survivors claimed that they had been set up by Serbian police and paramilitaries as human shields so that they would be killed by NATO bombs. Additionally, according to the International Criminal Tribunal for the former Yugoslavia, some available evidence suggests that FR Yugoslavia had used Albanian civilians as human shields and may be at least partly responsible for the civilians deaths.

== See also ==
- Civilian casualties during Operation Allied Force
