= Rrahman Rama =

Kosovar military officer

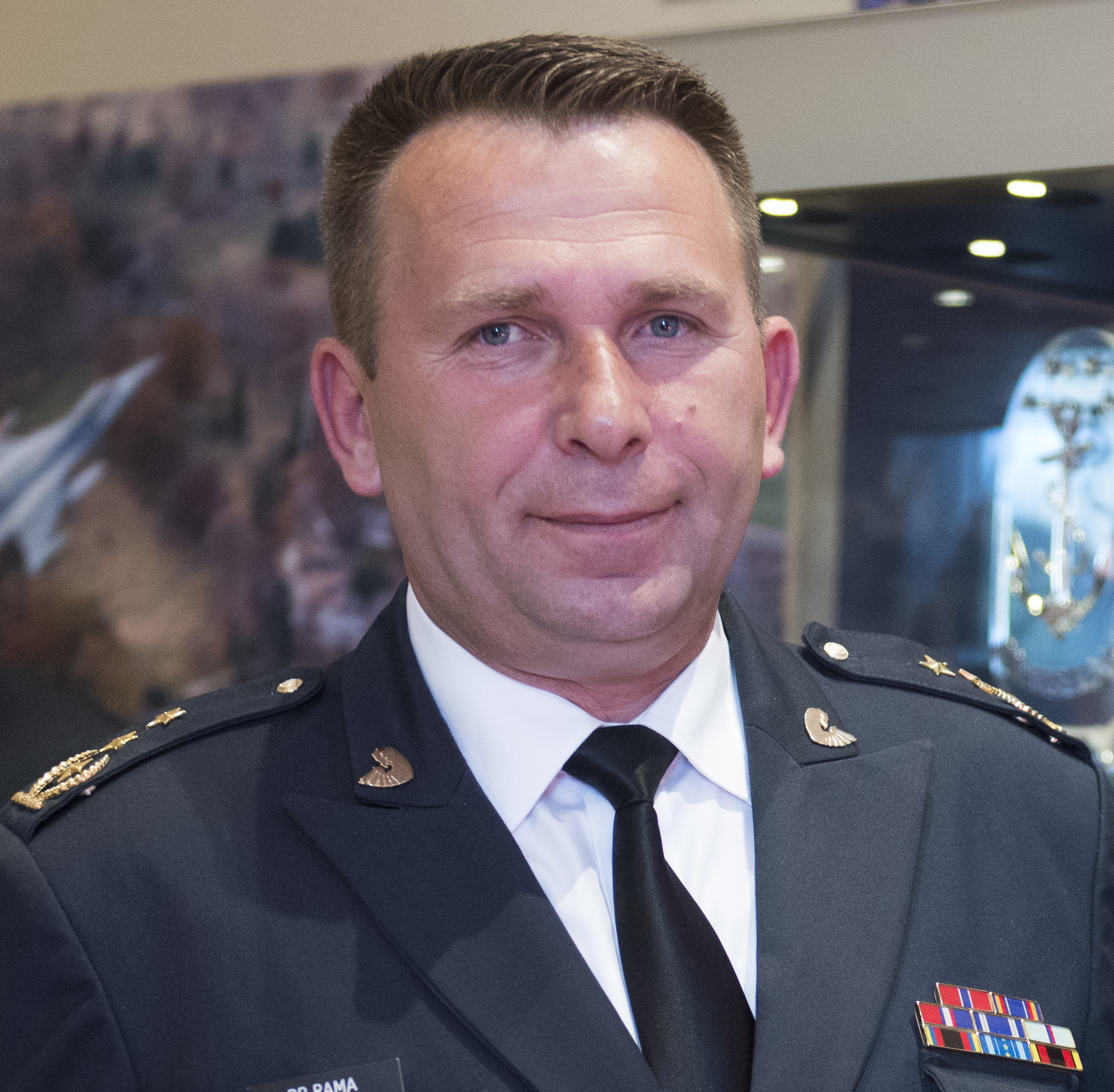
- LTG Rrahman Rama

Commander of Kosovo Security Force
- In office 18 March 2015 – 30 November 2021
- President: Atifete Jahjaga; Hashim Thaçi; Vjosa Osmani (acting); Glauk Konjufca; Vjosa Osmani
- Ministry of Defence: Haki Demolli; Rrustem Berisha; Anton Quni; Armend Mehaj
- Preceded by: Kadri Kastrati
- Succeeded by: Bashkim Jashari

Personal details
- Born: 5 June 1967 (age 58) Akrashticë, Vushtrri, SAP Kosovo, SFR Yugoslavia (present-day Kosovo)
- Profession: Military officer

Military service
- Allegiance: (Republic of Kosova) Kosovo
- Branch/service: Kosovo Liberation Army; Kosovo Protection Corps; Kosovo Security Force
- Years of service: 1998–1999, 2000–2009, 2009–2021
- Rank: Lieutenant General

Rrahman Rama is a Kosovar politician, and the former Lieutenant General Commander of the Kosovo Security Force from 18 March 2015 to 30 November 2021. Since 2025, he now serves as a member of the Assembly of the Republic of Kosovo.

== Military career ==
In 2015, Rama was made the new Commander of the Kosovo Security Force by Presidential Decree, issued by President Atifete Jahjaga.

In 2020, Rama met with Macedonian President Stevo Pendarovski in Skopje. Rama supported North Macedonia's NATO membership claiming it would have a positive impact on the stability and prosperity of the entire region.

During an interview with Radio Kosova e Lirë, Rrahman Rama said the transformation of the Kosovo Security Force into Kosovo Armed Forces is a process that has started in cooperation with international partners.

On November 30, 2021, Rrahman Rama resigned from the post of Commander of Kosovo Security Force, being replaced by the nephew of the Kosovo Liberation Army founder Adem Jashari, Bashkim Jashari, who is at the same time the son of his aunt.
