= Ejup Maqedonci =

Kosovan Minister of Defense

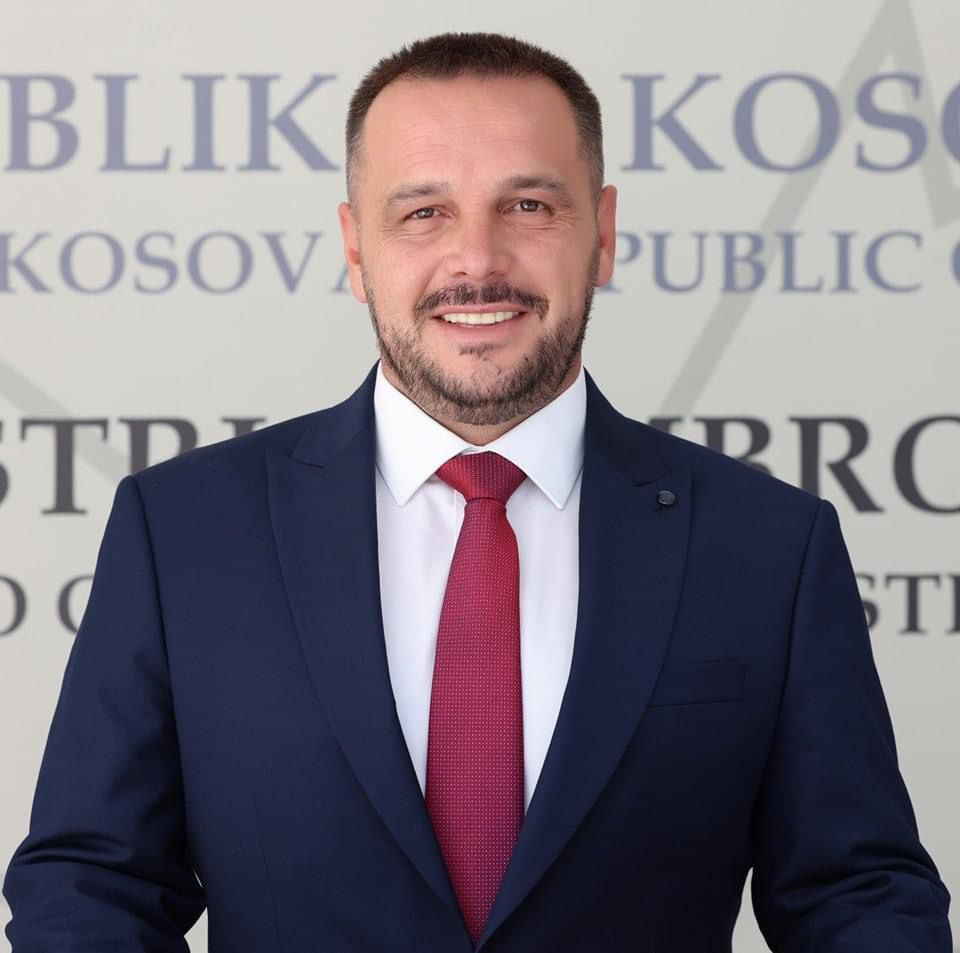
- Maqedonci in 2023

Minister of Defense of Kosovo
- Incumbent
- Assumed office 8 August 2023
- President: Vjosa Osmani; Albulena Haxhiu (acting); Justina Shiroka Pula
- Prime Minister: Albin Kurti
- Preceded by: Armend Mehaj

Personal details
- Born: Ejup Maqedonci; 9 May 1977 (age 49) Pristina, SAP Kosovo, SFR Yugoslavia (present-day Kosovo)
- Education: 1) United States Army Command and General Staff College; 2) The United States Army War College

Military service
- Allegiance: Kosovo
- Branch/service: Kosovo Liberation Army; Kosovo Protection Corps; Kosovo Security Force
- Years of service: 1998–1999, 1999–2009, 2009–2023
- Rank: Colonel
- Battles/wars: Kosovo War

Ejup Maqedonci (born 9 May 1977) is a Kosovar career officer and colonel and serves as the Minister of Defense of Kosovo since 8 August 2023.

Born in Pristina, Kosovo, Maqedonci migrated to Switzerland in 1996. After the start of the Kosovo War in 1998, Maqedonci went to Albania for military training and afterwards returned to Kosovo and joined the ranks of the Kosovo Liberation Army. He served in the 153rd Brigade of the Llapi Operative Zone.

After the end of the Kosovo War, Maqedonci joined the Kosovo Protection Corps, where he led the Search and Rescue Battalion until 2009. He joined the newly formed Kosovo Security Force (KSF) in 2009. From 2014 to 2019 he led the Rapid Reaction Brigade of the KSF. In 2019 he was appointed Head of the Department of Operations and Training at the General Staff of KSF. On July 10, 2023, Maqedonci retired from the KSF and was appointed Minister of Defense on August 8 of the same year.

Maqedonci did his military training in Albania, United Kingdom, Germany, Japan, and United States. He holds a master's degree in Military Arts and Science from the U.S. Army Command and General Staff College, and a Master of Strategic Studies from the United States Army War College.

In October 2025, Ejup Maqedonci was inducted into the Hall of Fame of the United States Army War College in Carlisle, Pennsylvania. In January 2026, he was also inducted into the Hall of Fame of the United States Army Command and General Staff College in Fort Leavenworth, Kansas.

Maqedonci is an honorary citizen of Leavenworth. He is married and has three daughters.
