= Sylejman Selimi =

Kosovar general; convicted war criminal

Commander of Kosovo Security Force
- In office 16 June 2009 – 22 November 2011
- President: Fatmir Sejdiu; Jakup Krasniqi (acting); Behgjet Pacolli; Jakup Krasniqi (acting); Atifete Jahjaga
- Prime Minister: Hashim Thaçi
- Ministry of the KSF: Fehmi Mujota; Agim Çeku
- Preceded by: Office established
- Succeeded by: Kadri Kastrati

Commander of Kosovo Protection Corps
- In office 10 March 2006 – 16 June 2009
- President: Fatmir Sejdiu
- Prime Minister: Agim Çeku; Hashim Thaçi
- Preceded by: Agim Çeku
- Succeeded by: Office abolished

Personal details
- Born: 25 September 1970 (age 55) Açarevë, Skenderaj, SFR Yugoslavia

Military service
- Allegiance: Kosovo
- Branch/service: Kosovo Liberation Army; Kosovo Protection Corps; Kosovo Security Force
- Years of service: 1991–1999, 1999–2009, 2009–2011
- Rank: Military commander
- Wars and battles: Insurgency in Kosovo (1995–1998); Kosovo War; Central Drenica offensive

Sylejman Selimi (born September 25, 1970) is the former commander of the Kosovo Liberation Army, who was convicted of war crimes for the torture and inhuman treatment of prisoners at the Likovac detention center during the Kosovo War. After the war, he served as commander of the Security Force of the Republic of Kosovo; he left this position in 2011 and became the ambassador to Albania.

== Early life ==
Selimi was born on September 25, 1970, in the village of Açarevë, Drenica, into an Albanian family. His family originates from the Gashi tribe (fis). He finished primary education in his home town, attended his high school in Kline and finished his studies at the Faculty of Mining and Metallurgy in Kosovska Mitrovica. He was a football player for KF Drenica.

== Career ==
- 1991 – 1997: Cell recruitment on Kosovo Liberation Army (UÇK)
- 1998 – 1998: Commander of UÇK in Drenica Operational Area
- 1998 – 1999: General commander of UÇK
- 1999 – 2000: Commander of Kosova Guard
- 2000 – 2006: Deputy commander of Kosovo Protection Corps
- 2006 – 2009: Commander of Kosovo Protection Corps
- 2009 – 2011: Commander of Kosovo Security Force

== History ==
Prior to the Kosovo Security force, Selimi was commander of its predecessor, the Kosovo Protection Corps. On 19 December 2008, Selimi was appointed commander of the Kosovo Security force by Prime Minister Hashim Thaçi.

During the Insurgency in Kosovo and the subsequently intense Kosovo War, he was the commander of Kosovo Liberation Army, an ethnic-Albanian paramilitary organisation that sought the separation of Kosovo from the Federal Republic of Yugoslavia (FRY) during the 1990s and the eventual creation of a Greater Albania. Despite his noted contributions as the primary commander of the KLA, his lack of military experience inflicted heavy losses on the KLA's initial campaign. Due to these severe losses, he would later be replaced by the Croatian Army veteran, Agim Çeku.

Selimi insisted:

There is de facto Albanian nation. The tragedy is that European powers after World War I decided to divide that nation between several Balkan states. We are now fighting to unify the nation, to liberate all Albanians, including those in Macedonia, Montenegro, and other parts of Serbia. We are not just a liberation army for Kosovo.

== War crimes ==
Selimi was convicted by Kosovo courts of torturing a civilian prisoner at a KLA detention camp in Likovc/Likovac. He received an eight-year prison sentence but later the court cut his sentence to seven years and was conditionally released in January 2019. Kosovo politicians celebrated his release, with President Hashim Thaçi stating: "Kosovo is better and safer with the living hero Sylejman Selimi at liberty." His appointment was criticised by the U.S. ambassador to Kosovo Philip S. Kosnett who stated "Convicted war criminals have no place in Kosovo's government"

== See also ==
- Military of Kosovo
