= Kosovo Defense Academy =

Military academy in Pristina, Kosovo

- Akademia e Mbrojtjes se Kosoves
- Motto: Officium, Honor, Patria
- Motto in English: Duty, Honor, Country
- Type: Military
- Established: 1998
- Founder: GEN Bekim Berisha
- Parent institution: Command of Doctrine and Training
- Academic affiliations: MAJ Mimoza Budeci
- Superintendent: BG Jeton Dreshaj
- Students: ~88 cadets
- Location: Kosovo, 10000
- Language: English Albanian
- Website: am.fsk-rks.org

Center for University Studies (simply known as Kosovo Defense Academy) is a military academy located in Pristina, Kosovo. Established in 2005, it is the only military academy that serves in the Republic of Kosovo and that produces military officers for the Kosovo Security Force.

== Educational program ==
The Defense Academy of Kosovo hosts these level of education and trainings:

- Undergraduate academic studies
- Officers' School
- Preparatory School

=== Undergraduate academic studies ===
Kosovo Defense Academy has a separated system of education, while the cadets live and train in the barracks they attend a private civilian university known as Rochester Institute of Kosovo (American University of Kosova) with fully covered tuition where they graduate with a BA Degree in the field that they have chosen to study.

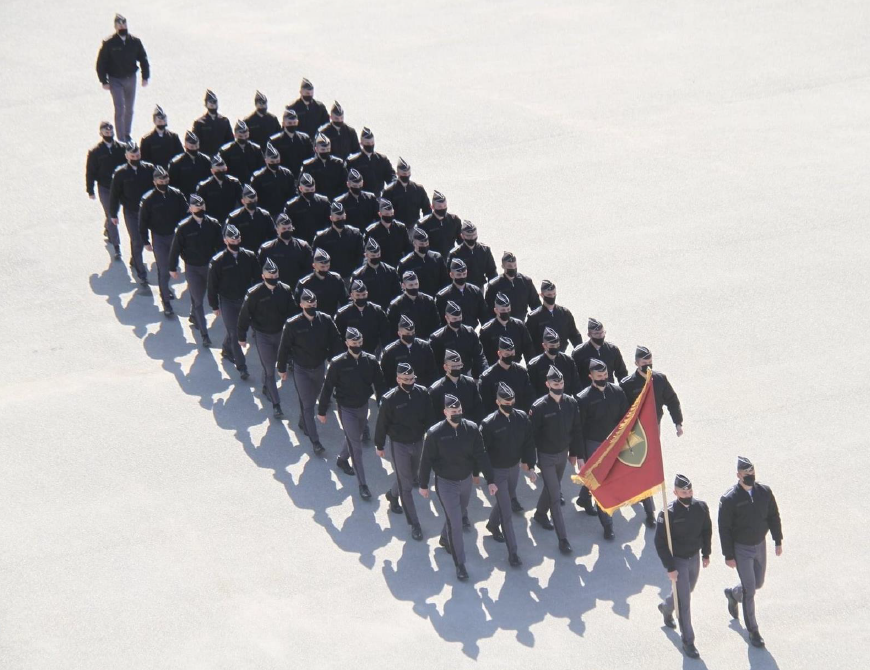

=== Officers school ===
Kosovo Defense Academy has a department in which NCO's receive four months of special training and become new officers (2LT). The competing candidates must have at least BA degree from a university in a certain field. Also this school trains officers for promotion all the way to the rank of Major (OF3).

=== Preparatory school ===
Kosovo Defense Academy has organised preparatory school for different foreign academies candidates, thus strengthening their physical abilities and academic knowledge by attending RIT with different classes.

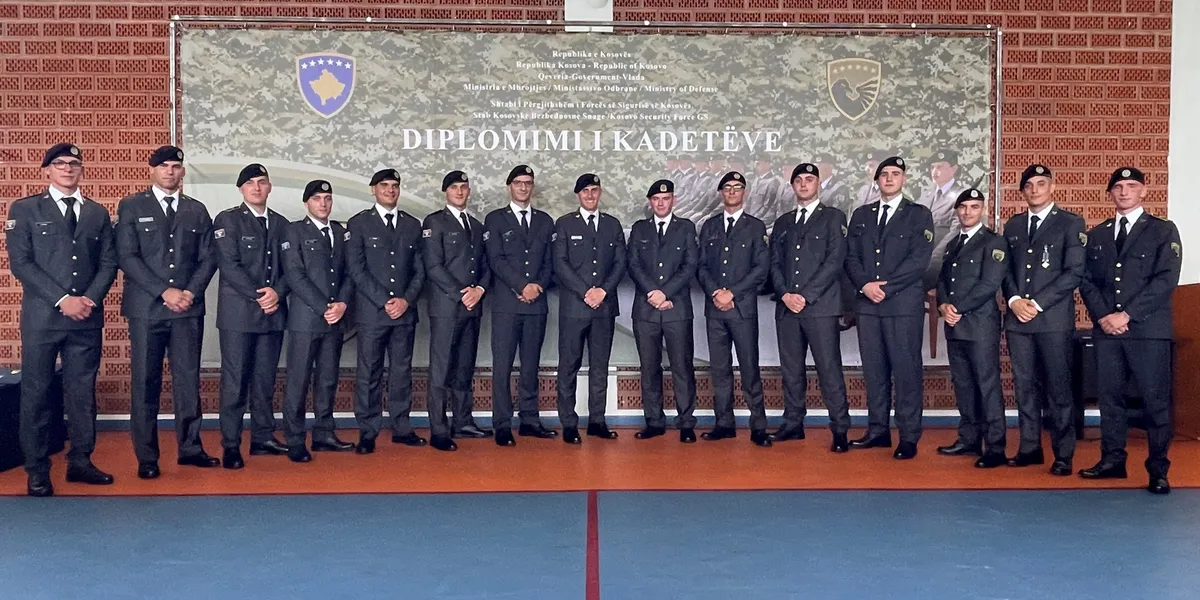
Graduating class of 2021

== Campus ==
Campus is located in Prsitina, inside the Adem Jashari Barracks.

== International cooperation ==
Since 2025 cadets from Kosovo Defense Academy are exchanged with cadets from Royal Military College of Canada, Saint-Jean. This was made possible after an agreement between Commander of KSF LTGEN Bashkim Jashari and a high officer from Canadian Royal Armed Forces.

Kosovo's cadets have participated in different conferences and competitions held in the United States Military Academy at West Point such as Sandhurst Competition.

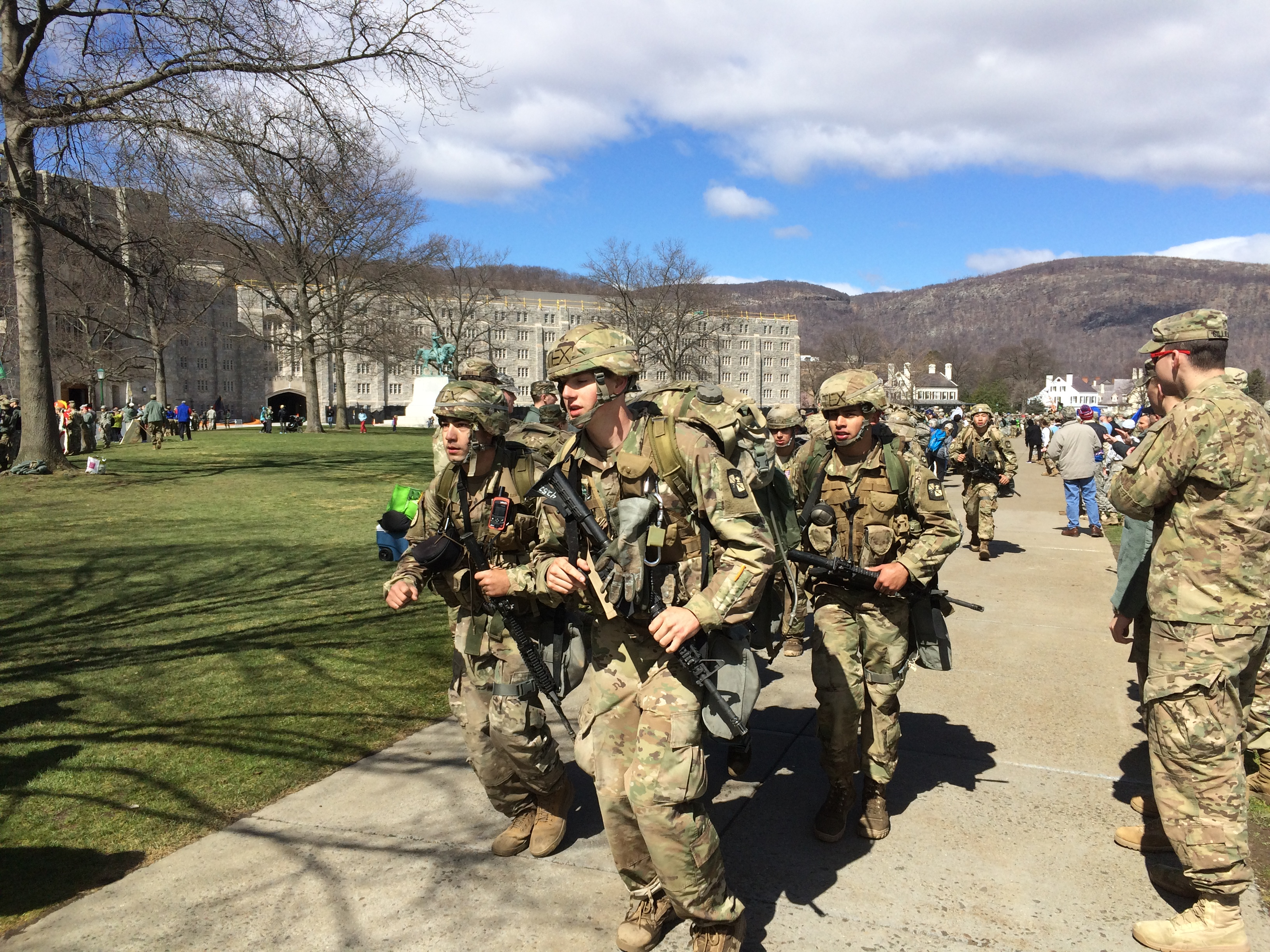
What Sandhurst Competition in United States Military Academy at West Point looks like, where Kosovan cadets participated in 2025.

In 2024, Kosovo Defense Academy held the International Cadets week, welcoming cadets from different military academies from around the world, Norwich Military Academy from the US, Macedonian Defense Academy, Turkish Defense Academy, Albanian Defense Academy, Croatian Defense Academy and Royal Military Academy of Canada. This helped international cadets learn more about Kosovo, its history, culture and nature.

== Traditions ==
Kosovo Defense Academy Corp of Cadets has different traditions.

=== Class motto design ===
Each class creates its own design of their flag with their own motto which will represent them during the studying years in the academy.

=== The Epopee Run 4x5x59 ===
During 5,6 and 7 March of each year, Corp of Cadets organizes a run starting on 5 March at 0500 with 4km run and then proceeded with another 4km run after every five hours, the final round concludes with a 7km run on 7 March at 2000. Thus cadets commemorate the sacrifice of the legendary KLA Commander Adem Jashari and his family of 59. Also the civilians are encouraged to participate in this run.

=== Ring ceremony ===
Corp of Cadets receive their class rings during a certain year of their studies with national military symbols and graduating class year.

== History ==
The first military academy established in Kosovo was created before the liberation war in Kosovo by the three-war General Bekim Berisha in Aqareva, Skenderaj, also known as the Military Academy of Kosovo Liberation Army.

After the war, in 2005 Kosovo Protection Corps with the help of the US Military established the Kosovo Defense Academy, using the system of the Citadel Military College which is also present in this day. The first graduating class from the Kosovo Defense Academy is the class of 2009, producing the very first officers for the needs of KSF.

== ISOMA 2025 ==
International Symposium of Military Academies was held by Kosovo Defense Academy in November 2025, welcoming cadets, officers and civilians from different countries of the world with the motto "Unite for Knowledge, Act for Peace".

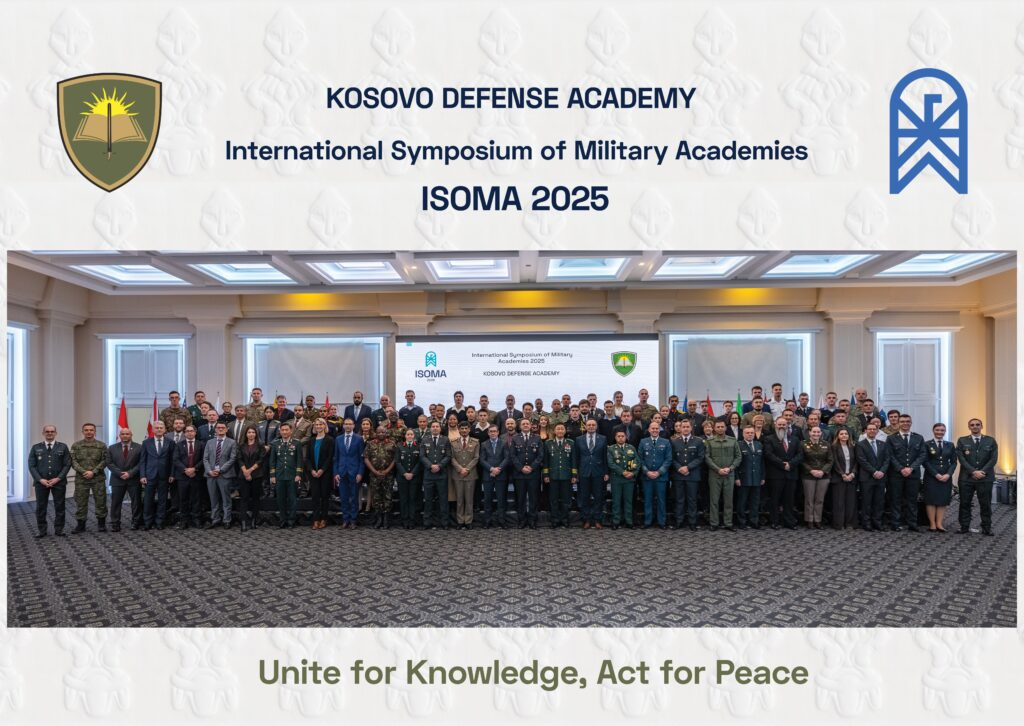
