= Kosovo Security Force Band =

- Orkestra e Forcës së Sigurisë të Kosovës
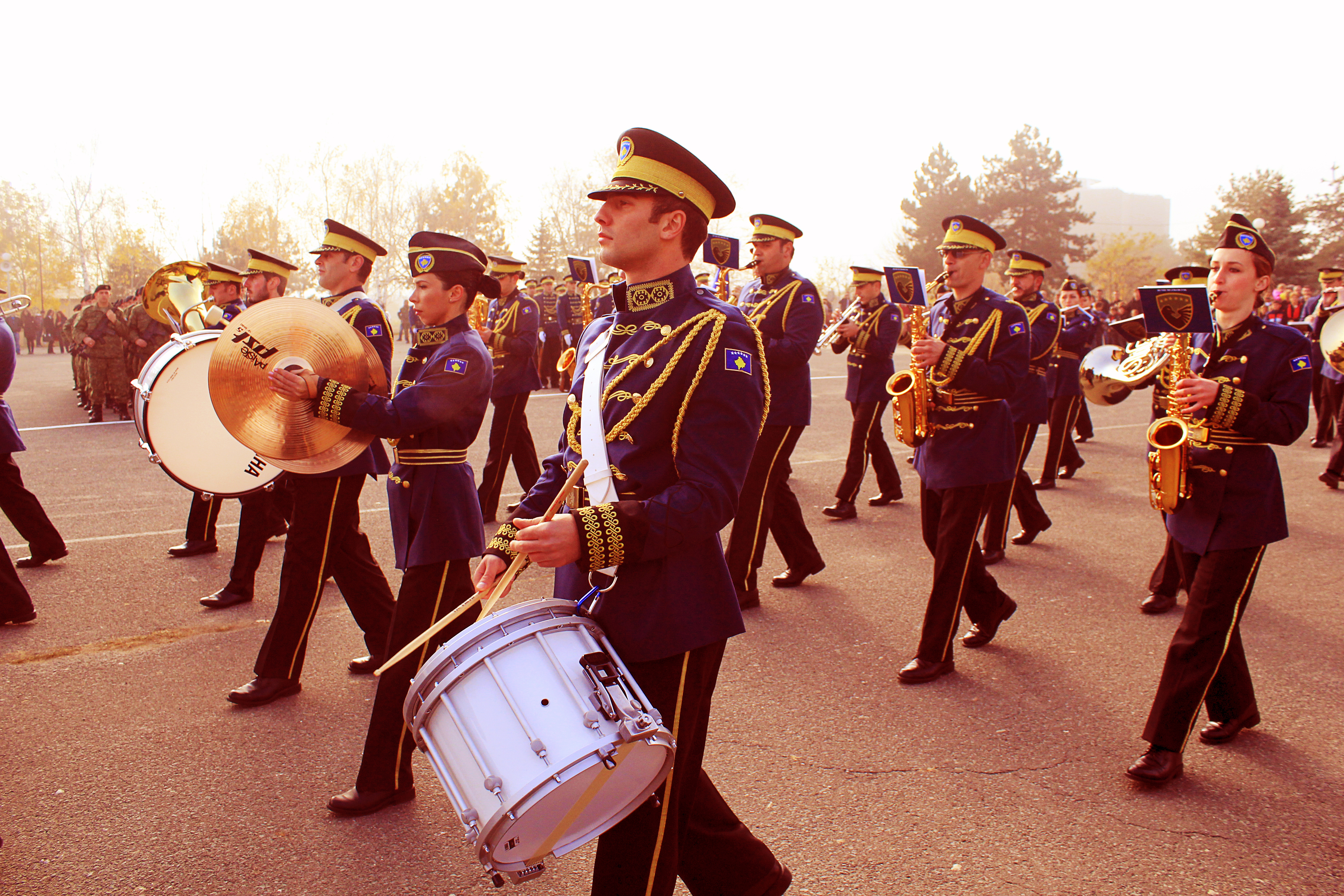
- The band marching in November 2012
- Active: 2003; 23 years ago as Kosovo Protection Corps Band; 2009; 17 years ago as Kosovo Security Force Band
- Country: Kosovo
- Branch: Kosovo Security Force
- Type: Military band
- Role: Public duties
- Garrison/HQ: Pristina, Kosovo
- Current form: 14 December 2018; 7 years ago (Note: In the process of moving from Kosovo Security Force to Kosovo Armed Forces.)

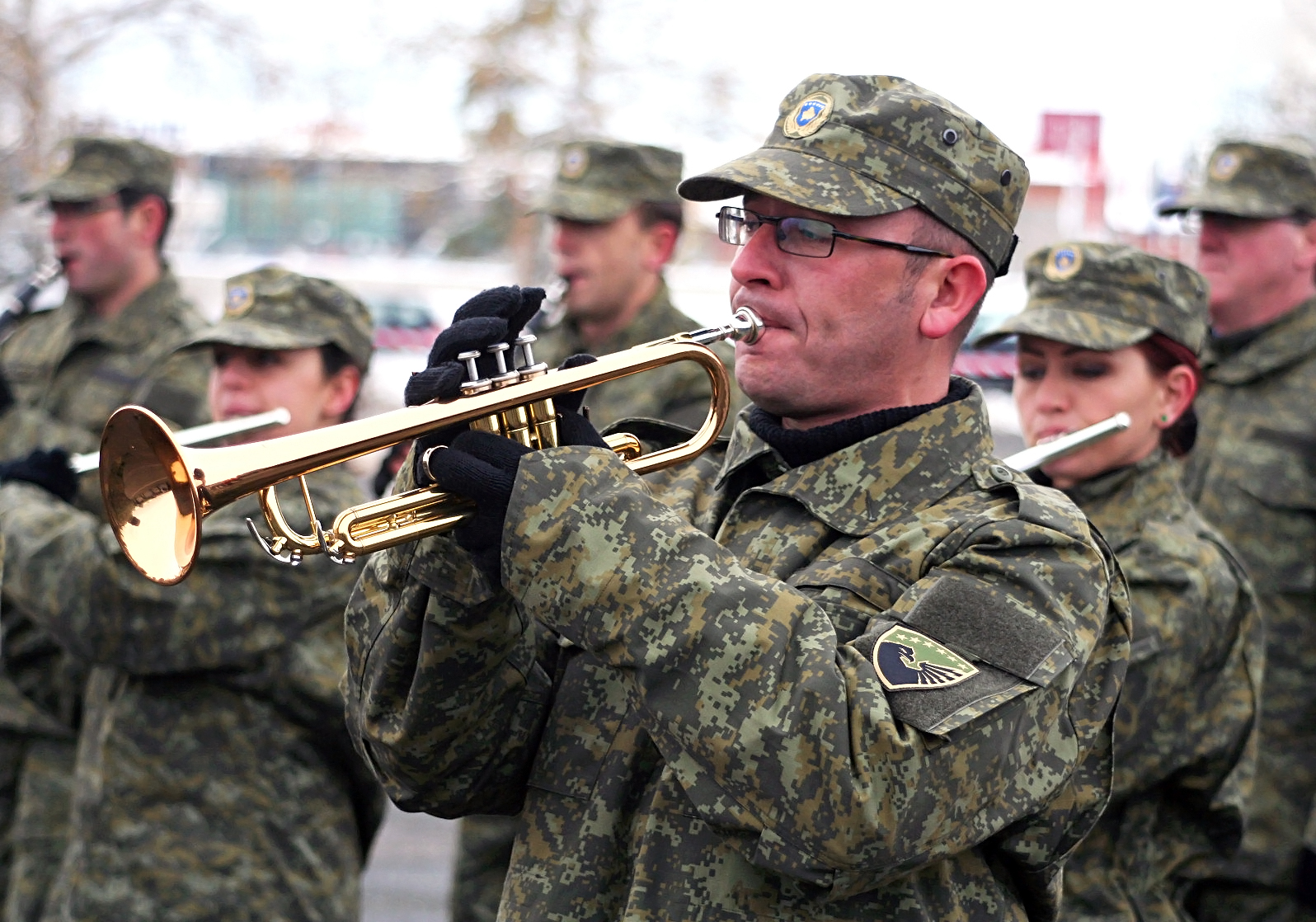
A trumpet player with the band during an army day celebration at Adem Jashari Barracks.

The Kosovo Security Force Band (Albanian: Orkestra e Forcës së Sigurisë të Kosovës; Serbian: Оркестар Косовске безбедносне снаге, romanized: Orkestar Kosovske bezbednosnih snage) is a professional military band from the Republic of Kosovo. It performs on all public holidays in the republic, including Independence Day, Constitution Day, and Europe Day. It coordinates with the FSK Ceremonial Guard to participate in ceremonial events.

Taps (in the key of B flat)
The type of bugle call that Kosovo Security Force Band plays on mourning and memorial occasions

== History ==
The Kosovar KSF Band was founded in 2003 as part of the country's Protection Corps until it was transferred to the KSF in 2009. In 2014, distinctive ceremonial uniforms were authorized. It has performed jointly with bands from NATO, the United States National Guard and the European Union.

== See also ==
- Serbian Guards Unit Band
- Albanian Armed Forces Band
- Honour Guard Company (Montenegro)
