= Haki Demolli =

Kosovar professor and politician

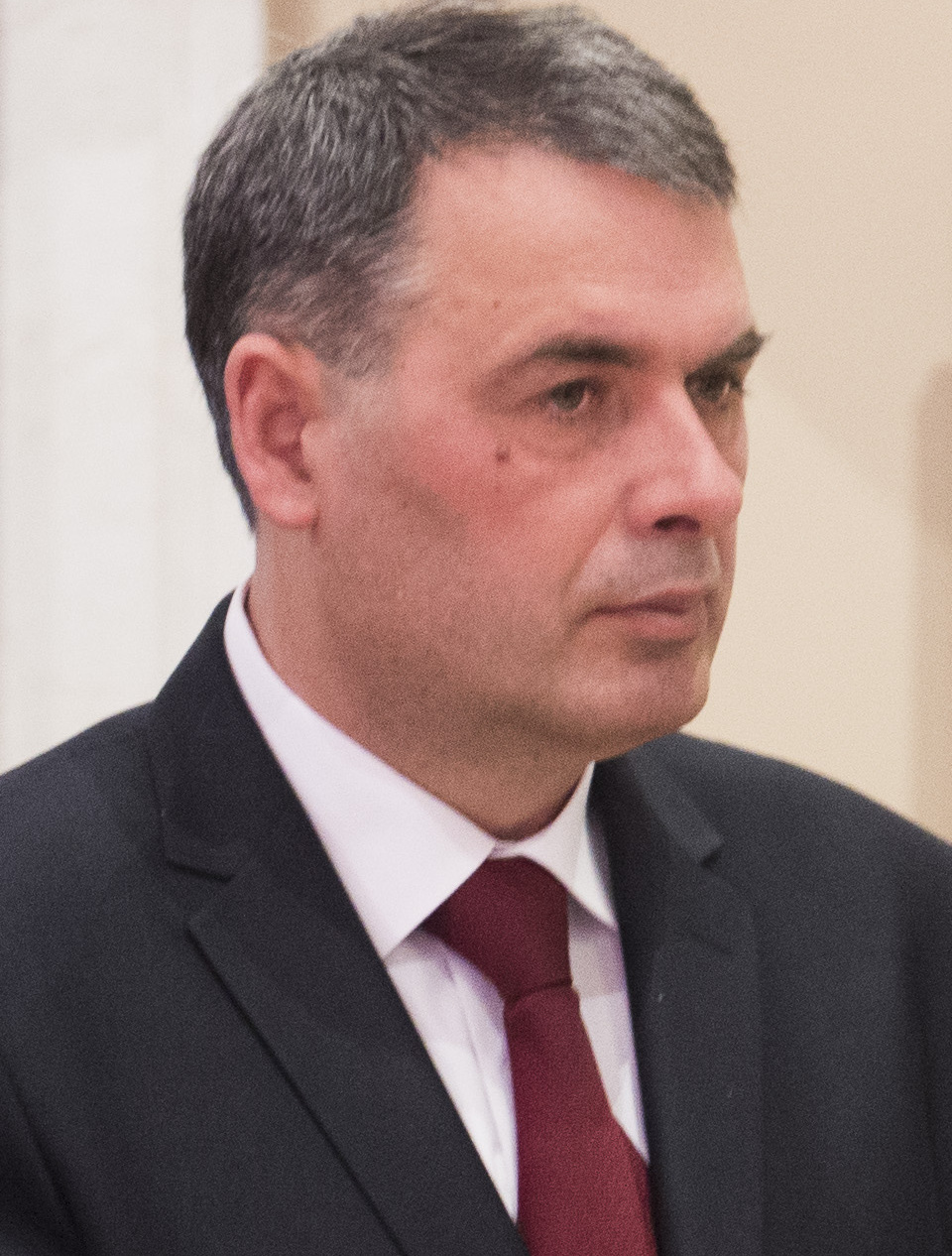
- Haki Demolli, 2016

Minister of the Kosovo Security Force
- In office 9 December 2014 – 9 September 2017
- President: Atifete Jahjaga; Hashim Thaçi
- Prime Minister: Isa Mustafa
- Preceded by: Agim Çeku
- Succeeded by: Rrustem Berisha

Member of the Assembly of the Republic of Kosovo
- In office 2011 – 9 September 2017
- President: Atifete Jahjaga; Hashim Thaçi
- Prime Minister: Hashim Thaçi; Isa Mustafa

Minister of Justice of Kosovo
- In office 31 March 2010 – 18 October 2010
- President: Fatmir Sejdiu; Jakup Krasniqi (acting)
- Prime Minister: Hashim Thaçi
- Preceded by: Nekibe Kelmendi
- Succeeded by: Hajredin Kuçi

Vice-president of Football Federation of Kosovo
- In office 2004–2008 Serving with Agim Ademi
- President: Sabri Hashani
- Preceded by: Adem Çollakaj; Afërdita Fazlija
- Succeeded by: Bekim Haxhiu; Predrag Jović

Personal details
- Born: 17 February 1963 (age 63) Pristina, SFR Yugoslavia (present-day Kosovo)
- Party: Democratic League
- Children: 3
- Education: University of Prishtina Faculty of Law
- Occupation: Politician, lawyer, professor

Haki Demolli (born February 17, 1963) is a Kosovo Albanian politician, lawyer, and professor. He served as the Minister of the Kosovo Security Force from 2014 to 2017 and as Kosovo's Minister of Justice in 2010.

== Early life ==
Haki Demolli was born in Pristina, SFR Yugoslavia on 17 February 1963.

In 1985, Demolli graduated from the University of Prishtina Faculty of Law.

From 1986 to 1987, Demolli interned at the Prishtina District Court.

In 1978, Demolli began lecturing at the University of Prishtina Faculty of Law. He continues to lecture there today.

From September 1999 to April 2003, Demolli lectured at the Kosovo Police Service School (now the Kosovo Centre for Public Safety Education and Development) in Vushtrria.

From 2000 to 2008, Demolli was the vice president of the Football Federation of Kosovo.

In 2001, Demolli a doctorate from the University of Prishtina Faculty of Law.

From May 2003 to 2010, Demolli was the director of the Kosovo Law Center, a non-governmental organization.

From 2005 to 2008, Demolli was part of the steering committee for the University of Prishtina.

Demolli published three books in 2002, 2006, and 2009.

== Political career ==
On 31 March 2010, Demolli was announced as Kosovo's Minister of Justice, replacing Nekibe Kelmendi. He continued in this position until 18 October 2010.

In Kosovo's 2010 elections, Demolli won a seat in the Assembly of the Republic of Kosovo for a term beginning in 2011. During his time in the Fourth Legislature, he was the Chairman of the Committee for Electoral Reform and a member of the Oversight Committee for the Kosovo Intelligence Agency.

In 2014, Demolli won reelection to the Assembly and was appointed the Minister of the Kosovo Security Force.

On 9 September 2017, Demolli was replaced by Rrustem Berisha as Minister of the Kosovo Security Force.
