= Agim Çeku =

Kosovar military commander and politician

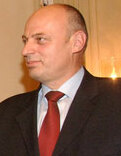
- Çeku in 2006

Minister of the Kosovo Security Force
- In office 22 February 2011 – 9 December 2014
- President: Hashim Thaçi
- Prime Minister: Isa Mustafa
- Preceded by: Fehmi Mujota
- Succeeded by: Haki Demolli

Prime Minister of Kosovo
- In office 10 March 2006 – 9 January 2008
- President: Fatmir Sejdiu
- Preceded by: Bajram Kosumi
- Succeeded by: Hashim Thaçi

Personal details
- Born: 29 October 1960 (age 66) Ćuška, Kosovo, PR Serbia, FPR Yugoslavia (now Kosovo)
- Party: Democratic Party (from 2013)
- Other political affiliations: Social Democratic Party (2008–2013); Independent (until 2008)
- Nickname: Commander Scorched Earth (named by the Croats)

Military service
- Allegiance: Yugoslavia (until 1991); Croatia; Kosovo
- Branch/service: Yugoslav People's Army; Croatian Army; Kosovo Liberation Army (UÇK); Kosovo Protection Corps (TMK); Kosovo Security Force (FSK)
- Rank: Military Commander
- Battles/wars: Yugoslav Wars; Croatian War of Independence; Battle of Gospić; Operation Maslenica; Operation Medak Pocket; Operation Storm; Operation Mistral 2; Kosovo War; NATO bombing of Yugoslavia; Battle of Paštrik

Agim Çeku (Serbo-Croatian: Agim Čeku; Агим Чеку, born 29 October 1960) is an ethnic Albanian politician from Kosovo, the former minister of Security Forces in Kosovo and formerly the prime minister. Of military background, he was a commander of the Kosovo Liberation Army (KLA) that fought against Yugoslav rule in 1998–1999, earlier being a commander in the Croatian War of Independence in the Croatian Army.

Çeku served as an officer in the Croatian Army during the Croatian War of Independence and was military commander of the KLA during the 1998–1999 Kosovo War, and then commanded the Kosovo Protection Corps under the United Nations Interim Administration Mission in Kosovo.

== Early life ==
Çeku was born in Qyshk, a village near Peja, at the time part of the Socialist Autonomous Province of Kosovo of SR Serbia, SFR Yugoslavia.

== Military career ==
Çeku completed the secondary military school in Belgrade, and then attended the Zadar Military Academy. Shortly afterwards, he joined the Yugoslav People's Army (JNA) as an artillery captain. In 1991 the Yugoslav wars broke out and he deserted from the JNA and joined the Croatian National Guard (which transformed into the Croatian Army), when the Republic of Croatia fought a war in breaking away from Yugoslavia. The Croatian Army fought the Serb breakaway Republic of Serbian Krajina. He participated in several military operations, first in Operation Maslenica when he was the head of Velebit's artillery section, Operation Medak Pocket near Gospić, in which he was wounded, and Operation Storm in August 1995 that captured most of the Krajina territory. Subsequently, he continued the advance as head of Croatian forces into the Republic of Bosnia and Herzegovina fighting in western Bosnia against the forces of the Serb Republic in Operation Mistral 2.

After the war the Croatian Army was reformed and President Franjo Tuđman named Çeku commanding officer of the Fifth District Region in Rijeka. In 1998, he filed a request for retirement in order to go to Kosovo to join the ethnic Albanian Kosovo Liberation Army (KLA) that fought Serbian rule, which was officially fulfilled in February 1999 with his resignation.

== Kosovo War ==
Çeku had developed contacts with the KLA in the mid-1990s. When war broke out in Kosovo, the KLA initially did very badly against the Yugoslav forces, due in part to poor leadership under senior commander Sylejman Selimi, a militarily inexperienced individual who had been given the post largely because of his influence in the Drenica region (the KLA's heartland).

In May 1999, Çeku was appointed the KLA's chief of staff, replacing Selimi. He immediately set about reorganising the KLA and implementing a proper military structure within the organization. In the closing days of the Kosovo War, the KLA began providing systematic intelligence to NATO as well as mounting attacks to lure Serbian forces into the open, enabling NATO warplanes to bomb them. According to reports at the time, Çeku was the principal liaison between NATO and the KLA.

== Kosovo Protection Corps ==
Following the end of the war in June 1999, Çeku oversaw the demilitarisation of the KLA and its transformation into the Kosovo Protection Corps (KPC), an ostensibly civilian organization charged with disaster response, demining, search and response and humanitarian projects. Although the international community insisted the KPC was a civilian organization, Çeku and its membership said they believed the KPC should evolve into the future army of an independent Kosovo. Çeku managed ably many difficult challenges for the KPC, including allegations that its members were supporting the ethnic Albanian insurgency in Macedonia in 2001.

== Political career ==
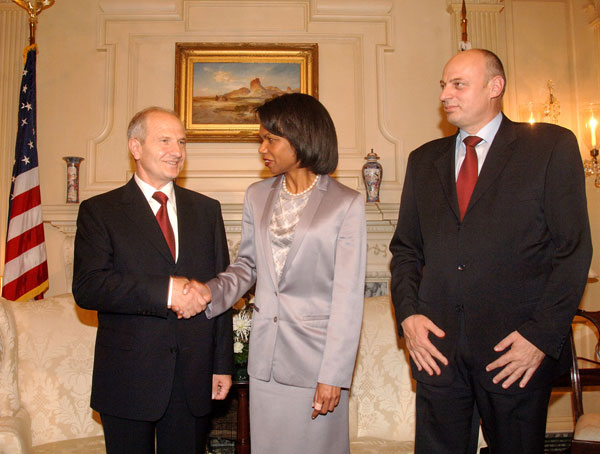
Agim Çeku with the United States Secretary of State, Condoleezza Rice and the president of the Republic of Kosovo, Fatmir Sejdiu

On 10 March 2006, Çeku was elected Prime Minister of Kosovo by the Kosovo Assembly. After being sworn in, he declared his support for Kosovo independence, whilst promising to protect the rights of the Serbian minority. Çeku's appointment was backed by former Prime Minister Ramush Haradinaj, who resigned in early 2005 after the ICTY had indicted him for war crimes. In his first one hundred days in office, Çeku prioritized the implementation of the UN-endorsed "Standards" for good governance and multi-ethnicity, earning praise from UN Kosovo chief Søren Jessen-Petersen and Contact Group countries. On 24 July 2006, Çeku traveled to Vienna for the first high-level meeting between the Presidents and Prime Ministers of Serbia and Kosovo to discuss Kosovo's future status.

He stated that he would found a new political party after stepping down as PM, dispelling rumours that he would join the Reformist Party ORA. However, he joined the Social Democratic Party of Kosovo on 10 April 2008, and did not rule out that the party would unify with ORA.

On 23 February 2011, Çeku was made Minister of Security Forces of Kosovo.

== War crimes accusations ==
The Serbian government has accused Çeku of war crimes. Although Çeku has not been the subject of any ICTY indictment, he was briefly detained in Slovenia in October 2003 and in Hungary in March 2004 on the basis of an Interpol warrant issued by Serbia. The ICTY issued the last indictments in late 2004 and limited all further investigations to ongoing cases only.

In May 2009, Colombian authorities expelled Çeku from a conference held in the country due to Serbia's extradition request based on possible war crimes committed by him during the Kosovo War.

On 23 June 2009 he was arrested in Bulgaria under the Interpol arrest warrant issued by Serbia for alleged war crimes in Kosovo committed against the non-Albanian population. The Bulgarian authorities decided to release him from custody, but requested that he remain in the country for up to 40 days as officials consider Serbia's extradition request. On 30 June, he returned to Kosovo, after the Bulgarian prosecutors decided not to appeal the court's decision for his release.

In September 2020, he was summoned by the prosecutors at Hague as a war crimes suspect.

== Family life ==
He is married to Dragica, who is half-Serbian, half-Croatian. They have three children and the family divides its time between Pristina and the Croatian town of Zadar.

Political offices
Preceded by Bajram Kosumi	Prime Minister of Kosovo; 2006–2008	Succeeded by Hashim Thaçi
