= Commander of Kosovo Security Force =

- Komandanti i Forcës së Sigurisë së Kosovës (Albanian); Komandant Kosovskih Snaga Bezbednosti (Serbian)
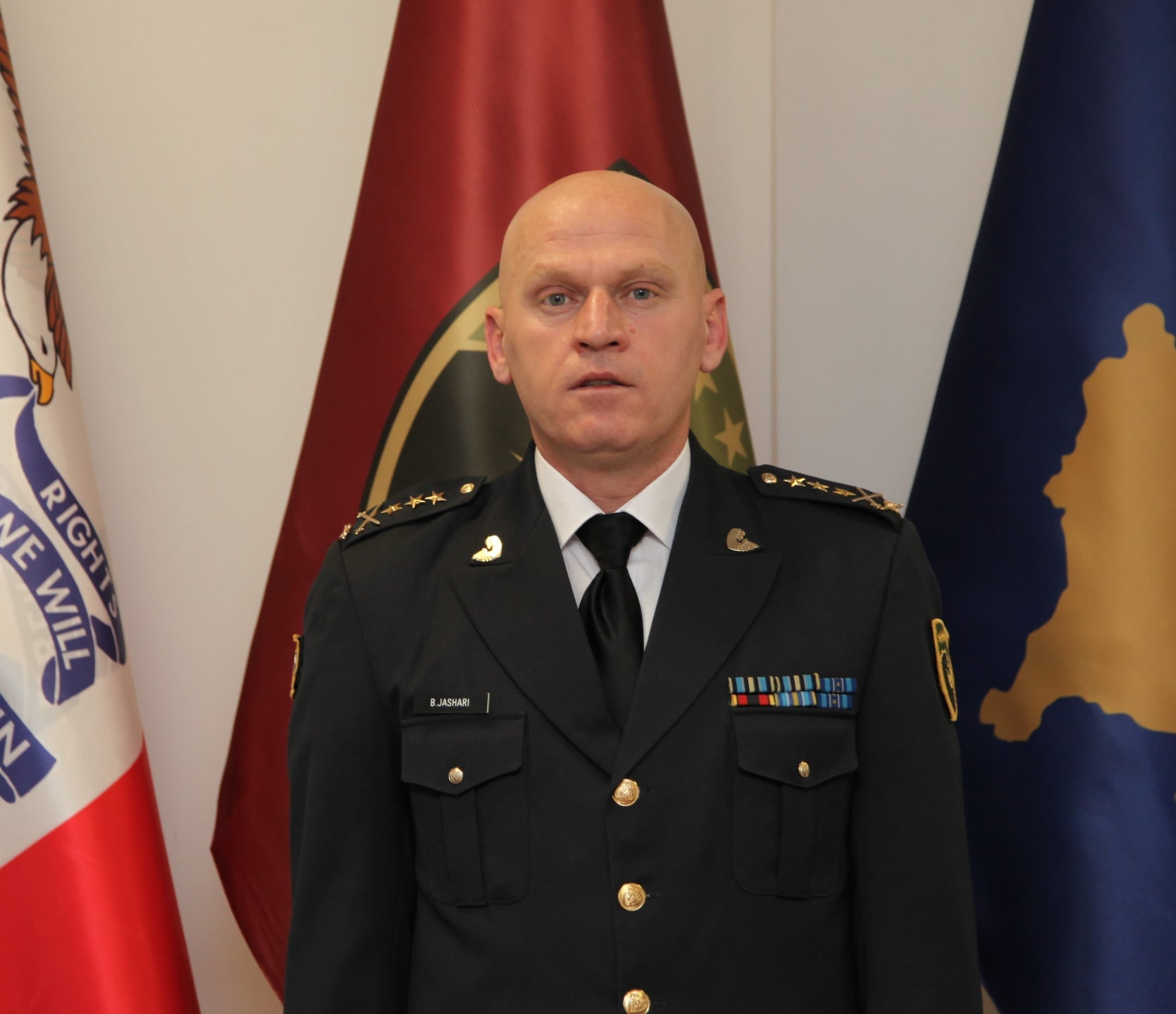
- Incumbent; Major general Bashkim Jashari since 30 November 2021
- Ministry of Defence
- Member of: Kosovo Security Force
- Reports to: Minister of Defence
- Appointer: President of Kosovo
- Formation: 16 June 2009
- First holder: Sylejman Selimi
- Website: Official website

The Commander of Kosovo Security Force (Albanian: Komandanti i Forcës së Sigurisë së Kosovës, Serbian: Начелник Штаба Одбране, romanized: Komandant Kosovskih Snaga Bezbednosti) is the highest-ranking military officer in the Kosovo Security Force, who is responsible for maintaining the operational command of the military.

== List of chiefs ==
| No. | Portrait | Commander of Kosovo Security Force | Took office | Left office | Time in office | Ref. |
|---|---|---|---|---|---|---|
| 1 | Sylejman Selimi | Lieutenant general Sylejman Selimi (born 1970) | 16 June 2009 | 22 November 2011 | 2 years, 159 days | |
| 2 | Kadri Kastrati [sq] | Lieutenant general Kadri Kastrati (born 1960) | 22 November 2011 | 18 March 2015 | 3 years, 116 days | |
| 3 | Rrahman Rama | Lieutenant general Rrahman Rama (born 1970) | 18 March 2015 | 30 November 2021 | 6 years, 257 days | |
| 4 | Bashkim Jashari | Lieutenant general Bashkim Jashari (born 1977) | 30 November 2021 | Incumbent | 4 years, 281 days | |
