= Military ranks of Kosovo =

The Military ranks of Kosovo are the military insignia used by the Kosovo Security Force. The current rank structure was introduced, to align with NATO standards.

== Current ranks ==
=== Commissioned officer ranks ===
The rank insignia of commissioned officers.

Rank group	General / flag officers			Senior officers			Junior officers
Kosovo Security Force
Kosovo Security Force	Gjenerallejtnant	Gjeneralmajor	Gjeneralbrigade	Kolonel	Nënkolonel	Major	Kapiten	Toger	Nëntoger
Equivalent NATO code	OF-8	OF-7	OF-6	OF-5	OF-4	OF-3	OF-2	OF-1

=== Other ranks ===
The rank insignia of non-commissioned officers and enlisted personnel.

Rank group	Senior NCOs						Junior NCOs			Enlisted
Kosovo Security Force
Kosovo Security Force	Rreshter major	Rreshter i parë	Rreshter master	Rreshter i klasit të parë	Rreshter i stafit	Rreshter	Tetar	Specialist	Ushtari o klasit te parë	Ushtar
Equivalent NATO code	OR-9	OR-8		OR-7	OR-6	OR-5	OR-4		OR-3	OR-2

==== Senior appointments ====
Rank group	Senior appointments
Kosovo Security Force
Kosovo Security Force	Rreshter major i FSK-së	Rreshter major i komandës
Equivalent NATO code	OR-9

== Historical ranks ==
=== Officers ===
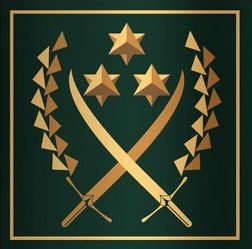
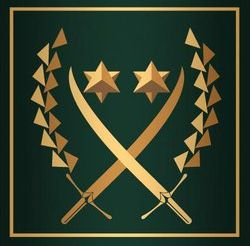
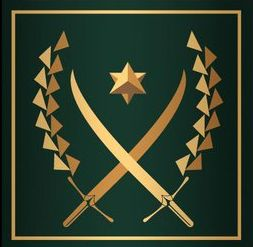
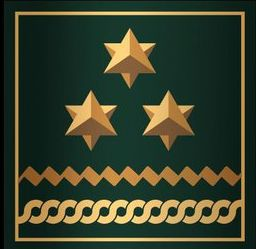
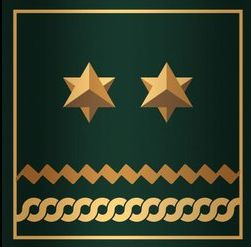
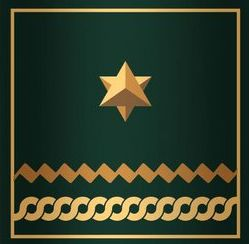
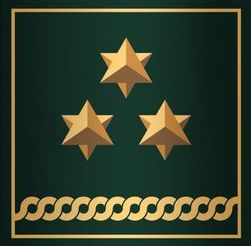
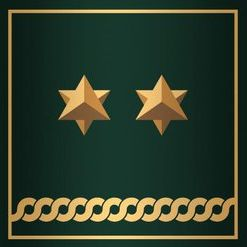
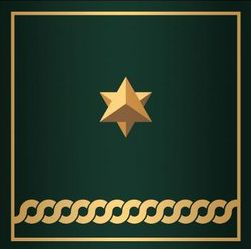
Rank group	General / flag officers			Senior officers			Junior officers
2009–2012
2009–2012	Gjenerallejtënant	Gjeneralmajor	Gjeneralbrigade	Kolonel	Nënkolonel	Major	Kapiten	Toger	Nëntoger
2012–2024
2012–2024	Gjenerallejtënant	Gjeneralmajor	Gjeneralbrigade	Kolonel	Nënkolonel	Major	Kapiten	Toger	Nëntoger

=== Other ranks ===
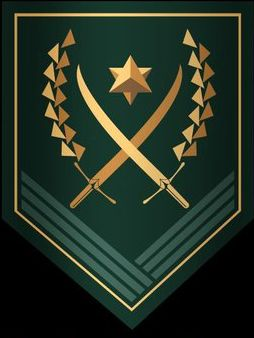
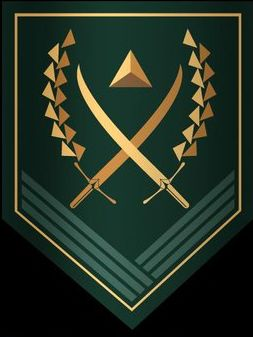
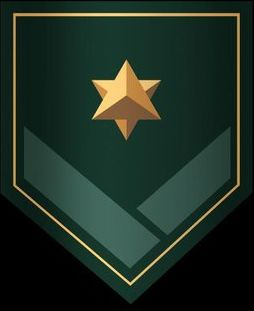
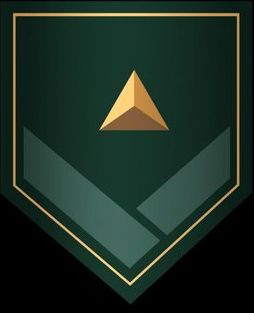
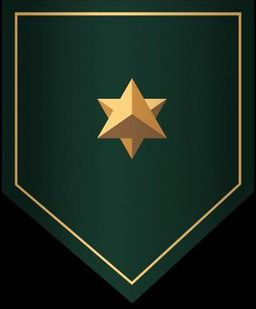
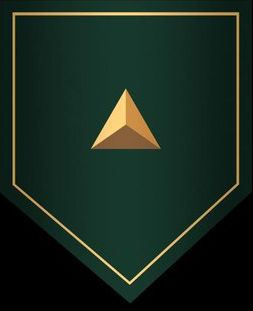
Rank group	Senior NCOs				Junior NCOs	Enlisted
2009–2012
2009–2012	Rreshter Major	Rreshter i parë	Kapter	Rreshter	Tetar	Ushtar
2012–2024
2012–2024	Rreshter major	Rreshter i parë	Kapter	Rreshter	Tetar	Ushtar
Equivalent NATO code	OR-8	OR-7	OR-6	OR-5	OR-4	OR-2
