= Armend Mehaj =

Kosovan politician

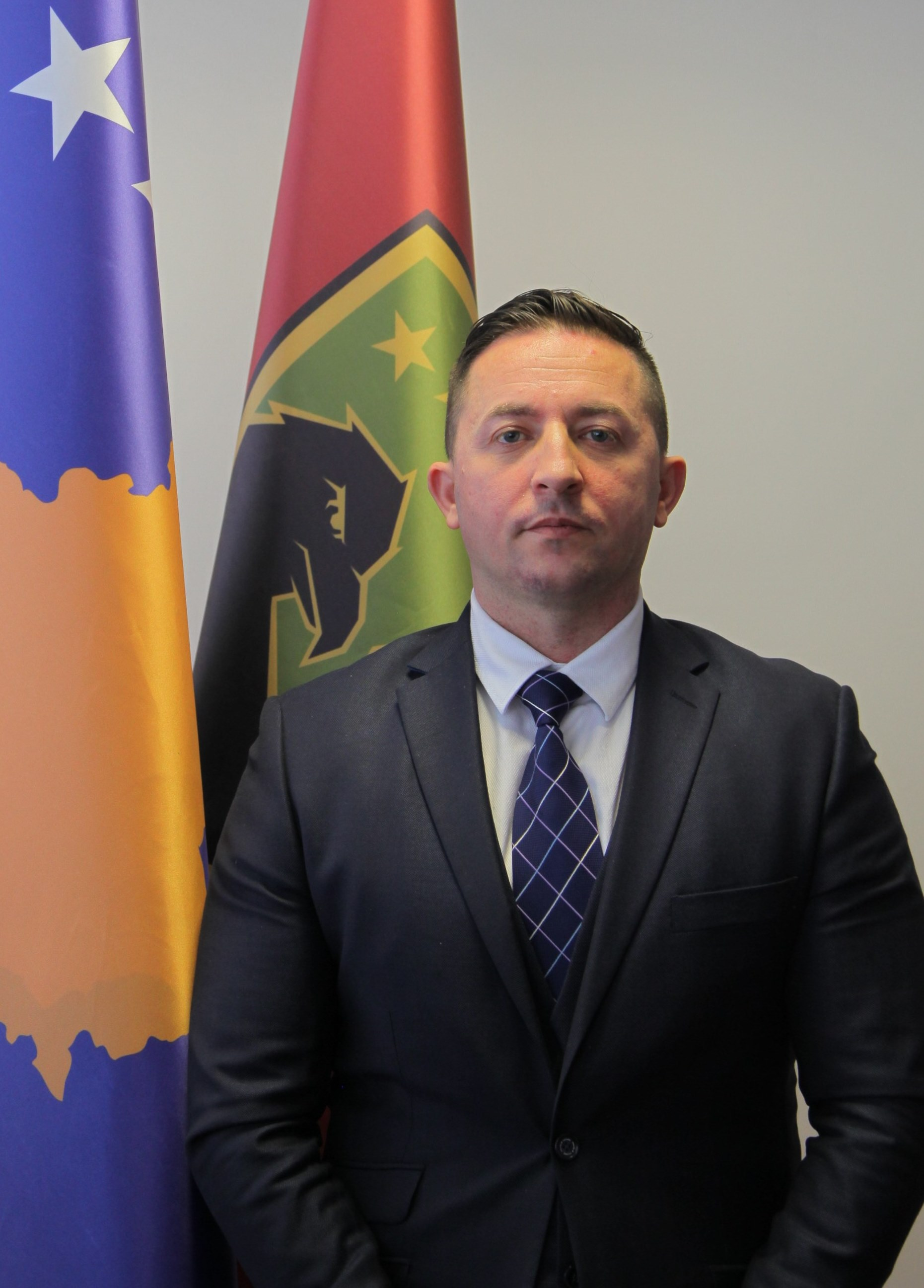
- Official portrait, 2021

Minister of Defense of Kosovo
- In office 22 March 2021 – 8 August 2023
- President: Glauk Konjufca (acting); Vjosa Osmani
- Prime Minister: Albin Kurti
- Preceded by: Anton Quni
- Succeeded by: Ejup Maqedonci

Personal details
- Born: 13 July 1981 (age 45) Isniq, Kosovo
- Party: Independent (before 2018)
- Children: 3
- Education: Bjørknes College
- Profession: Military officer
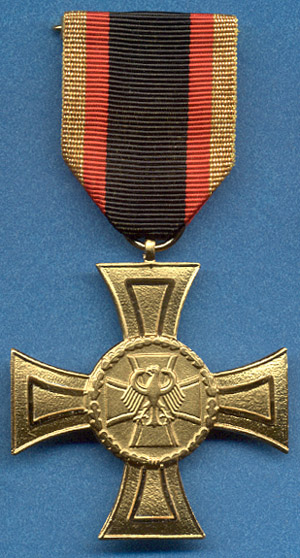
- Awards

Military service
- Allegiance: Norway
- Branch/service: Norwegian Armed Forces
- Years of service: 2000–2020

Armend Mehaj (born 13 July 1981) is a Kosovar–Norwegian military officer who served as the minister of defense of Kosovo from 22 March 2021 to 8 August 2023.

Born in the village of Isniq, in the town of Deçan, in the Republic of Kosovo. Mehaj emigrated to Norway as a child. He received his education at Bjørknes University College in Oslo. Educated at the Non-Commissioned Officers School and the War Academy. Master's in Leadership and Public Administration. During his career with the Norwegian military, he was stationed in Kosovo, Afghanistan, Iraq, Chad and central African rep, as part of the NATO peacekeeping force.
