= Ministry of Defence (Kosovo) =

Government ministry of Kosovo

- Ministria e Mbrojtjes
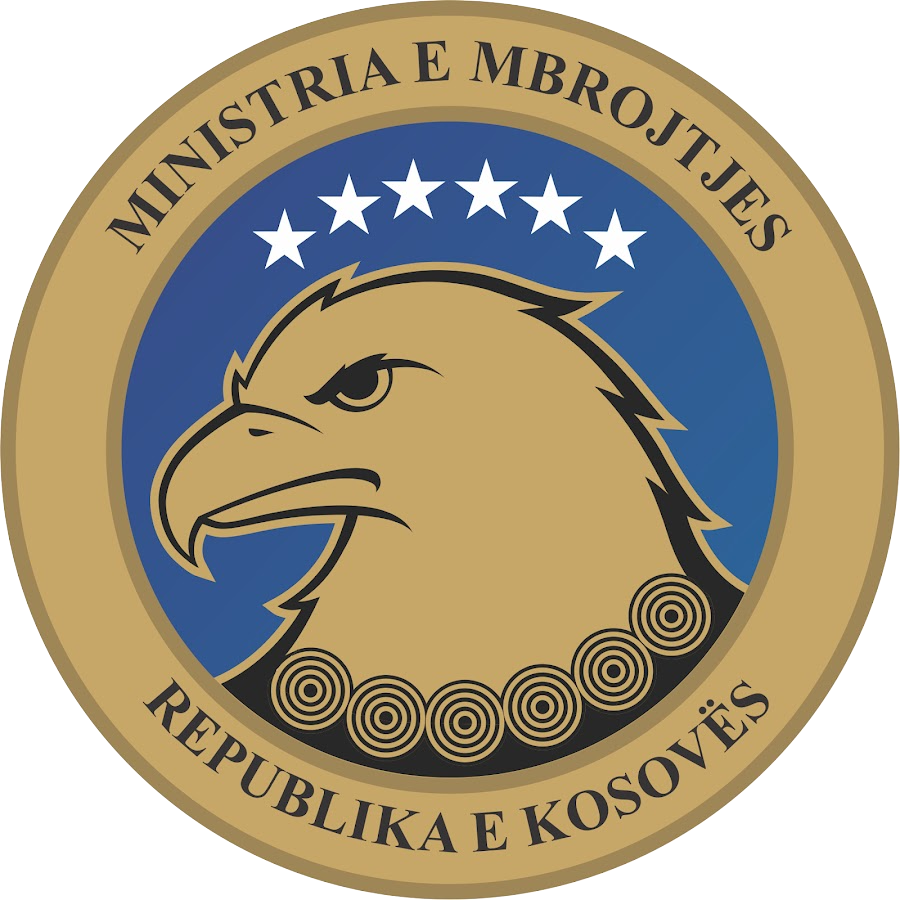
- Logo

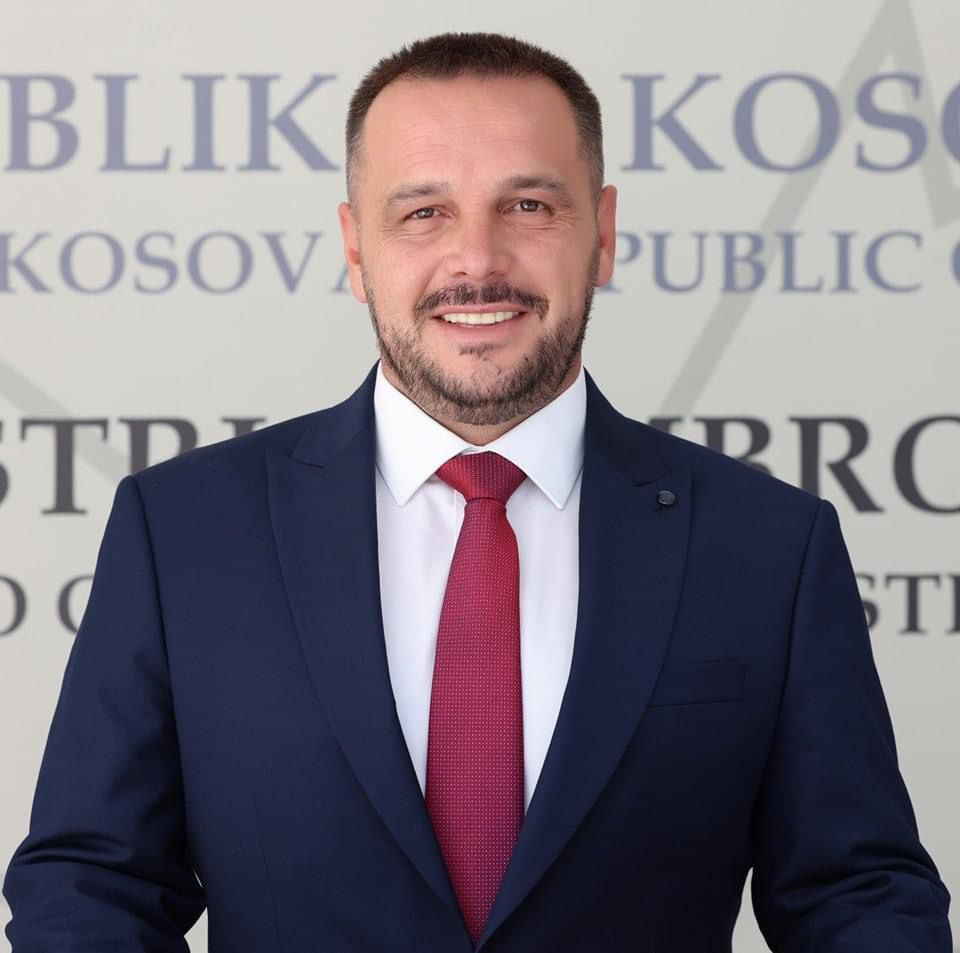
- Ejup Maqedonci

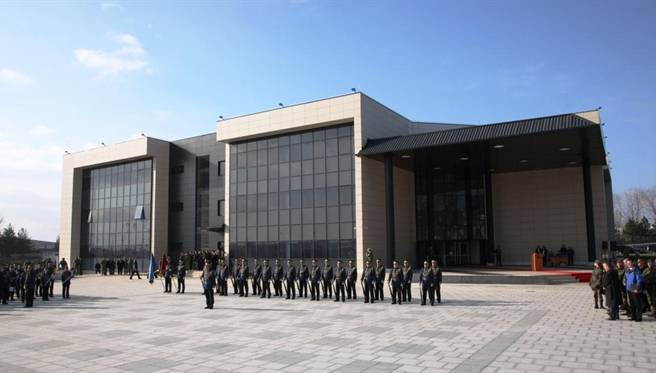
- Headquarters in Pristina

Ministry overview
- Jurisdiction: Government of Kosovo
- Headquarters: Kazerma Adem Jashari, 10000, Pristina, Kosovo; 42°39′18.4″N 21°8′21.4″E
- Minister responsible: Ejup Maqedonci
- Deputy Minister responsible: Adnan Rexheplar; Shemsi Syla
- Website: mod.rks-gov.net

The Ministry of Defence (Albanian: Ministria e Mbrojtjes) is a department of the government of Kosovo responsible for the defence policy and management of the Kosovo Security Force. The ministry has its headquarters in Pristina, with Ejup Maqedonci as the incumbent defence minister in the second cabinet of Albin Kurti.

== List of ministers ==
No.	Portrait	Name (born–died)	Term of office			Political party	Cabinet	Ref.
No.	Portrait	Name (born–died)	Took office	Left office	Time in office	Political party	Cabinet	Ref.
1		Fehmi Mujota	4 August 2008	22 February 2011	2 years, 202 days	PDK	Thaçi III	
2		Agim Çeku	22 February 2011	9 December 2014	3 years, 290 days	PSD	Thaçi III	
3		Haki Demolli	9 December 2014	9 September 2017	2 years, 274 days	LDK	Mustafa	
4		Rrustem Berisha	9 September 2017	3 February 2020	2 years, 147 days	AAK	Haradinaj II	
5		Anton Quni	3 February 2020	22 March 2021	1 year, 47 days	LDK	Kurti Hoti	
6		Armend Mehaj	22 March 2021	8 August 2023	2 years, 139 days	Independent	Kurti II	
7		Ejup Maqedonci	8 August 2023	Incumbent	3 years, 47 days	VV	Kurti II; Kurti III Kurti IV	

== See also ==
- Kosovo Security Force
