= Kosovo Centre for Public Safety Education and Development =

Training centre for Kosovo Police

The Kosovo Centre for Public Safety Education and Development (KCPSED), formerly the Kosovo Police Service School, is a training centre and education provider for the Kosovo Police, and for other public services in Kosovo. It is based in Vushtrri, 25 kilometers north of Pristina.

The Kosovo Police Service School (KPSS) was founded in September 1999, with help from the UN Police Mission in Kosovo, and run by the Organization for Security and Co-Operation in Europe (OSCE) - specifically, by the Department of Police Education and Development (DPED). The European Commission, particularly the EULEX mission, has also provided support for training. The school was founded as part of a broader OSCE initiative, in order to rebuild civil capabilities and rule of law after Serb armed forces were withdrawn at the end of the Kosovo War. By 2006 the KPS was able to take over responsibility for major policing operations.

== Police training ==
Training for police officers includes 20 weeks in the classroom and then 20 weeks of field training; at the end of the forty weeks, police officers are qualified and can work independently. Training emphasises the importance of human rights and fair policing in a democratic society. Additional courses were offered in specialist subjects including supervision and management, as well as recertification. A 4-week Criminal Investigation Course has been offered, for detectives, since 2001; and also a 4-week Traffic Accident Investigation Course.

Additionally, since August 2001, trainer certification has been provided, so that the Kosovo Police service has its own qualified trainers.

== Police recruits ==
Although OSCE trains police, the Kosovo Police Service is responsible for handling applications; applicants must be keen to work with people of different ethnicities, and committed to protecting human rights. Recruits include a reasonable proportion of women, Serbs, and other ethnic minorities.

Initial plans were for the KPSS to train 5700 police officers by December 2002. Between October 1999 and October 2004, 6953 police officers were trained at the KPSS.

== Transformation ==
In 2006, the Kosovo Police Service School was transformed into the Kosovo Center for Public Security, Education and Development, with a broader mandate to provide public-security education - including the customs service, border police, fire service, and prison service. It is now an executive agency of the Ministry of Internal Affairs. General Erhard Bühler, the commander of KFOR, visited KCPSED in March 2011.

The KCPSED has made good progress, but it will take time to meet Western standards of policing, which are somewhat higher than prevailing standards of policing in the region. The KPS has become one of Kosovo's most trusted public institutions.
