= Kosovo Security Force =

Military forces of the Republic of Kosovo

- Albanian: Forca e Sigurisë së Kosovës; Serbian: Косовске безбедносне снаге
- Emblem

- Flag
- Founded: 1 January 2009; 17 years ago
- Current form: 14 December 2018; 7 years ago (Note: In the process of moving from Kosovo Security Force to Kosovo Armed Forces.)
- Headquarters: Pristina, Kosovo
- Website: fsk-rks.org

Leadership
- President: Justina Shiroka Pula
- Minister of Defence: Ejup Maqedonci
- Commander: Lt. Gen. Bashkim Jashari

Personnel
- Military age: 18
- Conscription: No
- Active personnel: 5,000
- Reserve personnel: 3,000
- Deployed personnel: Operation Interflex; International Stabilization Force; Formerly: Kuwait; Falkland Islands

Expenditure
- Budget: €224,168,000 (2027)
- Percent of GDP: 1.60% (2027)

Industry
- Foreign suppliers: Austria; Albania; Belgium; Croatia; Germany; Italy; Israel; Sweden; Turkey; United Kingdom; United States

Related articles
- History: Kosovo Liberation Army; Kosovo Protection Corps
- Ranks: Military ranks of Kosovo

The Kosovo Security Force (KSF) (Note: Albanian: Forca e Sigurisë së Kosovës, FSK; Serbian: Косовске безбедносне снаге, romanized: Kosovske bezbednosne snage) is the military of Kosovo. The KSF is tasked with defending the sovereignty and territorial integrity of Kosovo, military support for civilian authorities, and participation in international peacekeeping missions and operations. Since 2018, it is in the process of transforming into the Kosovo Armed Forces.

The President of Kosovo is the Supreme Commander of the Kosovo Security Force and has the competence to mobilise the Kosovo Security Force in cases of a state of emergency. In peacetime, the President's powers as Commander-in-Chief are executed through the Prime Minister and the Defence Minister.

== History ==
=== Kosovo Protection Corps ===
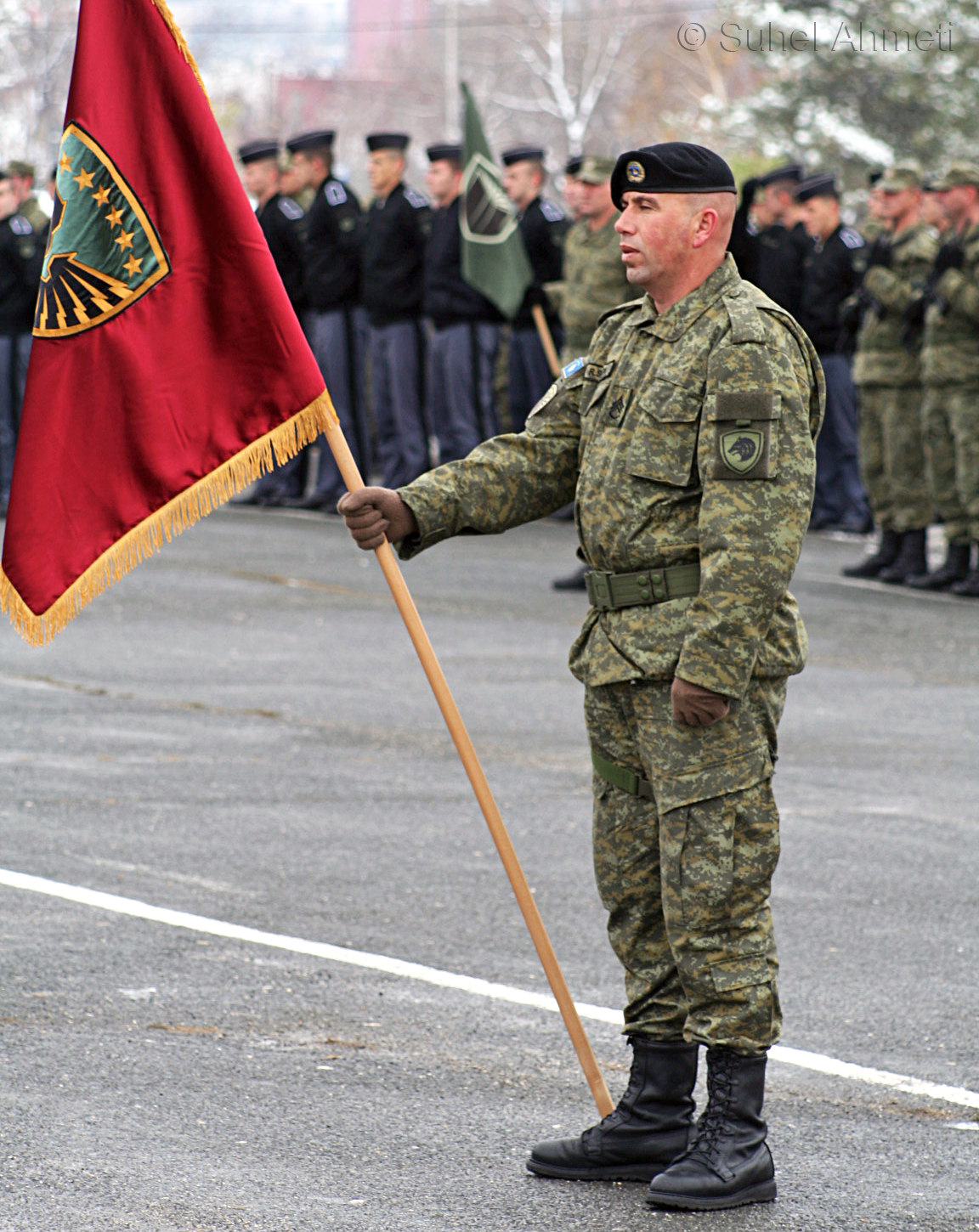
Kosovo Security Force's standard-bearer

Following the Kosovo War in 1999, the United Nations Security Council Resolution 1244 placed Kosovo under the authority of the United Nations Interim Administration Mission in Kosovo (UNMIK), with security provided by the NATO-led Kosovo Force (KFOR). KFOR entered Kosovo on 12 June 1999 under a United Nations mandate, two days after the adoption of UN Security Council Resolution 1244.

After KFOR entered Kosovo, the Kosovo Liberation Army was disbanded and some of its members joined the newly-formed Kosovo Protection Corps (KPC). According to UNMIK regulation 1999/8, the KPC's tasks were to provide disaster response, conduct search and rescue operations, provide humanitarian assistance, assist in demining, and contribute to the rebuilding of infrastructure after the war. KPC's membership grew over time, but it never had any role in defence, law enforcement, riot control, internal security, or any other law and order tasks.

=== Establishment of the KSF and its early operations ===
Kosovo declared its independence from Serbia in February 2008. On 19 March 2008, United States President George W. Bush authorised the delivery of military aid to Kosovo, as another step into establishing formal relations with Kosovo. In March 2008, the NATO-led KFOR and the KPC started preparations for the formation of the Kosovo Security Force. According to guidelines laid out in the Ahtisaari Plan, the Kosovo Security Force was initially permitted to carry light weapons. The admission and the training of personnel began in early June 2008, when NATO experts arrived in Kosovo to guide the process, and from early December 2008, the enlisting of candidates between 18 and 30 years old began.

On 20 January 2009, the names of those who were to be selected for the KSF from the KPC were announced. After being vetted by NATO, roughly 1,400 former members of the KPC were selected to serve as officers and rank-and-file members of the KSF. On 21 January 2009, the Kosovo Security Force was officially launched. The KSF was not a continuation of the KPC, which was disbanded several months later. KFOR was charged with mentoring the KSF and bringing the force to full operational capability. As part of this effort, various nations that were part of KFOR have assisted the force on a bilateral basis, with the United States supplying the force with uniforms and Germany donating some utility vehicles and trucks. Mentoring efforts were meant to develop the KSF in line with NATO standards. Additionally, Italy, Portugal, and other NATO members helped the KSF with donations and training. Slovenia donated €30,000 towards the establishment of the KSF.

The first KSF Commander was Lieutenant-General Sylejman Selimi. Other officers who took their oath were Lieutenant-General Bashkim Jashari, Brigadier-General Xhevahir Geci, Brigadier-General Zymer Halimi, Brigadier-General Imri Ilzai, and Brigadier-General Enver Cikaqi.

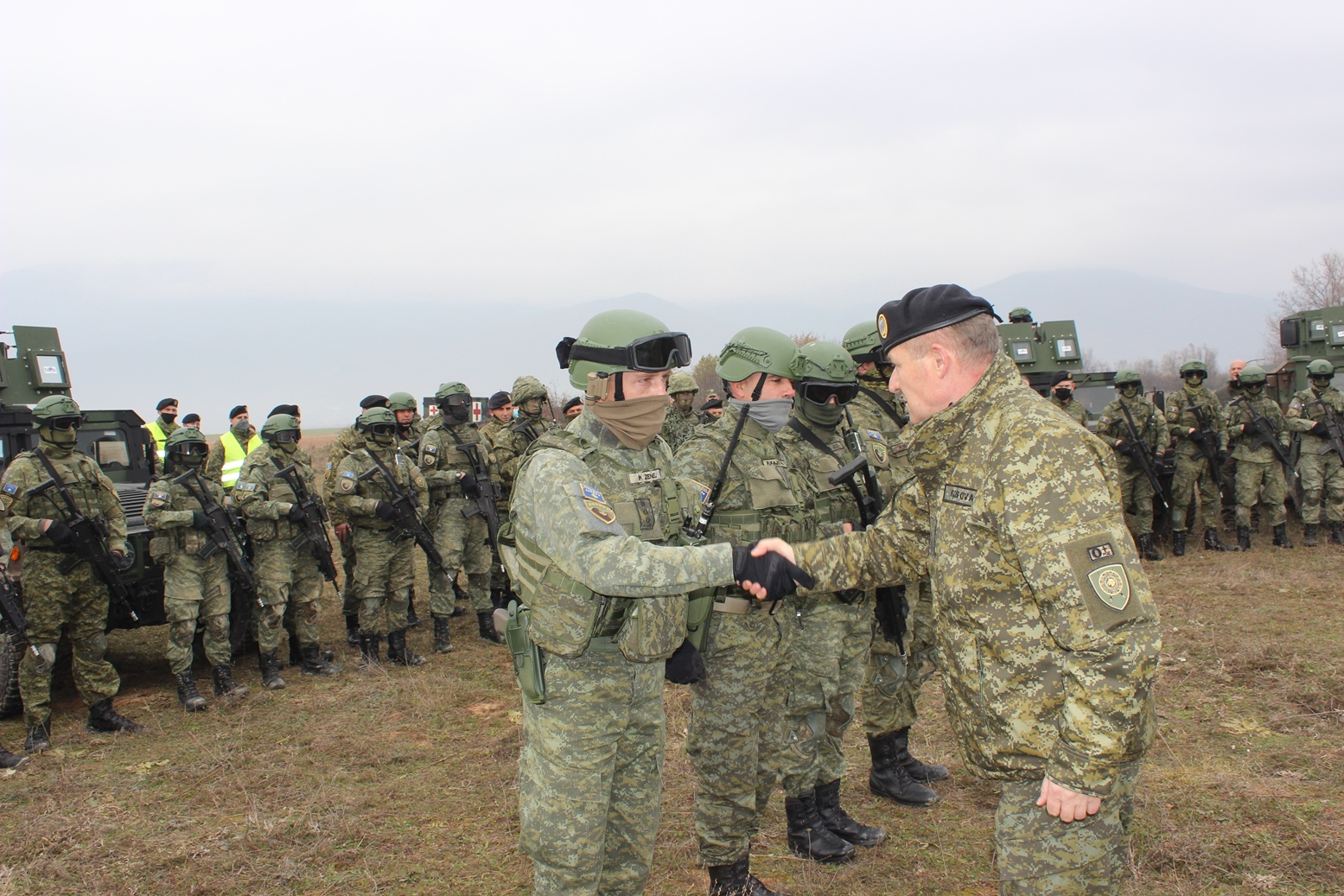
Members of the Kosovo Security Force during an exercise near Istog.

On 15 September 2009 the Kosovo Security Force officially began to work, having gained its initial operational capacities after an eight-month training with NATO instructors.

On 22 November 2011, Lieutenant General Sylejman Selimi retired from the KSF and President Atifete Jahjaga appointed the former Director of Operations Major General Kadri Kastrati to succeed him as Commander of the force. President Jahjaga also promoted Kastrati to the rank of lieutenant general.

On 9 July 2013, the North Atlantic Council determined that the KSF had reached full operational capability concerning non-military security operations that were not appropriate for the police. This included search and rescue operations, explosive ordnance disposal, control and clearance of hazardous materials, firefighting, and other humanitarian assistance tasks.

NATO's role in the creation of KSF has therefore been two-fold: helping with its formation – standing up, recruitment and training; and the establishment of a civilian-led organisation to supervise and control the KSF. One of the principal aims was to encourage all minorities to enroll, so special attention was given to carrying out the recruitment process in two languages – Albanian and Serbian. The result has been a professional, multi-ethnic, all-volunteer force, which continued to remain a source of regional stability. Following the declaration of full operational capability, NATO continued to support the development of the KSF through the NATO Liaison and Advisory Team (NLAT), consisting of a mix of approximately 30 military and civilian personnel that help with the professional development of the KSF, providing advice and support in a variety of areas such as capacity-building, training and leadership.

=== Towards the Kosovo Armed Forces ===
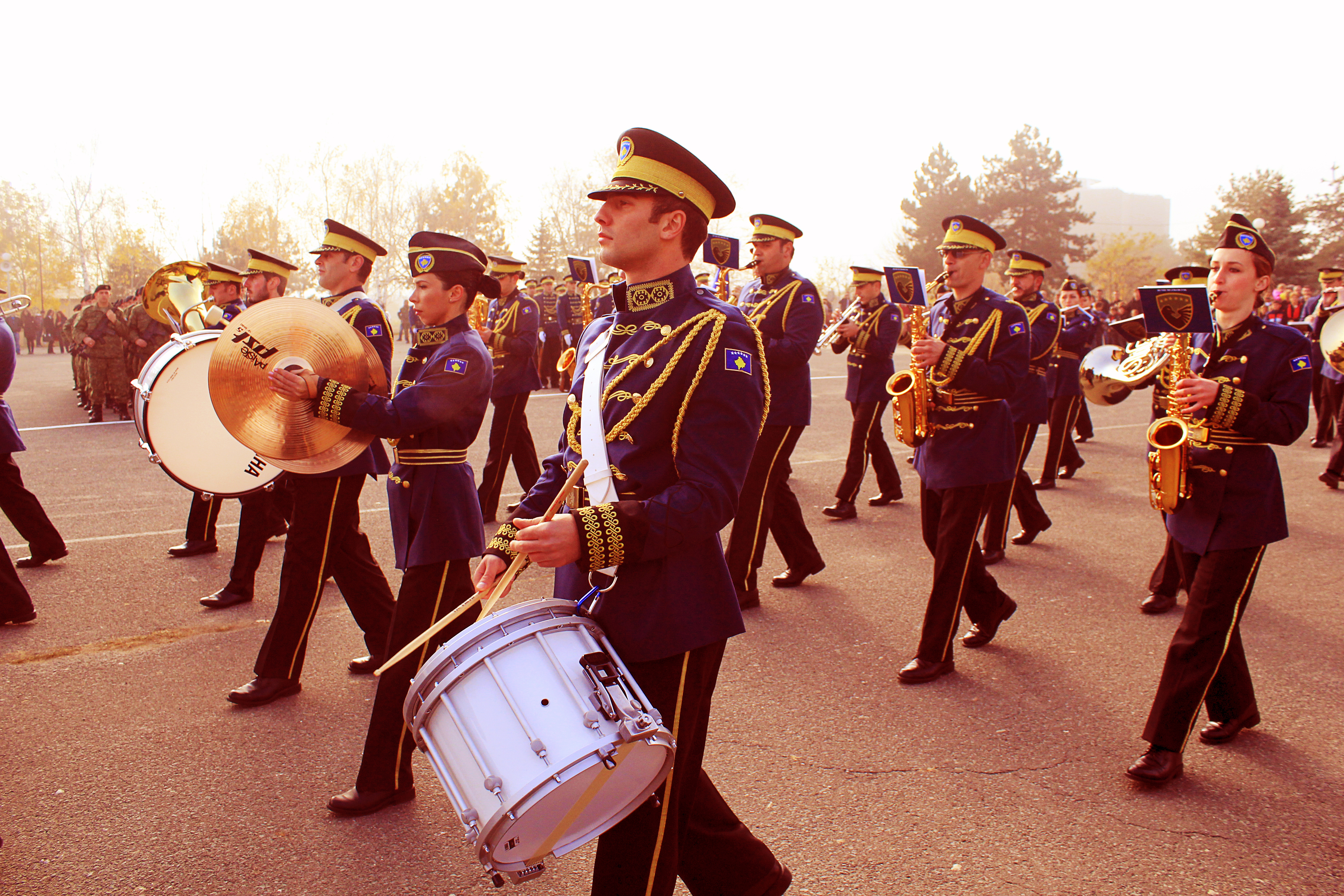
The Kosovo Security Force Band

On 5 March 2014, Prime Minister Hashim Thaçi declared that the Government of Kosovo had decided to establish a Defence Ministry and by 2019, officially transform the KSF into the Kosovo Armed Forces (Albanian: Forcat e Armatosura të Kosovës, FAK), which was supposed to meet all NATO standards, aiming to join the alliance in the future. The new army was planned to have 5,000 active members and 3,000 reservists and be composed of the land forces, a national guard, as well as logistics and training commands.

Kosovo's Minister of KSF Agim Çeku stated that the Kosovo Armed Forces' mission was "to protect the sovereignty and territorial integrity of Kosovo, its people and their property and protect the interests of the Republic of Kosovo". Kosovo's ambassador to Turkey, Avni Spahiu, stated that the "decision to establish an army had been taken in consultation with NATO and [Kosovo's] partners... [and] the army would have a defensive character, since Kosovo had no territorial aspirations [towards its neighbours]".

On 28 May 2014, President Atifete Jahjaga told the United Nations Security Council that the creation of the Kosovo Armed Forces would be a long process, requiring the support and participation of all ethnic communities in Kosovo; she added that its purpose would be to contribute to overall security in the Balkans and called on all ethnic communities to take part in the process. In November 2014, Agim Çeku stated that the Kosovo Army was running behind schedule "because of the delay in the constitution of the Kosovo parliament" but the decision to transform the Kosovo Security Force into an Army would be confirmed "at one of the first sessions upon its constitution"; he also noted that this transformation enjoyed nationwide support and he didn't expect any complaints from the political opposition.

=== Passing of the new KSF law ===
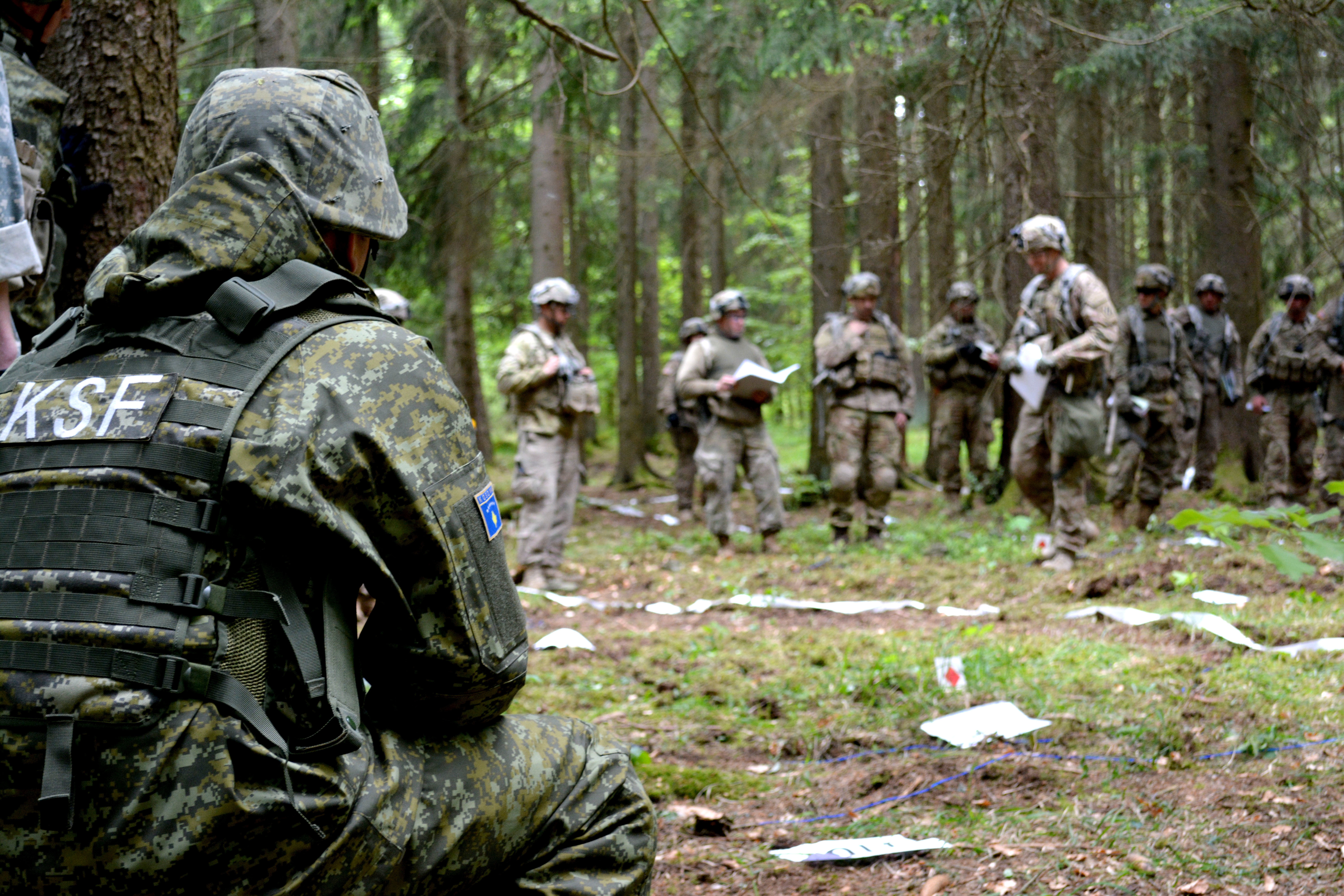
A Kosovo Security Force Soldier watches troop commanders from 5th Squadron, 7th Cavalry Regiment walk through a combined arms rehearsal as part of Combined Resolve VI at Hohenfels, Germany.

On 18 October 2018, the Kosovo Assembly passed the first draft of a law to transform the Kosovo Security Force into the Kosovo Armed Forces within 10 years. 98 of its 120 deputies voted in favor, and the remaining 22 remained absent from the vote, including 11 representatives from the Serb minority who boycotted the vote.

On 14 December 2018, the Assembly of Kosovo passed the final legislation to redefine the KSF as a "professional military force" and to establish Kosovo's Ministry of Defence. The law predicts a transformation process that consists of three stages and will finish in 2028.

After the beginning of the Russian invasion of Ukraine, the Assembly of Kosovo passed a resolution, urging the government to start a NATO membership bid.

The Kosovo Security Force has enjoyed a significant increase in investment in recruiting, training, and equipment since the 2018 legislation change. Its budget increased significantly from €50 million in 2018, to €123 million in 2023, with the latter reaching €203 million (2% of GDP) after additional government transfers during the year. The approved KSF budget for 2024 is €138 million.

In September 2025, Prime Minister Albin Kurti announced a planned budget of over €1 Billion to be allocated to the Kosovo Security Force. Kurti stated "For our army, in four years of the next mandate, we will allocate a budget of over one billion euros. We will deepen and expand international bilateral and multilateral cooperation with NATO member countries. The ammunition factory will be made operational, and Kosovo’s military industry will be developed. We will also develop military drones Made in Kosovo... We will create a joint military unit with the Armed Forces of the Republic of Albania. Recruitment of new cadets will continue at an accelerated pace. Our goal is to have 1,000 women in the army within the next mandate. A comprehensive protection programme will be implemented throughout the country. Under this programme, every voluntary reservist will receive adequate training and weaponry in case of mobilisation".

=== Reactions to the legislative changes ===
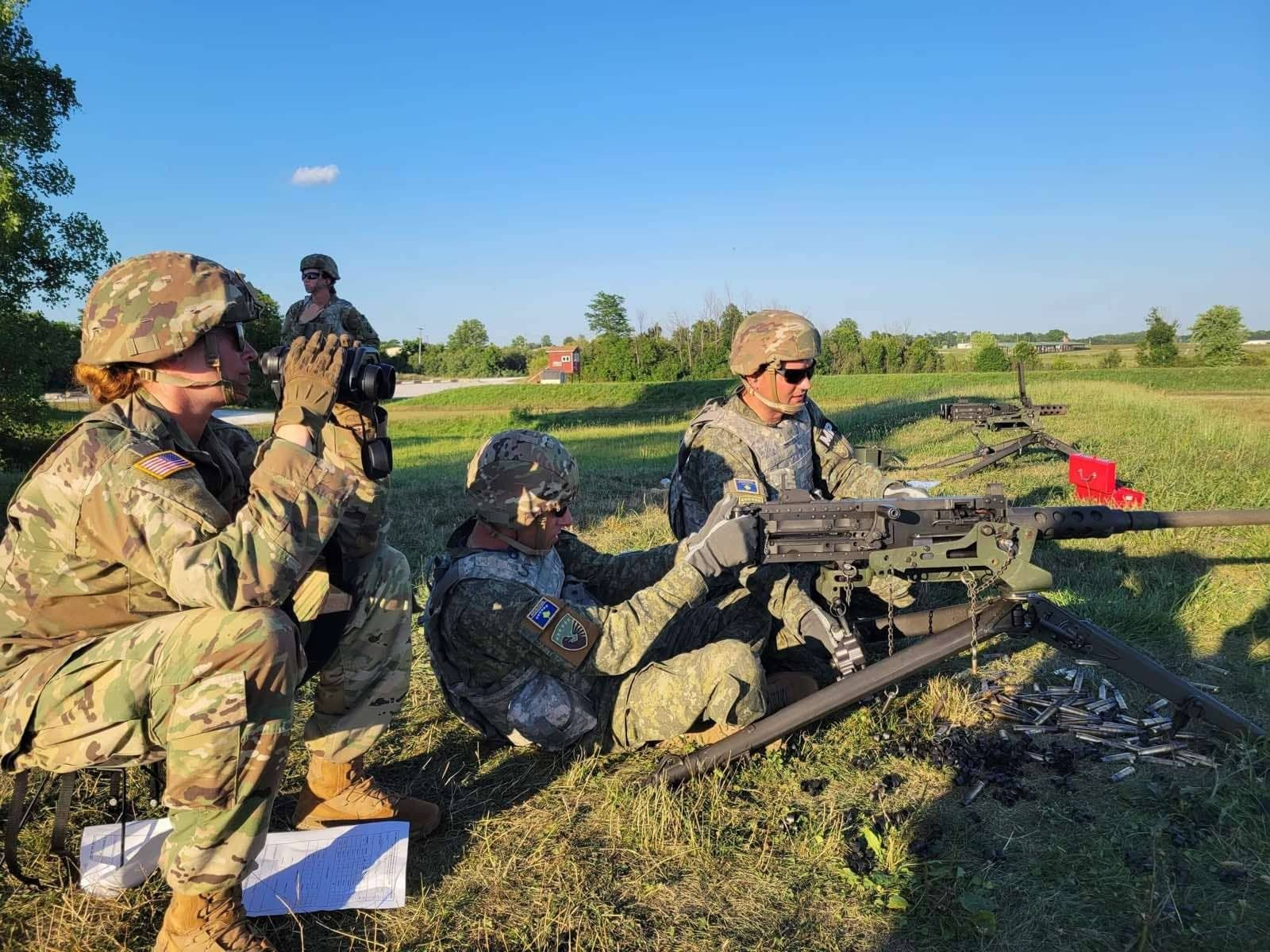
KSF soldiers exercising under the supervision of an instructor from the Iowa National Guard.

Reactions to the transformation of KSF to KAF have been mixed. The move has been seen with skepticism by Serbia and by NATO, European Union and United Nations officials, but it has been endorsed by the United States, as well as the governments of Germany, United Kingdom and France.

The Serbian authorities have repeatedly said that according to all international documents, and especially UN Resolution 1244, NATO-led KFOR is the only legal military formation in Kosovo alongside 999 Serbian military personnel guaranteed by Resolution 1244. Jens Stoltenberg, Secretary General of NATO, said he regrets that the Kosovo Assembly has decided to transform KSF despite concerns from the alliance, adding that "this move comes at the wrong time". Also, Federica Mogherini, High Representative of the European Union for Foreign Affairs has expressed regret over Kosovo's move to form a new army. Furthermore, António Guterres, UN Secretary-General, expressed deep concern over the decision of Kosovo authorities, urging "all parties concerned" to exercise restraint.

On the other hand, the United States fully supported and endorsed the move. In a statement, the US Embassy in Kosovo stated that Kosovo is a sovereign nation, and as such, it is allowed to have a force to defend its territory. They confirmed that the United States would continue to support the development of KAF, and that they expected the cooperation of the KAF and NATO to continue. The US. Ambassador in Kosovo, Philip S. Kosnett called the transformation a historical move.

== Training and international cooperation ==
The KSF trains its officers at its Centre for University Studies – Kosovo's Defence Academy. The centre includes a four-year academic program and its graduates get the rank of second lieutenant (Albanian: nën-toger). Another institution that works under the umbrella of the KSF is the International Centre for Search and Rescue Training, which provides training to both KSF and foreign militaries in search-and-rescue operations and demining. Among others, in 2022 and 2023 training has been provided to Ukrainian and Dutch companies of soldiers.

=== International cooperation ===
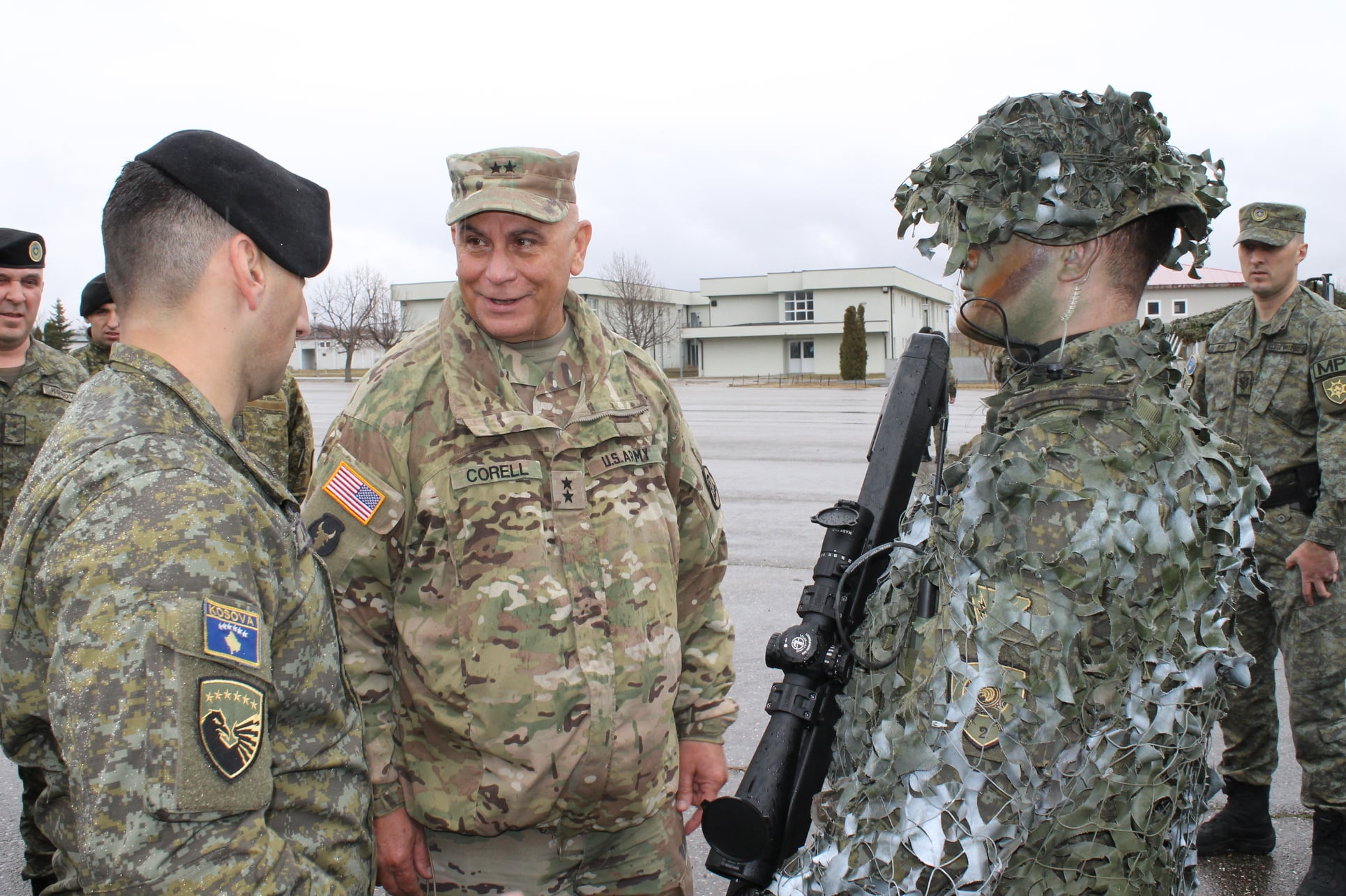
Maj. General Benjamin Corell of the Iowa National Guard inspecting a Kosovo Security Force soldier's equipment.

The KSF enjoys close cooperation with KFOR, as well as armies of partner countries. The Iowa National Guard is one of Kosovo Security Force's main partners and supporters in its transformation into the Kosovo Armed Forces. It assists the KSF in improving its capacity and capabilities, as well as disaster response and emergency management. KSF also competes with the Iowa National Guard in the ISEAGE cybersecurity competition held at Iowa State University. Other partners include the Turkish Army, which trains KSF members in the use of Turkish military equipment and aviation; the Albanian Army, with which KSF regularly participates in joint unit-level exercises and indirect fire exercises; and the British Army, which conducts annual joint exercises with the KSF, such as the Cambrian Patrol.

The KSF's personnel trains in NATO military academies in Turkey, the US, and the UK, including the Turkish School of Army Aviation in Isparta, the US Military Academy West Point, British Military Academy Sandhurst, US Air Force Academy, US Naval Academy, Albanian Military Academy, Croatian Defence Academy, German Defence Academy, Canadian Royal Forces Academy, and Macedonian Military Academy.

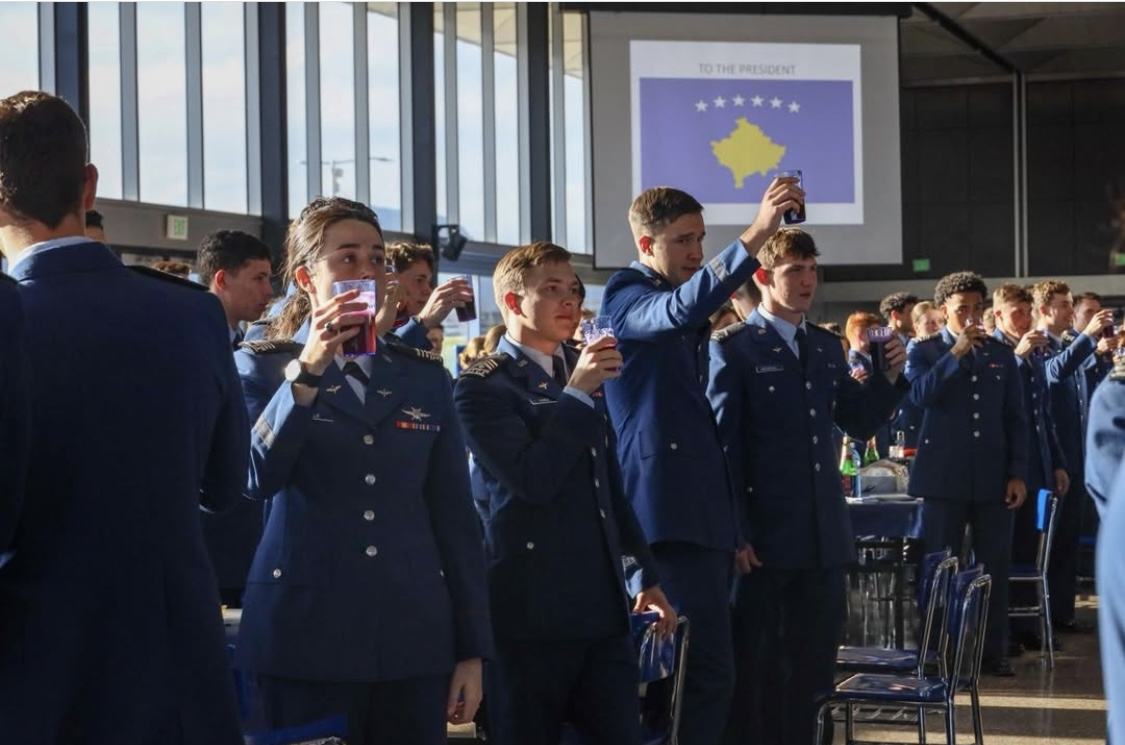
US Air Force Academy Cadets raising a toast to the president of Kosovo in their Promotion and Recognition Dinner.

The United States has trained Kosovo soldiers in different courses including Airborne, Air Assault Course, Airmenship, Rifle Expert, Mountain, Sapper (First international officer to graduate is from Kosovo) and Ranger School (First International Women to graduate is an officer from Kosovo).

KSF members have had success completing all these courses.

Many officers and NCO’s have been awarded the German Armed Forces Badge for Military Proficiency for their physical and leadership merits.

=== Missions abroad ===
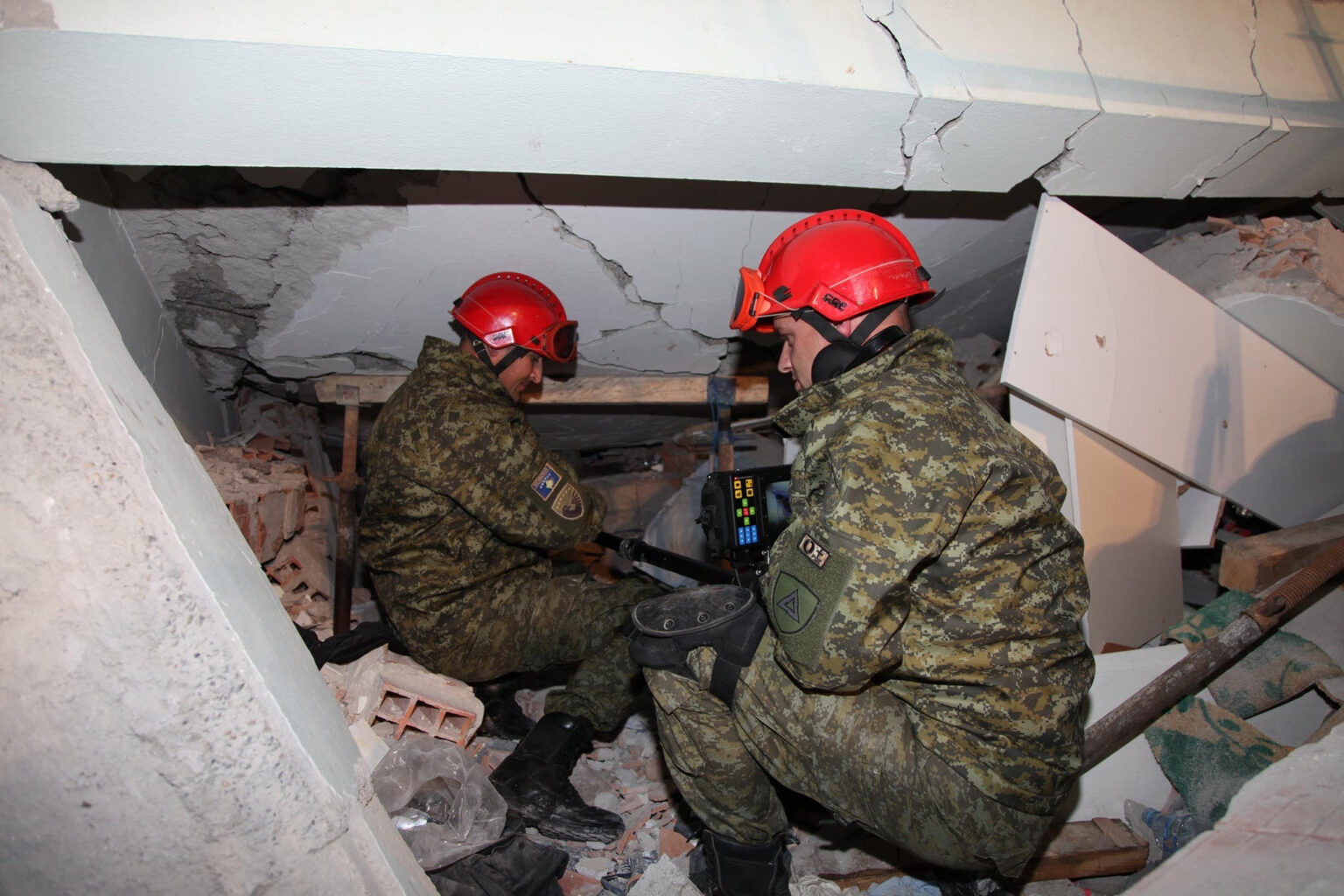
Kosovo Security Force rescuers searching for survivors after the 2019 Albania earthquake.

The KSF has conducted several missions abroad. Its first deployment abroad took place in 2010 to assist the Albanian authorities in the 2009–10 Albanian floods. Deployments to Albania for firefighting and search-and-rescue missions have become a common occurrence and in 2019, the KSF supported the Albanian authorities after the 2019 Albania earthquake.

KSF's first military operation abroad took place in March 2021, when a contingent of KSF troops was deployed in a peacekeeping mission in Kuwait, serving under US command. It was followed by another mission, under British command, in the Falkland Islands.

The deployment of the KSF in operations abroad has been formalised by the passing of a new law in 2022, which regulates the procedures that allow the KSF to be deployed in international humanitarian operations, peacekeeping missions, as well as training and exercises with international partners.

In early 2024, a contingent of 26 KSF instructors traveled to the UK to participate in Operation Interflex, which provides training and support to the Armed Forces of Ukraine.

During the Board of Peace summit on 19 February 2026, among other countries (Albania, Indonesia, Kazakhstan and Morocco), Kosovo also pledged to send troops for an International Stabilization Force in Gaza Strip, which is planned to consist of a total of 20,000 soldiers.

=== Defender Europe ===
The KSF has participated in two large US-led military exercises in Europe: Defender-Europe 21 and Defender-Europe 23. In both cases, the KSF participated in the exercises, and Kosovo additionally served as one of the hosts. The KSF took advantage of the exercises to validate its command and infantry regiments.

== Mission statement ==
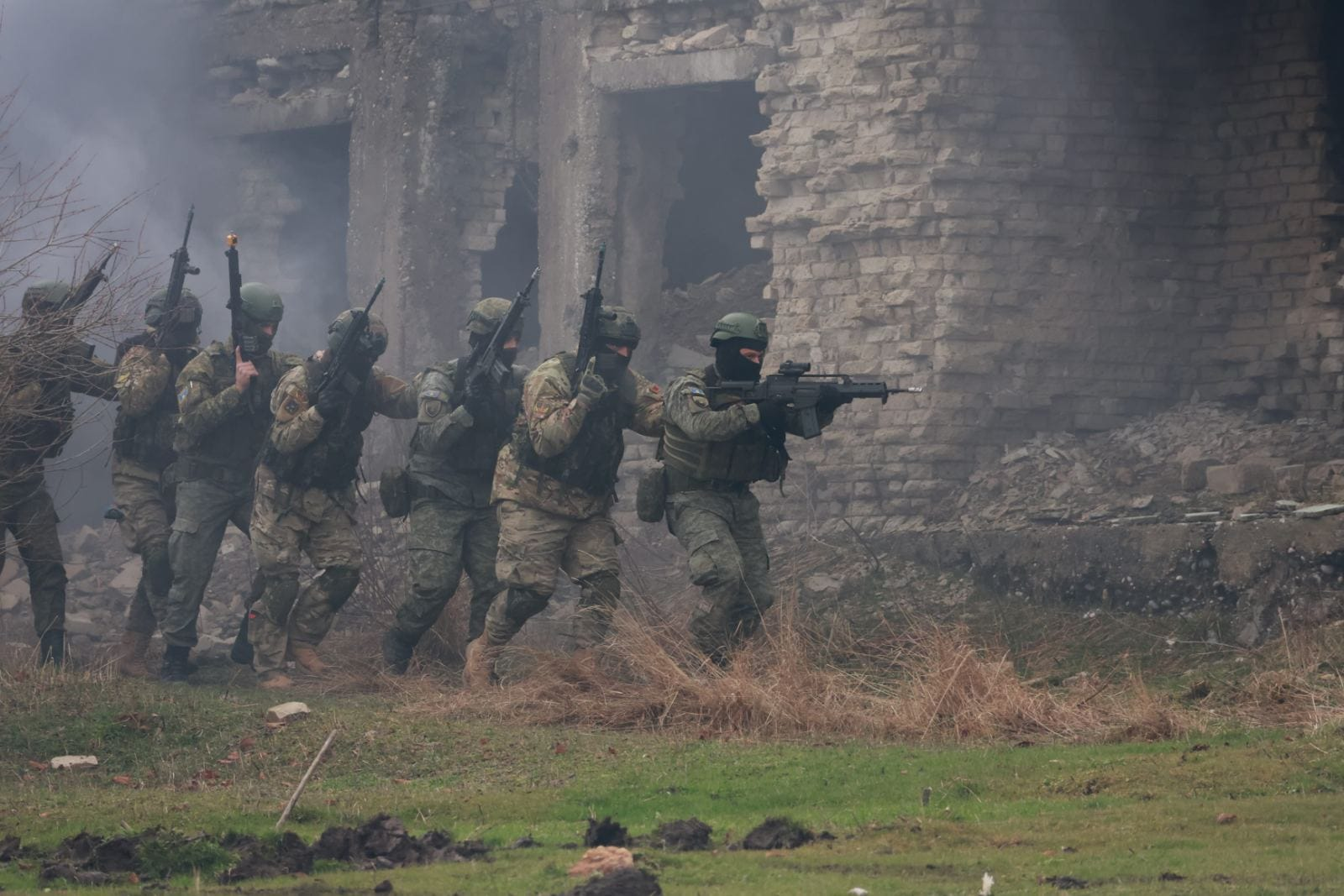
Members of the KSF and the Albanian Army conducting a joint exercise.

Kosovo Security Force's duties are to defend the sovereignty and territorial integrity of the Republic of Kosovo, provide military support to civilian authorities, and to participate in international military operations.

The Ministry of Defence of Kosovo (MoD) is responsible for exercising civilian control over the Force, including management and administration. It comprises a mixture of civilian and KSF personnel and is accountable, through the Prime Minister, to the Kosovo Assembly.

The mission of the MoD, is to formulate, implement, evaluate and develop the policies and activities of the KSF within a framework of democratic governance and in accordance with the Constitution and laws of the Republic of Kosovo.

== Personnel ==
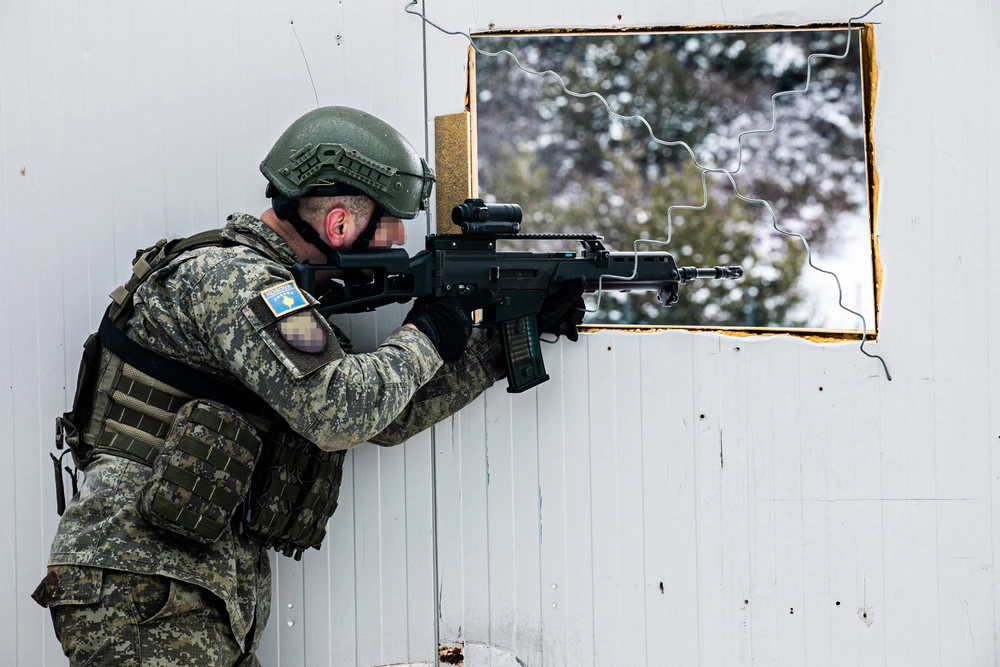
Member of the KSF during an annual exercise

Any citizen of Kosovo over the age of 18 is eligible to serve in the Kosovo Security Force. Active members of the Kosovo Security Force are not legally allowed to run for, or serve in the Assembly of Kosovo. The membership of the Kosovo Security Force is required to reflect the ethnic composition of the country. Members of the Security Force are protected from discrimination on the basis of gender or ethnicity.

The Ministry of Defence has taken active steps to recruit women into the Security Force. As of 2015, women made up 8.52% of the uniformed service members of the Security Force and 32% of the Ministry as a whole. Of the 203 women in uniform in the Security Force, 21 are officers; the highest ranking woman in the Security Force is a Major-general Irfete Spahiu.

According to the Law on the Kosovo Security Force, KSF can have up to 5,000 active soldiers and up to 3,000 reservists, but it allows the Force to recruit above that number based on strategic defence reviews. As of 2023, KSF has surpassed the 5,000 active members threshold and is steadily recruiting over 1,000 new members per year.

=== Ethnic minorities ===
Minorities in the KSF (2017)
Ethnicity	Number
Turks	49
Serbs	45
Bosniaks	43
Ashkali	30
Egyptians	14
Croats	3
Romani	3
Gorani	1
Germans	1

Ethnic minorities of Kosovo are encouraged to enroll in the Kosovo Security Force with Kosovo's constitution requiring the integration of ethnic-minority communities into the Kosovo Security Force. In April 2013, 179 (8.2%) of the Kosovo Security Force's military personnel came from minority backgrounds, the remainder being ethnic Albanians. In May 2014, Kosovar President Atifete Jahjaga noted to the United Nations Security Council that 9% of the KSF were from minority communities. In July 2018 40 out of 137 Serbs tendered their resignations from the KSF. Minister of the KSF, Rustem Berisha stated that the personnel in question were pressured by Serbia and had received "blackmail and threats" violating their basic human rights.

== Structure ==
The KSF is commanded by the Commander of Kosovo Security Force, who oversees the work of the General Staff of the army. The General Staff of the KSF comprises the Land Force Command, the National Guard Command, the Logistics Command, and the Training and Doctrine Command.

=== Land Force Command ===
The Land Force Command of the KSF is the part of the KSF that is responsible for KSF's military operations within Kosovo and abroad. It is made up of three infantry regiments, which are based in Gjilan, Istog, and Mitrovica. The First Regiment, based in Gjilan, has had all of its military capabilities validated during the Defender Europe 23 exercise. The Second Regiment in Istog validated some of its companies during Defender Europe 23 and will finish its validation in 2024. The Third Regiment will get its validation in 2025 during the Defender Europe 25 exercise, thus closing the Second Phase of the transition of the KSF into the Kosovo Armed Forces. The KSF's special operations unit is also commanded by the Land Force Command.

=== National Guard Command ===
The National Guard Command of the KSF was established in 2019 and its main responsibility is to provide military support to civilian authorities. It additionally supports the Land Force Command in territorial defence and overseas operations.

=== Logistics Command ===
The Logistics Command of the KSF is responsible for providing logistical, as well as medical support to the other units of the KSF. It is based in Pristina in the Adem Jashari garrison.

=== Training and Doctrine Command ===
The Training and Doctrine Command is responsible for recruiting and training KSF's new cadets. The Centre for University Studies – Kosovo's Defence Academy and the International Centre for Search and Rescue Training are also managed by this Command.

=== Aviation ===
The Kosovo Security Force is building its air defence capabilities. It currently possesses a series of UAVs and UCAVs and is in the process of purchasing air-defence capabilities and aircraft. In January 2025, it was announced that Kosovo's minister of defence had reached an agreement with US State Department officials for the acquisition of several UH-60 Black Hawk helicopters. Kosovo currently has 3 air bases, and 15+ pilots and it is continuously training new pilots in the Albania, Turkey, and the United States.

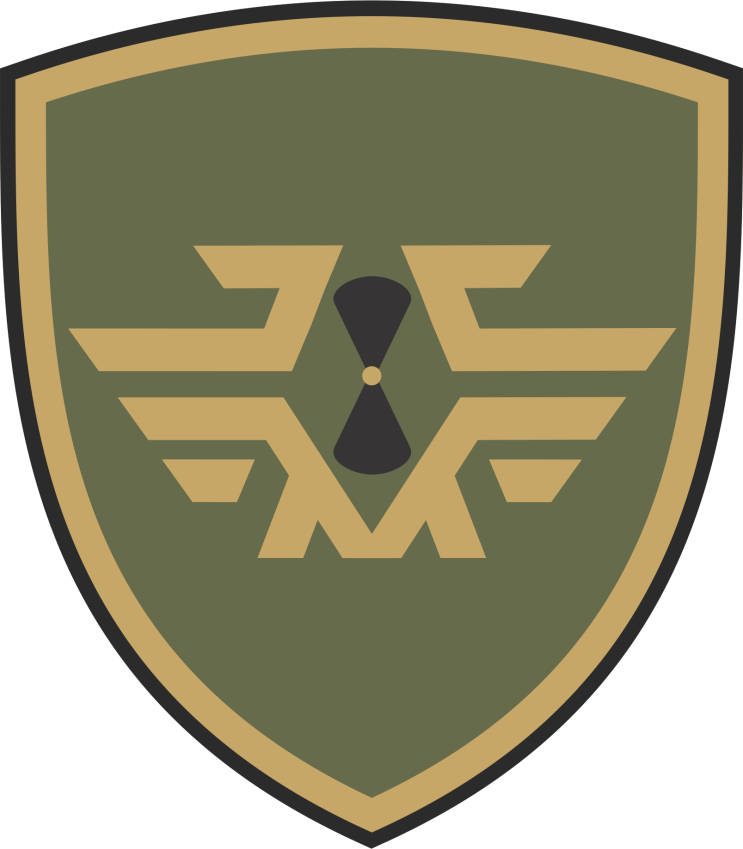
Aviation Unit Insignia

Roundel Insignia for KSF Aircraft

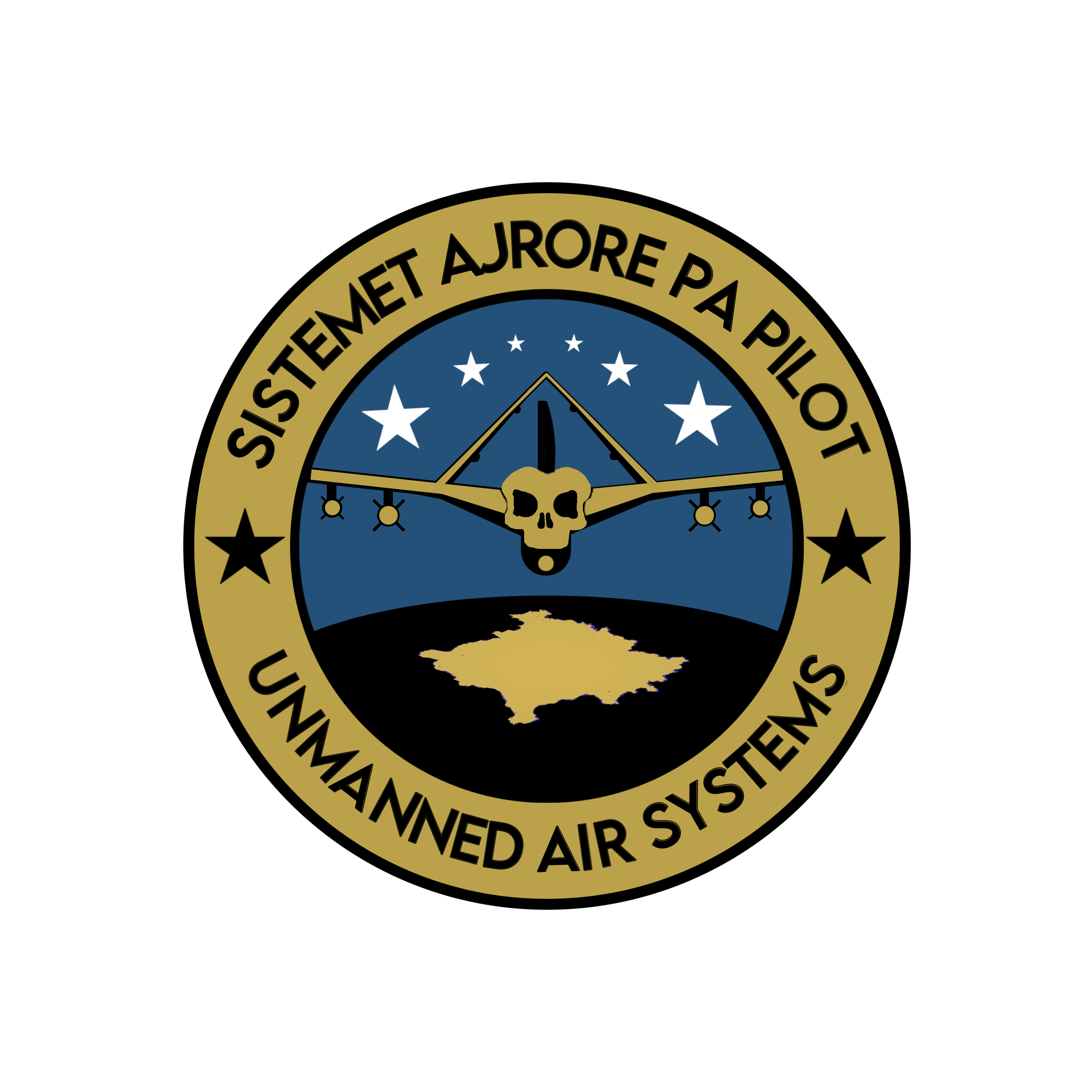
Unmanned Air Systems Insignia

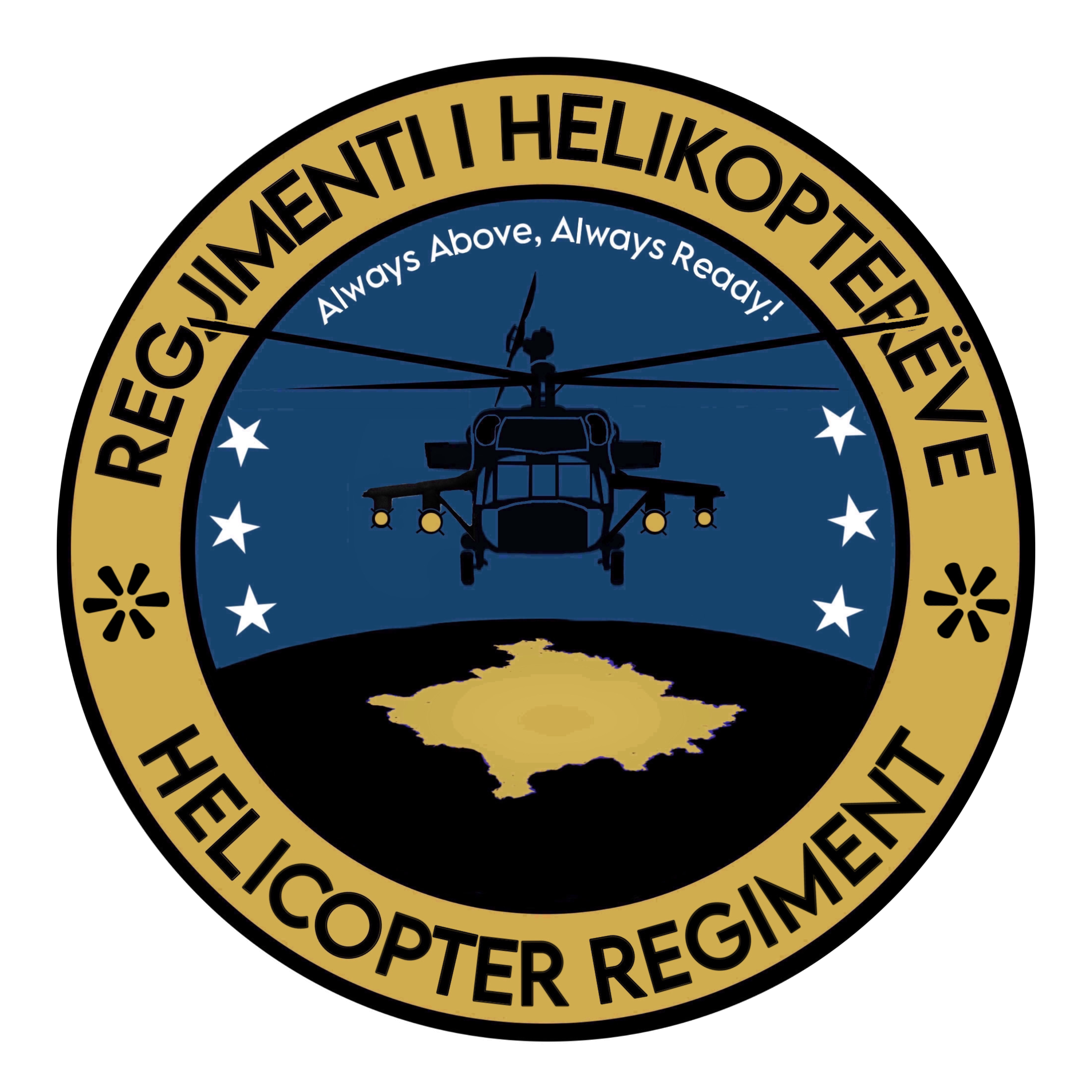
Helicopter Regiment Insignia

=== Military rank insignias ===
Officers

Rank group	General / flag officers			Senior officers			Junior officers
Kosovo Security Force
Kosovo Security Force	Gjenerallejtnant	Gjeneralmajor	Gjeneralbrigade	Kolonel	Nënkolonel	Major	Kapiten	Toger	Nëntoger

Enlisted

Rank group	Senior NCOs						Junior NCOs			Enlisted
Kosovo Security Force
Kosovo Security Force	Rreshter Major	Rreshter i Parë	Rreshter Master	Rreshter i Klasit të Parë	Rreshter i Stafit	Rreshter	Tetar	Specialist	Ushtar i Klasit të Parë	Ushtar

=== Medals and Decorations ===
Image	Number	Explanation	Reference
	1	Rank of the Military Officer or NCO.	Military Ranks of Kosovo
	2	Badges achieved by successfully completing any type of Army / Air Force school, such as Basic Parachutist Wings, Air Assault Wings or the Pilot wings in case of the officer being a pilot.	
	3	All Kosovo Military medal ribbons.	Bashkim Jashari
	4	Badge to be placed on the chest (in this case Golden German Armed Forces Badge for Military Proficiency)	
	5	Place where Aiguillette is placed ( After achievements or if an Attaché golden Aiguillette.	
	6	Place for leather-based badge.	/
	7	Badge for War College or other schools.	/
	8	Most of times, Kosovo Security Force Patch but in certain cases the Branch patch is used.	/
	9	The flag patch of the Republic Of Kosovo.	/

Image	Name	Explanation
	Medal of the Commander of KSF	Given by Commander LTG Bashkim Jashari.
	Medal for Humanitarian Merits	Given to the members of KSF after their service to save lives in different missions, such as in Turkey.
	Medal for Extraordinary Achievements	Given to the members of KSF after their Extraordinary Achievements in a certain field of serving. It is presented by Ministry of Defence.
	/	This is the Ribbon of Kosovo Armed Forces it still unknown until today.
	Medal for Participation in International Operations	Members of KSF that come back from a mission are awarded with this medal.
	Medal for Selfless Service	Awarded to KSF members and international military allies.
	Medal for Distinguished Service	Awarded to KSF members and international military allies.

== Military industry ==
A contract for the establishment of an ammunition factory in Kosovo has been signed with Turkey. Kosovo also plans to begin drone production.

Minister of defence of the Republic of Kosovo, Ejup Maqedonci has declared that Kosovo will be a co-producer of SHOTA, and that the production of this vehicle will start right after the final agreement which is expected to conclude in 2026.

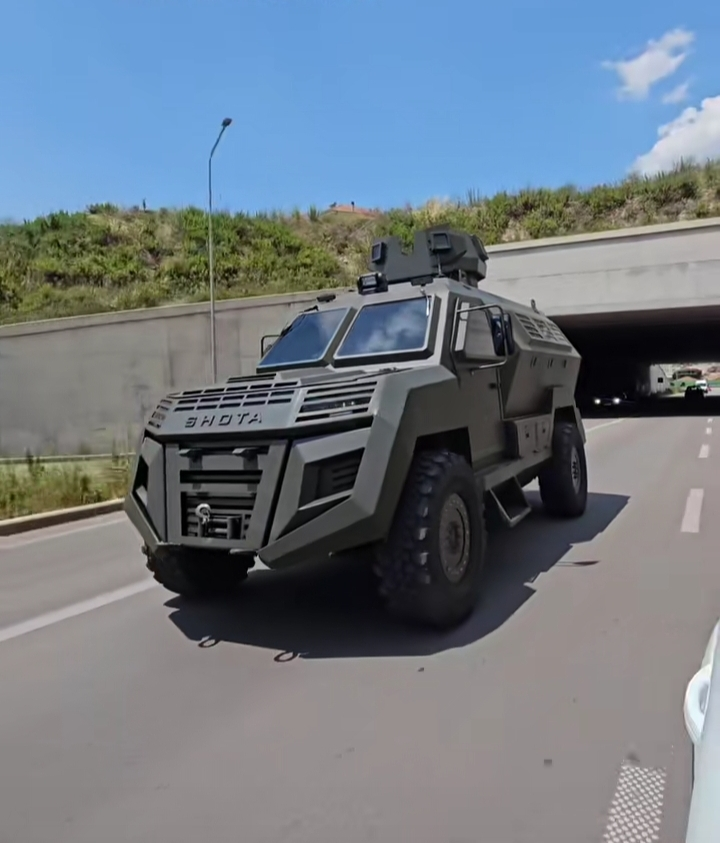
Trilateral-Agreement between Albania, Kosovo and Croatia to produce SHOTA.

== See also ==
- Kosovo Security Force Band
- Kosovo Defense Academy
