= Kosovo Protection Corps =

Civilian emergency services organization in Kosovo

- Trupat e Mbrojtjes së Kosovës
- Flag of the Kosovo Protection Corps
- Predecessor: Kosovo Liberation Army
- Successor: Kosovo Security Force
- Established: September 20, 1999
- Dissolved: June 14, 2009
- Type: Civilian emergency services
- Legal status: Defunct
- Purpose: Disaster response, search and rescue, humanitarian assistance, demining, rebuilding infrastructure and communities
- Headquarters: Pristina
- Location: Kosovo
- Budget: US$ 25.4 million (0.79%)
- Website: Archived website

The Kosovo Protection Corps (KPC; Albanian: Trupat e Mbrojtjes së Kosovës, TMK) was a civilian emergency services organization in Kosovo active from 1999 until 2009.

The KPC was created on 1999, through the promulgation of the United Nations Interim Administration Mission in Kosovo (UNMIK) Regulation 1999/8 and the agreement of a "Statement of Principles" on the KPC's permitted role in Kosovo. In effect, it was a compromise between the disarmament of the Kosovo Liberation Army, which was stipulated by United Nations Security Council Resolution 1244, and rejected by the Kosovo Albanians.

== History ==
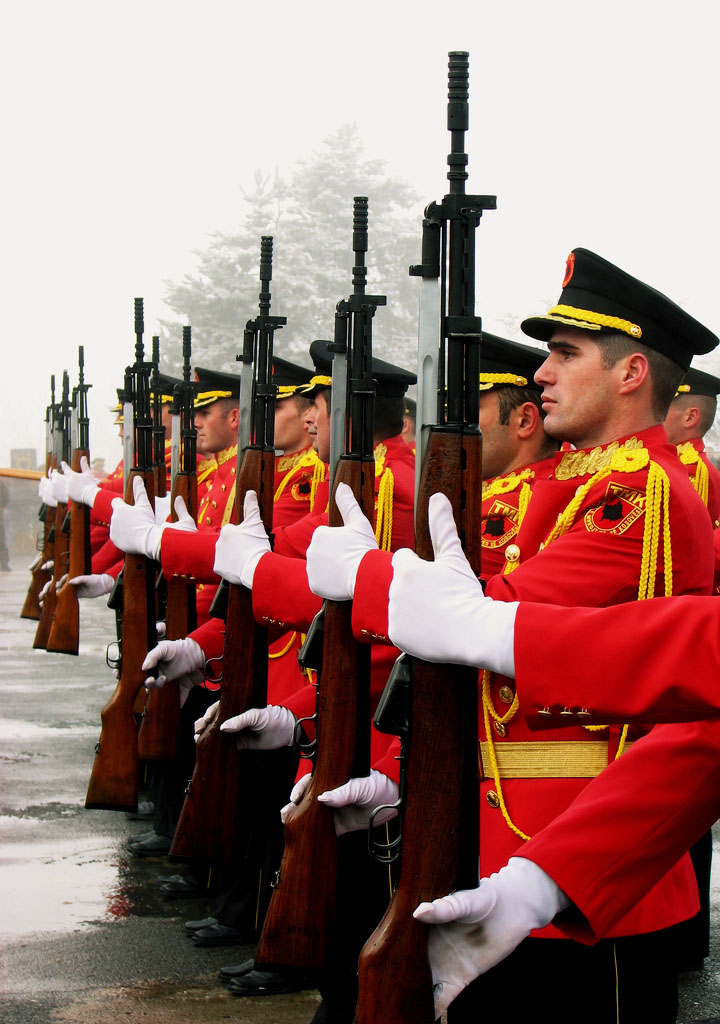
Kosovo Protection Corps members

Vehicle plate for the Kosovo Protection Corps

Immediately after the end of the Kosovo War in June 1999 and the dislocation of NATO forces in Kosovo, the need to define the role of the KLA emerged in accordance with the new situation. UNSC 1244, approved in June 1999, included KLA demilitarization. Therefore, the same month, KFOR Commander, General Mike Jackson and Hashim Thaçi, as General Commander of KLA, who at the time was Prime Minister of the Provisional Government in Kosovo, signed the Kumanovo Agreement. Upon the completion of the demilitarization process, on 20 September 1999 the UN Special Representative Bernard Kouchner signed Regulation no. 1999/8 for the foundation of the Kosovo Protection Corps (KPC), which then was followed by the Declaration of Principles, signed by the KPC Commander and the KFOR Commander. After the formation of the KPC, Serbs claimed it was a new ethnic Albanian army and resigned from the multiethnic Kosovo Transitional Council. Immediately following the approval of these acts, the International Organization for Migration (IOM) initiated the registration campaign for former KLA fighters, lasting from July to November 1999. According to IOM documents the total registration amounted to 25,723 members. Around 5,000 former KLA fighters joined KPC.

== Mission ==
UNMIK Regulation 1999/8 assigned the following tasks to the KPC:

- Provide a disaster response capability to tackle major fires, industrial accidents or toxic spills;
- Conduct search and rescue operations;
- Provide humanitarian assistance;
- Assist in demining;
- Contribute to rebuilding infrastructure and communities.

The Kosovo Protection Corps had no role in defense, law enforcement, riot control, internal security or any other law and order tasks. The Special Representative of the UN Secretary-General, the head of UNMIK, exercised direction, funding and administrative authority over the KPC. The Commander of KFOR, the NATO peacekeeping force, was in charge of exercising day-to-day supervision of the KPC. The KPC had 5,052 members, and a budget of €17.6 million (US$25.4 million) representing about 0.79% of GDP.

The KPC's first commander was Agim Çeku, who resigned from the organization in 2006 to become Prime Minister of Kosovo. KPC deputy commander Sylejman Selimi, a former KLA leader, replaced Çeku as commander. The KPC was divided into six regional "Protection Zones," each with a regional commander. By 2001, each had an explosive ordnance disposal team, and there was a further centrally controlled team, making a total of seven teams. There have been allegations that KPC was involved in criminal activities, illegal policing, killings and terrorist attacks against Serbs. UNMIK police officers claimed that KPC officers arrested for crimes were released on the orders of top regional KFOR commanders. In June 2001, several senior officers in the KPC were removed for suspicion of aiding the ethnic Albanian insurgency in the Republic of Macedonia. Prime Minister of Serbia Zoran Đinđić, in his last interview before his assassination, opposed transferring security responsibilities to the KPC. In August 2003, Deputy Prime Minister of Serbia Nebojša Čović accused the KPC and the Albanian National Army of being behind an attack on Serbs in Kosovo.

Kosovo Albanians considered the KPC a potential nucleus of a future Kosovo army. Finnish politician Martti Ahtisaari presented his proposal regarding the final status of Kosovo, where he suggested the dissolution of the KPC and the establishment of a lightly armed Kosovo Security Force (KSF). Due to a Russian veto, the United Nations Security Council did not endorse his proposal. Kosovo declared independence in February 2008. On January 20, 2009, KPC ceased its operations. Kosovo's Assembly passed the 'Law on the Dissolution of the Kosovo Protection Corps' in June. The organization disbanded on June 14. It was succeeded by the KSF.
