= Abedin Rexha =

Kosovo Liberation Army Soldier

- Born: 8 July 1969; Vojnik, Skenderaj, SAP Kosovo, SFR Yugoslavia (today Kosovo)
- Died: 8 October 1998 (aged 29); Klladërnica, Skenderaj, AP Kosovo, FR Yugoslavia (today Kosovo)
- Children: 2
- Military career
- Allegiance: Kosovo Liberation Army
- Service years: 1996-1998
- Rank: Commander
- Nickname: Komandant Sandokani
- Unit: 112th Brigade "Arben Haliti" of the KLA
- Conflicts: Insurgency in Kosovo (1995–1998); Qafë Prush ambush; November 1997 KLA operations in Kosovo; Vojnik clash; Battle of Rezalla; Kosovo War; KLA Summer offensive (1998); Yugoslav offensive in Drenica of August 1998; Yugoslav counter-offensive in Kosovo (1998); Central Drenica offensive; Klladërnica incident †
- Awards: Hero of Kosovo

Abedin Sokol Rexha (8 July 1969 — 8 October 1998), also known as Sandokani, was a Kosovar Albanian commander of the Kosovo Liberation Army (KLA), specifically of the 112th Brigade "Arben Haliti" during the Kosovar Insurgency and Kosovo War.

== Early life ==
He was born on July 8, 1969 in Vojnik, Skenderaj Municipality. He attended primary school in Turiçec, secondary school in Skenderaj, and continued his studies at the Faculty of Mining and Metallurgy in Mitrovica. During his secondary education in Skenderaj, he came into contact with illegal activists. At that time, he was associated with Jakup Nura and Nuhi Geci, with whom he was already organized and often distributed tracts and posters, calling for resistance against the Yugoslav state. Since the Yugoslav authorities had tracked down Abedin's activity, he left Kosovo in 1992.

== Military career ==
=== During the insurgency ===
He joined the KLA in 1996 and had a meeting with Adem Jashari.

He entered and left Kosovo multiple times. On May 6, 1997, Abedin, together with Fehmi Lladrovci, Xhevë Lladrovci, Luan Haradinaj, Ilaz Kodra, Ramiz Lladrovci and other KLA fighters attempted to cross the Prush Pass. On the way, the group fell into an ambush by Serbian forces and after the death of Luan Haradinaj, they were forced to withdraw from the border.

Two months later, in July 1997, Rexha together with Adrian Krasniqi, Ilaz Kodra, Ilir Konushevci and other freedom fighters managed to infiltrate Kosovo and worked tirelessly to expand and consolidate the ranks of the KLA.

On 25 November, KLA forces under Rexha forces repulsed a Serbian Police Patrol at Vojnik who were trying to capture him and killed two Serbian policemen. An 11-year-old child was wounded in the clash.

From 25 to 28 November 1997, the KLA led Operations throughout Kosovo targeting several police stations and Yugoslav Army positions. The Golesh aerodrome was attacked by the KLA, leaving five Yugoslav soldiers killed and one Cessna 310 was shot down. The Police stations in Irzniq, Skenderaj and Deçan were attacked leaving one Serbian officer killed and 4 others wounded.

On 26 November, the Yugoslav forces began crossing the Skenderaj-Klina road. On one side, the rebels were led by Adem Jashari, while on the other they were led by Sabit Geci, Adem Jashari and Sabit Geci gathered 22 KLA insurgents and waited in the narrow gorge surrounding the road in Ludoviq (now Rezallë e Re). When Yugoslav vehicles arrived, KLA insurgents fired on them, killing many and damaging Yugoslav artillery and vehicles. After the ambush, Yugoslav forces retreated to the village of Llaushë, where they shot two Albanian teachers working in the village's primary school, one of them being Halit Geci. Fighting would continue in the village of Rezallë-Ludoviq-Llaushë area, which would be captured by the KLA and led to the KLA gaining control over the Drenica region and became their stronghold throughout the war. The KLA suffered no losses in the Battle. On 28 November 1997, two days after, KLA groups from Drenica, joined by Daut Haradinaj of the Dukagjin region, assembled at the residence of Sabit Geci, where they drafted a declaration of war and agreed to publicize it during the funeral ceremony of the slain teacher, Halit Geci, where the first public appearance of the KLA occurred.

This battle is known for having been fought by some of the KLA’s most elite fighters. Many of its participants, such as Adem Jashari, Nuhi Geci, Abedin Rexha, Ilaz Kodra, and Mujë Krasniqi, would later become martyrs of the Kosovo War.

=== During the war ===
During 1998, the War continued to expand rapidly, and Abedin Rexha could not contain his anger against the Yugoslavs, who mercilessly massacred children, women, men and the elderly and burned the houses of Albanians.

At the beginning of August 1998, the General Staff of the KLA appointed Abedin Rexha as Commander of 112th Brigade "Arben Haliti" in the Drenica Operational Zone.

During the months of August–September 1998, Rexha fought in many battlefields in Drenica, especially during the offensives on Drenica in August and September. The offensive in August was initially a Yugoslav success and captured Llaushë and Likovac and established presence in the villages of Polac, Cerovik and Açarevë leading to thousands of Albanian civilians getting driven into the hills in early August, but withdrew from Drenica on 27 August due to KLA attacks on military points. In the offensive of September, the Yugoslav forces and Serbian Police captured six villages, however most of their advances were halted by KLA counterattacks in the villages of Prekaz i Eperm, Prekaz i Poshtem, Polac, Plozhine, Tica, Dobrosheci, Gllareva, Baicë, Gllobari, Çyçavica and were forced to withdraw later from Drenica due to international pressure and KLA counterattacks.

=== Death ===
He was killed after getting shot in the back in a forest in Klladërnica near Skenderaj on 8 October 1998 by Gani Geci, who allegedly collaborated with Serbian forces in the most recent Serbian offensive and led to massacres against the civilian popoulation of Drenica. In May 2014, Geci admitted he had killed Rexha but he acted in "self-defence", however Geci’s claim likely was false since he ambushed Rexha from behind. Rexha left behind 2 children.

== Legacy ==
A school in Turiçec, Skenderaj is named after him. He was awarded "Hero of Kosovo" by president Hashim Thaçi in 2017.

== Cited sources ==
- "U00385S2" (PDF). kosovo.sensecentar.com.
