= Rexhep Selimi =

Kosovar politician

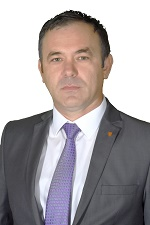

Parliamentary leader of Vetëvendosje
- In office 6 February 2020 – 5 November 2020
- Preceded by: Glauk Konjufca
- Succeeded by: Mimoza Kusari-Lila (acting)

Member of Parliament for Vetëvendosje
- In office 2013–2019

Minister of Public Order in the Provisional Government of Kosovo
- In office 1999–2000

Personal details
- Born: 15 March 1971 (age 55) Açarevë, Skënderaj, SFR Yugoslavia (now Kosovo)
- Party: Vetëvendosje
- Spouse: Shqipe Selimi
- Children: 2
- Occupation: Politician
- Known for: Founder and leader of the Kosovo Liberation Army
- Nickname(s): 10-shi ( nom de guerre )

Military service
- Allegiance: Kosovo Liberation Army Kosovo Protection Corps
- Rank: General Inspector of the KLA; Major General of the KPC
- Battles/wars: Insurgency in Kosovo (1995–1998); Kosovo War

Rexhep Selimi (born 15 March 1971) is a Kosovo-Albanian politician and former parliamentary leader of Vetëvendosje. He was also one of the founders and high-ranking commandants of the Kosovo Liberation Army. In 2026, he was convicted of war crimes during the Kosovo War by the Kosovo Specialist Chambers and sentenced to 13 years in prison.

== Early life ==
Rexhep was born in the Village of Açarevë, Skënderaj in the Drenica Valley and completed his primary education in Klinë and his secondary education at the "Luigj Gurakuqi" High School in Klinë. He pursued his university studies at the Faculty of Philology at the University of Pristina, majoring in Albanian Language and Literature.

== Involvement in Kosovo Liberation Army ==
Influenced by his older cousin, Mujë Krasniqi, Rexhep Selimi, along with others like Adem Jashari, founded the Kosovo Liberation Army (KLA) in the early 1990s. Due to Selimi's frequent resistance activities, his family faced severe harassment by the authorities. On January 13, 1994, police surrounded the home of Halil Krasniqi, demanding to know the whereabouts of his son, Mujë Krasniqi. Although he was tortured in front of his family, Halil refused to disclose any information. The police also mistreated Mujë's 13-year-old brother, Avni.

The following day, Serbian police officers captured Mujë Krasniqi and his comrade, Xhavit Shala, after further torture. Mujë was then forced into hiding, where he maintained secret connections with key figures like Adem Jashari, Sylejman Selimi, and Rexhep Selimi. Together, they organized the first armed actions against Yugoslav forces and smuggled weapons into Kosovo to support their fight for independence.

On October 10, 1996, Rexhep Selimi and his cousin Mujë Krasniqi were forced to flee from their homes and sought refuge with the Jashari family, while hiding together from the Yugoslav government. Around this time, Selimi's brother and a friend, Besnik Restelica, were arrested by Serbian authorities, with Restelica later dying under suspicious circumstances in a police station in Pristina.

On November 28, 1997, during the funeral of the teacher Halit Geci in Llaushë, Rexhep Selimi, along with Mujë Krasniqi and Daut Haradinaj, made the first public appearance of the KLA. In front of tens of thousands of mourners, Selimi, masked, publicly read a manifesto outlining the KLA's militant program. This event marked the KLA's emergence as an organized resistance force and was a significant moment in Kosovo Albanians' struggle against the Serbian regime. The appearance symbolized the beginning of open armed resistance, playing a crucial role in mobilizing support within the population for Kosovo's independence.

On September 22, 1998, during a large-scale Yugoslav offensive against the Drenica Operational Zone, Selimi and Krasniqi, along with other key KLA commanders like Sami Lushtaku and Sylejman Selimi, led the resistance in Central Drenica. Despite the overwhelming Serbian forces, armed with heavy weaponry and supported by motorized units, the KLA managed to withstand it. On September 27, 1998, Yugoslav forces massacred 26 members of the Deliu family in Abri, after not being able to break the KLA's resistance.

Rexhep Selimi and his cousin Mujë Krasniqi maintained a close relationship until he was killed in the harsh winter of 1998 during a fierce battle on the Pashtrik mountains along with 32 other KLA fighters in an ambush by Yugoslav forces. Selimi also served as the head of the Directorate of Operations in the KLA General Staff. Later, Selimi was appointed as the KLA's Chief Inspector in the rank of Major General.

== Political career ==
During the years 1999–2000, he held the position of Minister of Public Order in the Provisional Government of Kosovo.

From 2000 to 2003, Rexhep Selimi served as the Commander of the Defense Academy and the Commander of the Training and Doctrine Command in the (KPC).

In 2010 Selimi joined the opposition party Vetëvendosje and later became a Member of Parliament. On 6 February 2020 he became the Parliamentary leader of Vetëvendosje.

== War crimes trial ==
In November 2020 he was arrested for charges of crimes against humanity and war crimes filed before the Kosovo Specialist Chambers. The four defendants (Selimi, Hashim Thaçi, Kadri Veseli, and Jakup Krasniqi) were accused of pursuing a policy of torture and murder against civilians suspected of opposing the KLA during and after the Kosovo War. All four men pleaded not guilty, with the trial opening on 4 April 2023.

On 16 September 2026, they were found guilty of murder, torture, cruel treatment and arbitrary detention, and sentenced to prison. Selimi was sentenced to 13 years.
