= Mujë Krasniqi =

Kosovo Liberation Army soldier

- Born: 6 June 1967; Çabiqi, Klina, SFR Yugoslavia (today Kosovo)
- Died: 14 December 1998 (aged 31) near Gorozhup, Yugoslav–Albanian border, Albania
- Military career
- Allegiance: Kosova
- Branch: Kosovo Liberation Army
- Service years: 1990–1998
- Rank: Commander
- Nicknames: "Commander Kapuçi" "Komandant Kapuçi"
- Conflicts: Insurgency in Kosovo (1995–98): Battle of Rezalla; Kosovo War: Central Drenica offensive; Albanian–Yugoslav border ambush †
- Awards: Hero of Kosovo (posthumously)

Mujë Krasniqi (6 June 1967 – 14 December 1998), also known as Komandant Kapuçi (Commander Kapuçi), was one of the founders and early commanders of the Kosovo Liberation Army (KLA), who died during an Ambush of Serbian forces in Gorozhup, near the border of that time of Yugoslavia and Albania. Serving as an early fighter, coordinator of military operations, and a crucial link between the regions of Drenica, Dukagjin and Pashtrik during the initial phase of resistance against Serbian forces, he is regarded as a prominent leader and also a close comrade of Adem Jashari.

== Early life ==
Mujë Krasniqi was born on June 6, 1967, in the village of Çabiqi, Klina, Kosovo. He was one of fourteen children in a family facing difficult living conditions. Krasniqi completed his primary education in Ujmir and attended secondary school in Kijeva, where he was influenced by his teacher Xhevë Krasniqi, a noted activist. During his youth, Krasniqi witnessed significant political unrest in Kosovo, particularly the 1981 protests, which shaped his early sense of injustice and resistance against Yugoslav oppression.

== Involvement in the Kosovo Liberation Army ==
=== Founding the KLA and First Actions ===
Mujë Krasniqi along with others like Adem Jashari and Nuhi Geci, founded the Kosovo Liberation Army (KLA) in the early 1990s. On January 13, 1994, police surrounded the home of his father, demanding to know the whereabouts of his son. Although he was tortured in front of his family, Halil refused to disclose any information. The police also mistreated Mujë's 13-year-old brother, Avni.

The following day, Serbian police officers captured Mujë Krasniqi and his comrade, Xhavit Shala and were brutally beaten and detained. Mujë was then forced into hiding, where he maintained secret connections with key figures like Adem Jashari or his cousins Sylejman Selimi and Rexhep Selimi. Together, they organized the first armed actions against Yugoslav forces and smuggled weapons into Kosovo to support the Kosovar independence movement.

On October 10, 1996, Mujë Krasniqi and his cousin were forced to flee from their homes and sought refuge with the Jashari family, while hiding together from the Serbian regime.

On October 16, 1997, Mujë Krasniqi, alongside Adrian Krasniqi, Ilir Konushevci, and Qerim Kelmendi, attacked a Serbian police station in the village of Kliqina, near Peja. After a fierce exchange of gunfire, Adrian Krasniqi was killed, while the others managed to retreat. Three weeks after that, on November 28, 1997, during the funeral of the teacher Halit Geci in Llaushë, Rexhep Selimi, along with Mujë Krasniqi and Daut Haradinaj, made the first public appearance of the KLA. In front of tens of thousands of mourners, Selimi, masked, publicly read a manifesto outlining the KLA's militant program. This event marked the KLA's emergence as an organized resistance force and was a significant moment in Kosovo Albanians' struggle against the Serbian government. The appearance symbolized the beginning of open armed resistance, playing a crucial role in mobilizing support within the population for Kosovo's independence.

Between November 1997 and June 1998, Krasniqi operated in the Drenica and Dukagjin areas, playing a crucial role in securing illegal arms corridors and expanding the ranks of the KLA. He was instrumental in forming the elite combat unit "ALFA" of the KLA, which included prominent fighters such as Bekim Berisha, Besim Mala and Rasim Kiçina. He also participated in the Battle of Rezalla from 26 to 28 November 1997.

=== During the War ===
In April 1998, Krasniqi was seriously wounded on his leg during an operation in Kopiliq. He received medical treatment from a team led by Dr. Pashk Buzhala and underwent several surgeries performed by other KLA-affiliated doctors.

Despite his injuries, Krasniqi continued to lead significant military actions. In June 1998, he besieged Serbian forces in Kijeva and led a major attack in Gllareva. His forces inflicted heavy losses on the Serbian military, which even the heavily censored Serbian media acknowledged.

On July 3, 1998, during the Battle of Dollc, KLA fighter Muhamet Haxhaj was killed, and Krasniqi himself led another ambush in the same area on July 25, where he killed a high-ranking Yugoslav officer and fighting escalated in Dollc in which the KLA managed to drive out Yugoslav forces. Krasniqi was wounded again on July 28, but his comrade Izet Milazimaj managed to evacuate him to safety.

By August 2, 1998, still recovering from his injuries, Krasniqi was forced to retreat to the mountains after Yugoslav forces attacked Qabiq, where he had been sheltering. He continued to receive medical care from KLA doctors and remained active in the conflict despite his wounds.

On September 22, 1998, during a large-scale Yugoslav offensive against the Drenica Operational Zone, Krasniqi and Selimi, along with other key KLA commanders like Sami Lushtaku and Sylejman Selimi, led the resistance in Central Drenica. Despite the overwhelming Yugoslav forces, armed with heavy weaponry and supported by motorized units, the KLA managed to withstand it. On September 27, 1998, Yugoslav forces massacred 26 members of the Deliu family in Abri, after not being able to break the KLA's resistance.

Due to his deteriorating health, several doctors recommended the amputation of his wounded leg. As a result, Krasniqi's comrades decided to send him to Albania for medical treatment and to oversee the organization of further arms supplies for the KLA. In November 1998, Krasniqi led a group of fighters into Albania to secure weapons and ammunition for the ongoing conflict in Kosovo. He was appointed as the commander of this battalion due to his extensive knowledge of the terrain and leadership abilities.

During the harsh winter of 1998, Krasniqi felt a deep responsibility to ensure that LA forces were properly armed. Despite being sent to Albania primarily for medical treatment, his dedication to the cause and his comrades remained unwavering. He continued to lead the fighters in their struggle for Kosovo's independence.

== Death ==
On December 14, 1998, while leading a contingent of 143 KLA fighters transporting arms and ammunition from Albania to Kosovo through the Pashtrik Mountains, Krasniqi's unit was ambushed by Yugoslav forces near the Gorozhup area. In the ensuing battle, Krasniqi, along with 35 other fighters, including his brother Ali Krasniqi and close associate Beqir Gashi, were killed. Nine members of the unit were captured and later exchanged for Yugoslav officers held by the KLA.

== Legacy ==
In honor of Mujë Krasniqi's life, several recognitions have been awarded by the General Staff of the KLA, the Ministry of Defense of the Provisional Government of Kosovo, the Municipal Assembly of Klinë, and other institutions. Following his death, the 113th Brigade of Drenica was named after him. Each year, on his birthday, the traditional folkloric festival "I këndojmë lirisë" ("We Sing to Freedom") is held in the center of Klina in his memory. The town square in Klina bears his name. Similarly, the 313th Brigade of the Kosovo Protection Corps in Skënderaj was also named in his honor. Krasniqi was posthumously awarded the title of Hero of Kosovo in recognition of his contributions.

A monograph titled "Mujë Krasniqi: A Life for Freedom," written by his comrade Bedri Gashi, has been published in his memory. Additionally, various writings, poems, and songs celebrating his legacy have been created. Mujë Krasniqi was known not only for his military prowess but also for his love of patriotic songs, which he sang with fellow fighters to boost morale during battles. Alongside his comrade Beqë Sefë Gashi and his cousin Rexhep Selimi, he composed and performed songs that became symbolic anthems for the KLA ( like Kreshtat e Kosovës).
