= Izbica (disambiguation) =

Izbica may refer to:

- Izbica in Lublin Voivodeship (east Poland)
  - Izhbitza (Hasidic dynasty)
- Izbica, Masovian Voivodeship (east-central Poland)
- Izbica, Pomeranian Voivodeship (north Poland)
- Izbica, Kosovo, a village in the Skenderaj municipality of northern Kosovo
  - Izbica massacre
