= Rasim Kiçina =

Kosovo Liberation Army soldier

- Born: 25 August 1972; Baicë, Drenas, SFR Yugoslavia (today Kosovo)
- Died: 30 May 1999 (aged 26); Road between Negroc and Arllat, Drenas, FR Yugoslavia (today Kosovo)
- Military career
- Allegiance: Kosova
- Branch: Kosovo Liberation Army
- Service years: 1995–1999
- Rank: Lieutenant colonel Colonel general (posthumously)
- Conflicts: Insurgency in Kosovo (1995–98) Kosovo War: Attacks on Likoshane and Çirez; Battle of Llapushnik; KLA Summer offensive (1998); Ambush near Arllat †
- Awards: Hero of Kosovo (posthumously)

Rasim Kiçina (25 August 1972 – 30 May 1999) was a commander of the Kosovo Liberation Army and early member of the General Staff of the KLA, who was killed in an ambush near Arllat during the Kosovo War.

== Early life ==
Rasim Kiçina was born on August 25, 1972, in Banjica, Drenica, into a modest but respected family known for their resistance against foreign rule. His grandfather had taken up arms against governing authorities, a tradition of defiance that influenced Rasim's upbringing.

Rasim completed his primary education in Baicë, where he was known for his academic abilities and athletic physique. In 1987, he enrolled in the "Skenderbeu" high school in Drenica, where he stood out not only in academics but also in sports, particularly football. He was sociable and well-liked by other students.

However, an important event occurred in 1992 when Rasim, still in high school, confronted two armed Serbian police officers who were harassing Albanian passengers on a train. Rasim disarmed and struck the officers to unconsciousness in front of the harassed passengers. This act marked the beginning of his active resistance against Serbian authorities.

== Involvement in the Kosovo Liberation Army ==
=== First actions of the KLA ===
Rasim Kiçina's early acts of resistance did not go unnoticed. Commanders of the Kosovo Liberation Army, including the Adem Jashari, became aware of his courage. By the early 1990s Rasim established contacts with key members of the Kosovo Albanian political resistance and had aligned himself with the People's Movement of Kosovo.

In the fall of 1995, Rasim joined a fighting group led by Musa Jashari, a relative of Adem Jashari. Alongside other fighters, Rasim participated in military training and preparations for armed resistance against the Serbian regime. His house in Baicë became a safe haven for KLA fighters, and he frequently traveled to Albania to acquire weapons for the armed resistance.

=== During the War ===
By 1996, Rasim Kiçina had intensified his involvement in the armed resistance. He was part of numerous armed actions carried out by the KLA, targeting Serbian police and military units. He participated in the Battle of Likoshan in 1998. Rasim distinguished himself in combat, particularly for his ability to lead and his use of heavy weaponry. He was also part of the elite combat unit "ALFA" of the KLA, which included prominent fighters such as Mujë Krasniqi, Bekim Berisha or Besim Mala.

Rasim became a key figure in organizing military resistance in the Drenica region. He established a KLA military base in Baicë and helped train new recruits. Throughout 1998, he participated in numerous battles, including defending strategic positions in Baicë or Kijevo.

Rasim also played a significant role in facilitating arms shipments from Albania, leading several missions to bring back much-needed weapons and ammunition for the KLA fighters in Drenica.

== Death ==
On May 30, 1999, while on a mission with several other KLA fighters, Rasim Kiçina was ambushed by Serbian forces near the village of Arllat in the Drenica region. He and his comrade, Ragip Halilaj, were killed in the attack. His body was buried by fellow fighters in the nearby village of Negroc.

== Legacy ==
Rasim Kiçina is remembered as one of the most dedicated key fighters of the KLA. His actions are seen as heroic and sacrificial by Kosovar Albanians, leaving a lasting impact on the memory of his fellow soldiers and people. In recognition of his contribution to the fight for Kosovo's independence, he was awarded with the title "Hero of Kosovo" and in 2019, the President of Kosovo, Hashim Thaqi, inaugurated the statues of Kiçina and Bedri Shala, in their hometown Drenas. The Drenas Municipal Assembly also named an elementary school after him, and a memorial plaque marks the site where he fell in Arllat.
