= Poklek massacre =

1999 mass execution in Poklek, Kosovo

- Part of the Kosovo War
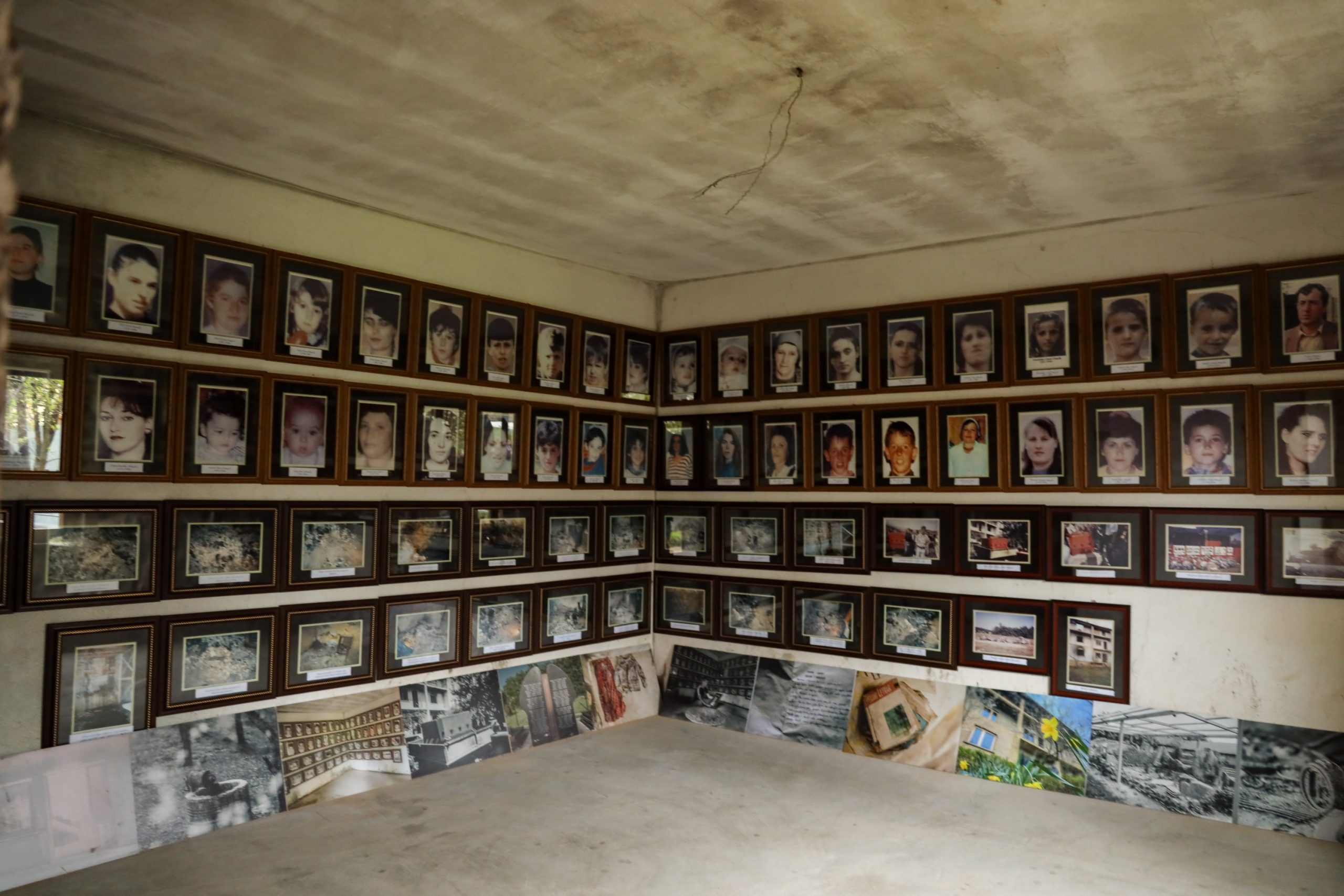
- Photographs of the victims
- Native name: Masakra e Poklekut
- Location: 42.624°N 20.913°E; Poklek, Drenas, Kosovo
- Date: 17 April 1999; 27 years ago (Central European Time)
- Target: Kosovo Albanians
- Attack type: Mass killing
- Deaths: 53 of which 24 children
- Injuries: 6
- Perpetrator: Serbian forces
- Motive: Anti-Albanian sentiment, ethnic cleansing
- Convicted: None

The Poklek massacre (Albanian: Masakra e Poklekut) refers to the killing of 53 Albanian civilians, of which 24 children, in the village of Poklek, near Drenas, Kosovo. The massacre happened on the 17th of April, 1999 and was carried out by the Serbian forces during the end of the Kosovo War, with the motives of ethnic cleansing against Albanians in Kosovo and anti-Albanian sentiment.

== Execution ==
At approximately 16:00 of 17 April, Serbian paramilitary and police units entered the yard of Sinan Muqolli’s house. In a room where 57 civilians had taken refuge, primarily women and children, officers started shooting, then threw a smoke grenade followed by a fragmentation grenade. Moments later, one officer entered the room and opened fire with an automatic rifle. The attack resulted in the immediate death of 51 individuals inside the house, while two others, including the homeowner Sinan and the guest Ymer, were executed outside.

They started shooting with automatic weapons, then opened the door and threw a grenade. There were screams, pure terror. Then he came inside and started shooting us with the automatic rifle. I was wounded in my left arm.

— Hysen Kluna, survivor of the massacre

Amongst the victims were 24 children of whom the youngest victim were two infants under one year of age, 4 and 10 months old; the oldest victims included elderly civilians.

After the policemen initially left the scene, six individuals who had survived the assault managed to escape. However, the perpetrators soon returned, this time carrying two containers filled with gasoline, which they used to set fire to the bodies. Bodies were later reportedly burned, an act consistent with attempts to destroy forensic evidence. The burned bodies were found a day later.

One of the survivors who was 14 years old at the time of the massacre reportedly stated:

It was deeply harrowing, the noise, the screaming, the desperate efforts to save the children, and no one able to do anything at all.

— Elhame Muqolli

It was later reported that the ceiling of the basement beneath the execution room had been stained with blood that had seeped through the floorboards, an indication of the massacre’s brutality. One source states that on the same day of the massacre, a battle had previously taken place in the mountain of Çyçavica in Drenica, the Yugoslav offensive on Çyçavica had failed and may have caused the Poklek massacre.

== Aftermath ==
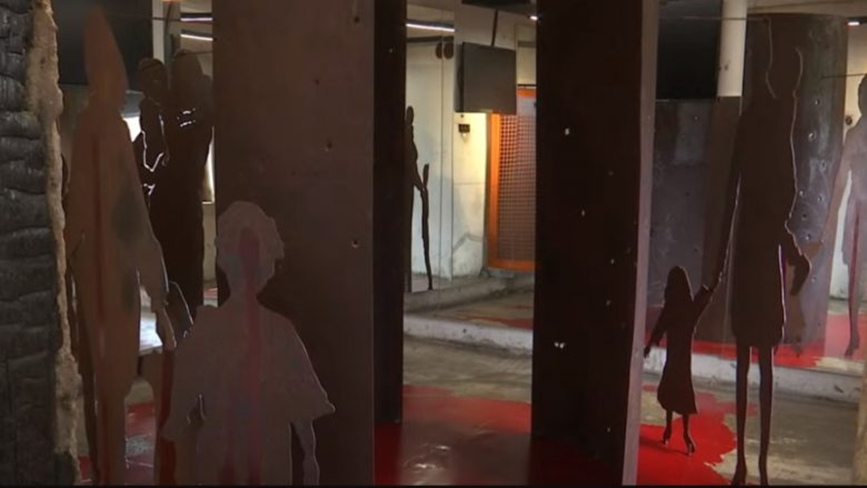
The house where the massacre took place became a museum.

Twenty-five years after the victims met their untimely deaths there, the house has become a museum, showing the personal belongings of the victims and photographs taken shortly after the massacre.

The president of Kosovo, Vjosa Osmani, paid tribute at the memorial complex in Poklek where she stated:

Here in Poklek, a real Holocaust took place. As you already know, 54 members of the Muqolli, Elshani and other families, mostly women and children, in fact, the vast majority of them children, were first executed, then burned twice in order to eliminate the traces of this heinous crime carried out by the Serbian forces in Kosovo.

— Vjosa Osmani, the president of Kosovo

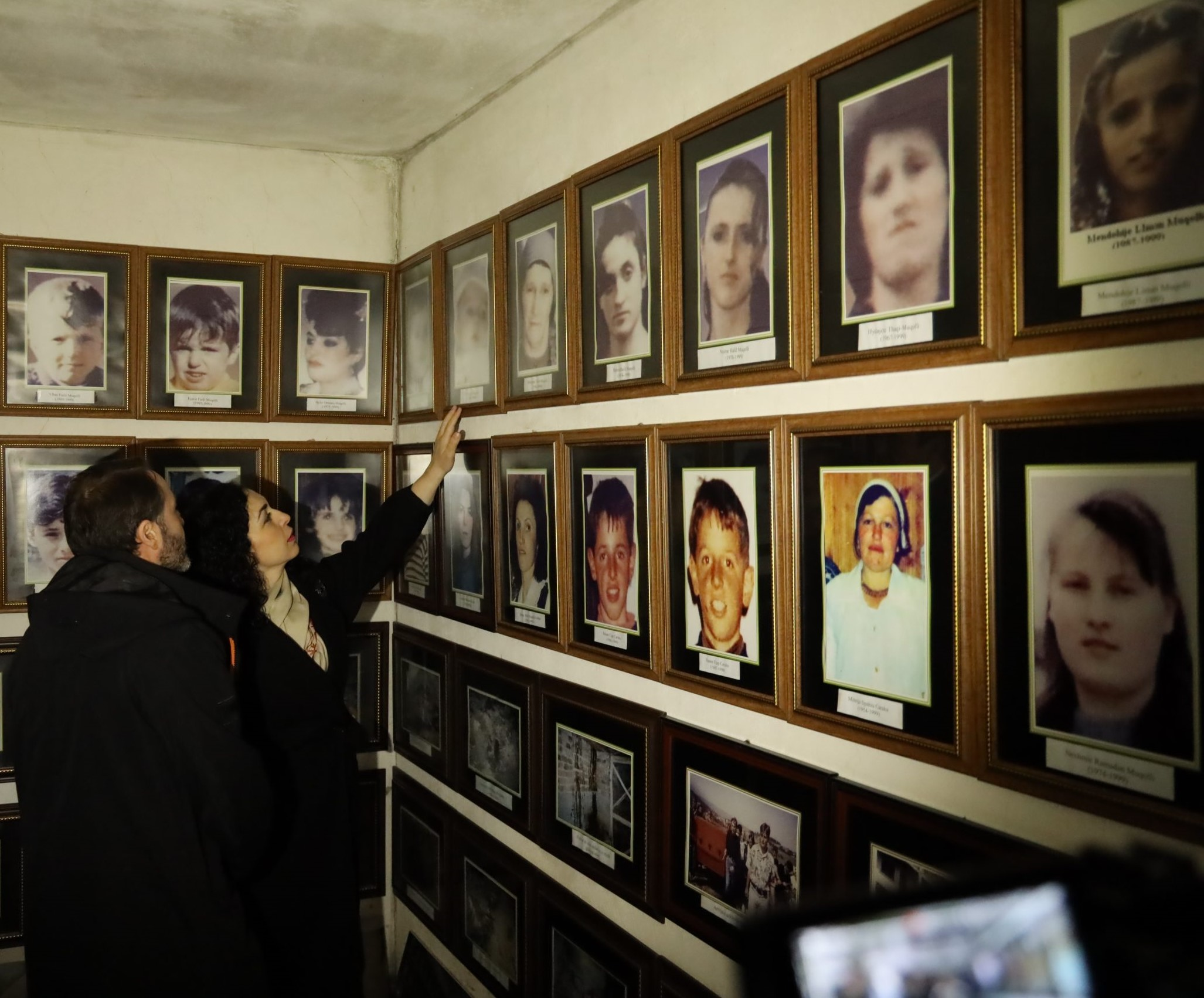
The President of Kosovo, Vjosa Osmani, paying tribute to the victims of the Poklek massacre. In the photo, she is seen looking at an image of the youngest victim.

The former head of the Kosovo Assembly and one of the Kosovo Liberation Army founders and leaders, Kadri Veseli while marking the 20th anniversary of the massacre stated:

Many things could be forgotten and forgiven in a human life, but we will never forget Serbia’s massacres in Kosovo. We will never forgive them.

— Kadri Veseli, former head of the Kosovo Assembly

To this day, no one yet has been persecuted for this crime against humanity.

== See also ==
- Drenica massacres
- List of massacres in Kosovo
