= Baicë =

Baicë: Baicë (Albanian); Бањица/Banjica (Serbian)
- Village
- Location within Kosovo
- Coordinates: 42.520247°N 20.914831°E
- Location: Kosovo
- District: Prishtinë
- Municipality: Drenas

Population (2024)
  - Total: 1,965
- Time zone: UTC+1 (Central European Time)
  - Summer (DST): UTC+2 (CEST)

Baicë is a village in the District of Pristina, Kosovo. It is located southwest of Pristina, south of Komorane.

== History ==
=== Kosovo War ===
In late September 1998 during an offensive in Drenica in the Kosovo War, a battle took place in the village of Baicë in which the Kosovo Liberation Army later pushed out Yugoslav forces and inflicted heavy losses on Serb forces.

== Notable people ==
- Rasim Kiçina, KLA commander
