= Vlastimir Đorđević =

Serbian general (born 1948)

- Властимир Ђорђевић
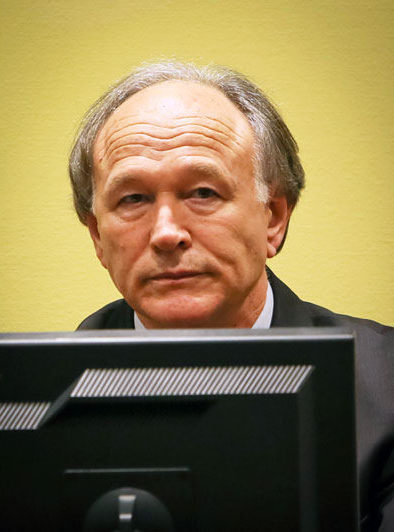
- Đorđević on trial in September 2014
- Born: 17 November 1948 (age 77); Vladičin Han, PR Serbia, FPR Yugoslavia
- Education: University of Belgrade
- Military career
- Allegiance: (Federal Republic of Yugoslavia) FR Yugoslavia
- Branch: Serbian police
- Service years: until 2001
- Nickname: Рођа
- Conflicts: Insurgency in Kosovo; Pestovë ambush; Kosovo war; Attack on Prekaz; Yugoslav offensive in Kosovo (1998); Yugoslav September offensive; Central Drenica offensive; Račak fighting (1999)
- Awards

Vlastimir Đorđević (Serbian Cyrillic: Властимир Ђорђевић; born 17 November 1948) is a Serbian former police colonel general. For his role in the Kosovo War, he was found guilty of war crimes, including murder, against Kosovo Albanians by the International Criminal Tribunal for the former Yugoslavia (ICTY) at The Hague.

== Life and career ==
Đorđević was born in Koznica, Vladičin Han, PR Serbia. He graduated from the University of Belgrade Faculty of Law. Đorđević was Assistant Minister of the Ministry of Internal Affairs of Serbia, and Chief of the Public Security Department of the Ministry of Internal Affairs in 1997. On 27 January 1998 he became Chief of Public Security Department of the MUP, and participated in the Kosovo War.

== ICTY trial and sentence ==
In 2003, he was indicted by the International Criminal Tribunal for the former Yugoslavia (ICTY) for war crimes and crimes against humanity during the 1999 Serb crackdown on Kosovo Albanian citizens. As Chief of the Public Security Department, he was responsible for ensuring that all units of the Public Security Department in Serbia for Kosovo carried out their orders. Until June 2007, he was believed to be in Russia. On the morning of 17 June 2007, Đorđević was arrested in Montenegro, near the city of Budva. He was transferred to The Hague for his trial.

On 23 February 2011, the ICTY ruled Đorđević guilty of all charges made against him: persecutions on political, racial, and religious grounds, murder, inhumane acts (forcible transfer) and deportation. He was declared one of the participants of a joint criminal enterprise, which included Slobodan Milošević, aimed at removing the Albanian population from Kosovo, and given 27 years' imprisonment. Crimes that he was convicted of included the Bela Crkva massacre, the Krusha massacres, the Suva Reka massacre, the Izbica massacre, the Meja massacre, the Vushtrri massacre, and the Podujevo massacre.

The Appeals Chamber of the International Residual Mechanism for Criminal Tribunals (IRMCT) reduced his sentence to 18 years' imprisonment on 27 January 2014. He was transferred to Germany to serve out his sentence. The Appeals Chamber accepted that he was not responsible for the murders in Podujevo and Krushe, nor for displacements in Kladernica, Suva Reka, Brocna and Ćuska. However, it additionally found Đorđević guilty of persecutions through sexual assault as a crime against humanity. Specifically, an Albanian girl traveling in a convoy from Grashticë in April 1999 was taken away by a Serb police officer and a paramilitary soldier who both assaulted her in the woods; two Albanian girls were detained and raped in Beleg in March 1999;

Ðorđević was released in June 2025.

== See also ==
- Vučitrn massacre
- Operation Horseshoe
- Nebojša Pavković
- Vladimir Lazarević
- Sreten Lukić
- Batajnica mass graves
