= Kosovo Intelligence Service =

Underground intelligence organization

Kosovo Intelligence Service (Alb. Shërbimi Informativ i Kosovës) more commonly known by its Albanian acronym SHIK was an underground intelligence organization credited with post-war murders of political figures in Kosovo. SHIK reported its official disbandment in 2008. Key figures in SHIK were former Speaker of the Assembly of the Republic of Kosovo, Kadri Veseli, and MPs Elmi Reçica, Fadil Demaku, Bekim Haxhiu and former MPs Fatmir Xhelili and Latif Gashi, Trepça CEO Ferat Shala and Ilmi Ramadani.

The SHIK emerged from the ranks of the Kosovo Liberation Army (UÇK), following the end of the war with Serbia in 1999, and then became the intelligence arm of the now ruling Democratic Party of Kosovo (PDK).

Following the November 2009 release of a video confession of a self-proclaimed political assassin, Nazim Bllaca, the European Union Rule of Law Mission in Kosovo (EULEX) made four arrests during the year on suspicion of more than 20 politically motivated killings during the period 1999-2003. Bllaca and the three others arrested in the case are suspected of murder and attempted murder of political figures under orders from the Kosovo Information Service (SHIK), which served the Kosovo Liberation Army (UÇK) until the end of the Kosovo conflict. The investigation in the case continued at year's end. On July 13, EULEX police arrested Fahredin Gashi in connection to the investigation. Gashi was charged with war crime offenses committed in 1999 in the Lipjan municipality. The secret service is widely believed to have eliminated the PDK's political rivals during 2000 and 2001, although this has never been proven in court.

A published report by EULEX suggests that dozens of senior political figures and activists from the Democratic League of Kosovo (LDK) were killed after the end of the Kosovo conflict for political reasons. The report also alleges that the Democratic Party of Kosovo, which ruled Kosovo until 2021, pursued a strategy of killing its political opponents after the end of the war in Kosovo in the late 1990s and early 2000s.

The president of the LDK Isa Mustafa has asked EULEX to provide the party with a full report, and shed light on the post-war political assassinations. The LDK has accused SHIK in the past of being behind the assassinations of its members, but these claims were rejected by SHIK's former boss, Kadri Veseli.

Kosovo MPs attempted to conduct a parliamentary investigation into SHIK in 2012 however they could not muster the necessary votes.

According to an organisational chart deposited to the court by Kadri Veseli in the Bllaca case, he was head of SHIK, followed by Elmi Reqica as deputy chief. Latif Gashi was Executive Director whereas Fatmir Xhelili led Organized Crime Directorate, Fadil Demaku headed the Anti-terrorism Directorate and Ferat Shalaled the Intelligence Directorate, while Ilmi Ramadani headed the Information and Analysis Directorate. According to Veseli, SHIK had 32 members when it was set up and 92 in 2008.
