= Çabiqi =

Çabiqi: Çabiqi (Albanian); Чабић/Čabić (Serbian)
- Village
- Location in Kosovo
- Location: Kosovo
- District: Peja
- Municipality: Klina

Population (2024)
  - Total: 606
- Time zone: UTC+1 (CET)
  - Summer (DST): UTC+2 (CEST)

Çabiqi (Serbian Cyrillic: Чабић, Albanian: Çabiqi) is a settlement in the municipality of Kline, Kosovo.

It is the birthplace of Commander Mujë Krasniqi known by his nickname Kapuqi. Çabiqi borders with three other villages Caravik, Zabergjë and Ujmir.

== See also ==
- Mujë Krasniqi
- Sejdi Kadri Gashi
- List of settlers - Kline
- Sawn location in Çabiq
- Church of St. Nicholas (Çabiq)

== Demographics ==
Çabiqi has consistently had a majority ethnic Albanian population Population during 1948-1991

Year - 1948: 390

Year - 1953 440

Year - 1961: 580

Year - 1971 714

Year - 1981: 956

Year - 1991: 1136
