= Fehmi Lladrovci =

Kosovo Liberation Army soldier (1956 – 1998)

- Born: 15 May 1956; Shkabë, Drenas, Kosovo, Yugoslavia
- Died: 22 September 1998 (aged 42) near Shkabë, Kosovo, Yugoslavia
- Military career
- Allegiance: Croatia (1991–1993); Kosova (from 1997)
- Branch: Yugoslav People's Army (deserted); Croatian Army; Kosovo Liberation Army
- Service years: 1991–1993; 1997–1998
- Rank: Commander
- Conflicts: Croatian War of Independence (until 1993); Bosnian War; Insurgency in Kosovo (1995–1998); Kosovo War: Battle of Bardhi I Madh; KLA spring offensives (1998); Battle of Llapushnik; Yugoslav offensive in Kosovo (1998); Central Drenica offensive †
- Awards: Hero of Kosovo

Fehmi Lladrovci (15 May 1956 – 22 September 1998) was a commander of the Kosovo Liberation Army (KLA). During the Yugoslav Wars, he was participated in the Croatian War of Independence (1991–1993) and later in the Kosovo War (1998–1999). Alongside his wife, Xhevë Krasniqi–Lladrovci, he was killed in battle against the Serbian forces during Central Drenica offensive on 22 September 1998.

== Early life ==
He completed primary school in Dobrashec and secondary school at the technical school "19 Nëntori" in Pristina, specializing in machinery. During his early years, Lladrovci was influenced by patriotic ideas, largely shaped by his teacher, Fazli Graiqevci, a noted nationalist. His activism led to surveillance by the Yugoslav secret police during his high school years.

After excelling in secondary school, Lladrovci continued his studies in Zagreb, where he connected with fellow patriots and coordinated with underground groups. In the early 1980s, he and his wife, Xhevë Krasniqi, became active members of the People's Movement of Kosovo (Albanian: LPK ), working towards the mobilization of Kosovo Albanians and others under Yugoslav rule for national liberation.

== Military career ==
=== Imprisonment and early activities ===
In September 1985, due to his underground political activities, Lladrovci was arrested by Serbian security forces and sentenced to 10 years in prison, serving time in various prisons in Kosovo in Pristina or Gjilan and later in notorious political prisons like Lepoglava prison and Stara Gradiška prison in Croatia. He was released early in 1991 following a Croatian amnesty for political prisoners, just as the Yugoslav People's Army entered the Croatian conflict. Lladrovci, together with Jashar Prenku from Dobrashec and Mehmet Uka from Gradica, along with many other Albanians, joined Croatian forces, participating in numerous battles.

In 1993, Lladrovci moved to Munich, Germany where he became an active member of the Albanian diaspora. During this time, he emerged as a key figure within the early leadership of the KLA. He also served as the head of the LPK branch in Germany, contributing to the political and military efforts of the Kosovo Liberation Army.

=== First engagements in the KLA ===
On May 6, 1997, Lladrovci was with his wife Xhevë and several fellow combatants, including Luan Haradinaj, Ramush Haradinaj and Ali Ahmeti when they were ambushed by Serbian border forces, resulting to the fierce Battle of Qafë Prush. Luan Haradinaj was killed in the skirmish, while Lladrovci and others sustained minor injuries.

On March 11, 1998, just days after the Prekaz massacre, Lladrovci, alongside his wife and other key figures like Bekim Berisha and Ismet Jashari, successfully infiltrated Kosovo to join the ongoing resistance efforts. At this time, the Drenica region was heavily shelled by Serbian forces.

=== Kosovo War ===
Following his return to Kosovo, Lladrovci and his wife were stationed at the military point in the village of Rezallë, near Skënderaj. They later moved to Abri, joining forces with other KLA units. As the KLA expanded and consolidated its operations, Lladrovci and his comrades established a new base at the Baicë Tunnel near Elshan.

In May 1998, Lladrovci played a crucial role in capturing the Llapushnik Gorge, a strategically important location. The operation was marked by intense fighting, during which several KLA fighters, including Besim Halilaj, were killed. It ended in the Kosovo Liberation Army being victorious against Serbian forces.

Lladrovci's leadership was further highlighted in an interview he gave to the BBC May 1998, where he articulated the political philosophy of the KLA. Responding to accusations of terrorism by Serbian authorities, Lladrovci challenged them to provide evidence of any acts of terrorism committed by the KLA, contrasting this with the widespread atrocities perpetrated by Serbian forces against Kosovar Albanians.

In June 1998, Lladrovci and his unit were deployed to Shkabaj, where they established and fortified multiple KLA positions across the region. These units, referred to as "Shkaba"(Eagle), were strategically placed to cover various territories, including Çikatovë, Gllanasellë, and Gradicë.

On June 10, 1998, Lladrovci, along with key KLA members, successfully sabotaged the railway line between Fushë-Kosovë and Pejë, disrupting Serbian military logistics. By late June, at the request of Mensur Kasumi, the KLA commander of the Shala Zone, Lladrovci, along with 12 of his closest comrades, went to assist in consolidating the ranks in that area.

The Battle of Hade, fought on June 30, 1998, was one of the significant engagements under Lladrovci's command. The KLA, armed with heavy weaponry, managed to inflict substantial damage on Serbian forces, despite suffering casualties.

Following the intense battles during the summer of 1998, Lladrovci was a key figure in establishing the 114th Brigade of the Drenica Operational Zone. The brigade was tasked with defending a large territory, stretching from the Drenas to the eastern side of Çyçavicë to villages in Fushë-Kosovë . Lladrovci was appointed as the brigade commander, with Ilaz Kodra as his deputy.

== Death ==
On September 22, 1998, during a Serbian military offensive in the Drenica region of Kosovo, Lladrovci and his forces, part of the KLA, were tasked with defending key positions against a major assault by Serbian forces.

On the morning of September 22, Serbian troops advanced along the Komoran-Drenas-Skenderaj axis, targeting the positions of the KLA's 114th and 113th Brigades in Drenica. From a lookout point in Kozmaç, intelligence regarding the Serbian advance was relayed to KLA units. As a prominent figure in the 114th Brigade, Lladrovci took command of reinforcing critical defensive positions, including units known as Shkaba I, Shkaba II, and Shkaba III.

During the battle, Lladrovci demonstrated leadership by organizing the defense and encouraging his fighters. He was stationed at a key position called Gradina, where he and his comrades, including his wife Xhevë Krasniqi-Lladrovci and other KLA fighters, engaged in close combat with Serbian forces.

As the confrontation intensified, Serbian troops attempted to flank Lladrovci's position. Despite strong resistance from the KLA fighters, Serbian forces succeeded in encircling the area. In the course of the conflict, Lladrovci reportedly destroyed a Serbian tank with a rocket-propelled grenade. However, the Serbian forces continued their offensive.

Lladrovci was fatally wounded by enemy fire during the battle. As the situation became increasingly dire, KLA fighters began to retreat. However, Xhevë Krasniqi-Lladrovci chose to remain and continue fighting alongside her husband, despite the dangers. Amongst Kosovar Albanians, her decision to stay is seen as a reflection of her dedication to both the Kosovo liberation cause and her personal loyalty to Lladrovci.

In October 1998, the KLA's 114th Brigade was renamed in honor of Lladrovci. His leadership and sacrifice are commemorated in several memorials, including the "Kulla e Qëndresës" (The Tower of Resistance) located at the site of his final battle.

== Legacy ==
Lladrovci's contributions to the Kosovo War are also honored by the naming of the Technical High School in Drenas after him, as well as various recognitions and awards posthumously bestowed by the Government and the General Staff of the KLA. Xhevë Krasniqi-Lladrovci's role in the final battle and her decision to stay and die alongside her husband highlighted her dedication.

Both he and his wife are remembered by ethnic Albanians as symbols of personal and collective sacrifice.

== Books ==
- "Drenica djep i UÇK-së dhe Batalioni I i Brigadës 114 "Fehmi Lladrovci""; Publishing House "Meshari", 304 p., Pristina/Kosovo 2017. ISBN 9789951734547
