= United Nations Security Council Resolution 1203 =

United Nations Security Council resolution

UN Security Council Resolution 1203
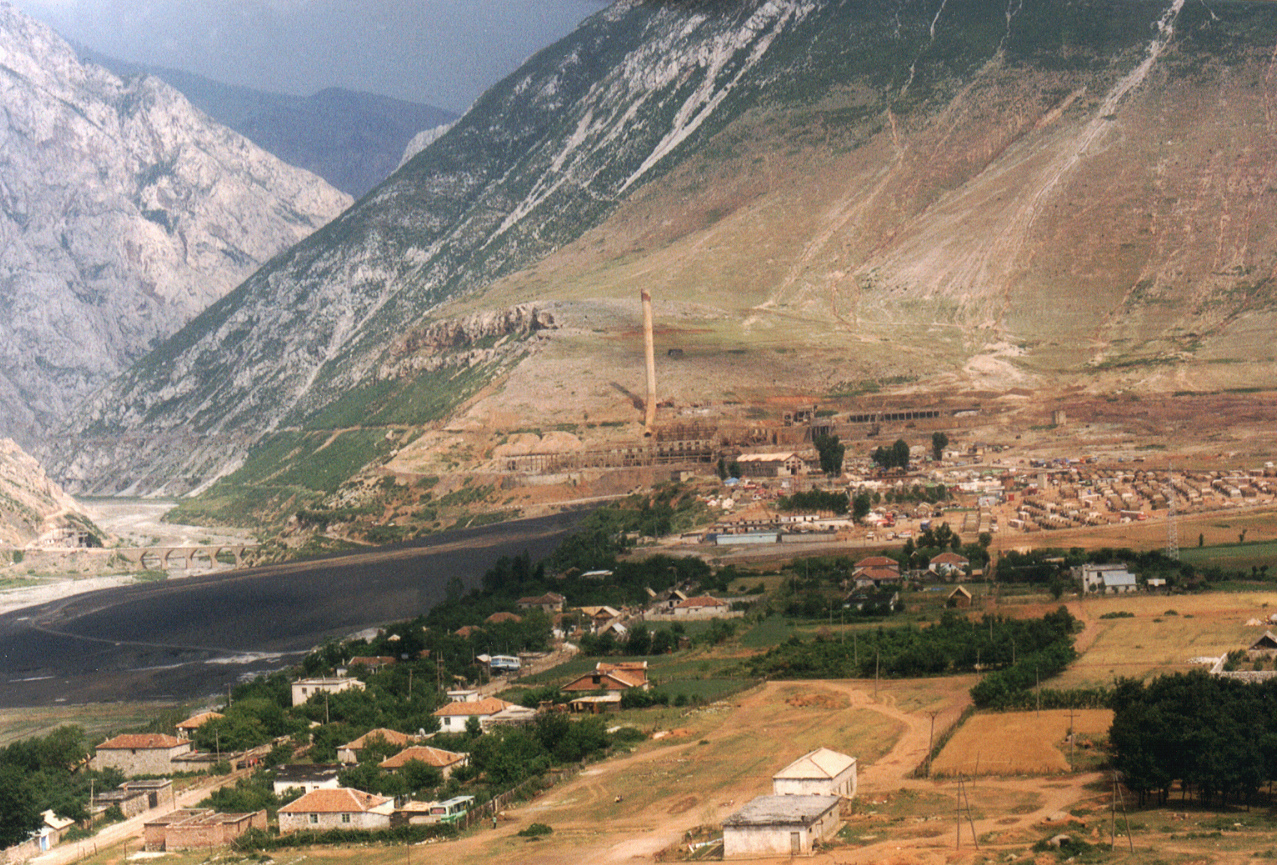
- Kosovo refugee camp in Kukës, Albania
- Date: 24 October 1998
- Meeting no.: 3,937
- Code: S/RES/1203 (Document)
- Subject: The situation in Kosovo
- Voting summary: 13 voted for; None voted against; 2 abstained
- Result: Adopted

Security Council composition
- Permanent members: China; France; Russia; United Kingdom; United States
- Non-permanent members: Bahrain; Brazil; Costa Rica; Gabon; Gambia; Japan; Kenya; Portugal; Slovenia; Sweden

United Nations Security Council resolution 1203, adopted on 24 October 1998, after recalling resolutions 1160 (1998) and 1199 (1998) on Kosovo, the Council demanded that the Federal Republic of Yugoslavia (Serbia and Montenegro) comply with previous Security Council resolutions and co-operate with the NATO and Organization for Security and Co-operation in Europe (OSCE) verification missions in Kosovo.

The resolution was triggered by the Gornje Obrinje massacre.

On 16 October 1998 an agreement was signed in Belgrade between the Federal Republic of Yugoslavia and the OSCE providing for the establishment of a verification mission in Kosovo, with aerial verifications over Kosovo agreed the previous day. The Secretary-General Kofi Annan was to send a mission to the Federal Republic of Yugoslavia to assess the situation on the ground in Kosovo.

The Security Council stated that the conflict in Kosovo should be resolved peacefully and that the territory be given greater autonomy and meaningful self-administration. Meanwhile, violence, terror and the supply of arms and training to terrorists in Kosovo in pursuit of political goals was condemned. There was concern that independent media outlets in the Federal Republic of Yugoslavia had been closed in addition to the impending humanitarian catastrophe in Kosovo.

Viewing the conflict as a threat to international peace and security and acting under Chapter VII of the United Nations Charter, the resolution demanded that FR Yugoslavia immediately and fully comply with the agreements with NATO and the OSCE. The Kosovo Albanian leadership also had to comply with the agreements and previous Security Council resolutions. Both parties were also urged to engage in dialogue to resolve the crisis and co-operate with international efforts to improve the humanitarian situation. The Kosovo-Albanians had to renounce terror and pursue their goals peacefully and it was reaffirmed that all refugees had the right to return home.

Finally, it was stated that any crimes committed against the population were to be investigated by the International Criminal Tribunal for the former Yugoslavia and international assistance to this end was requested.

Resolution 1203 was adopted by 13 votes to none against, with two abstentions from China and Russia who opposed the use of force. China was also against a resolution that would pressure the internal affairs of the Federal Republic of Yugoslavia and Russia stated that the resolution had not taken into account positive developments in Belgrade.

== See also ==
- Gornje Obrinje massacre
- Kosovo War
- List of United Nations Security Council Resolutions 1201 to 1300 (1998–2000)
- Yugoslav Wars
- List of United Nations Security Council Resolutions related to the conflicts in former Yugoslavia
