= Vučitrn massacre =

1999 mass execution in Vushtrri, Kosovo

- Native name: Masakra e Vushtrrisë
- Location: 42.8352°N 21.0226°E; Studime, Vučitrn, AP Kosovo, FR Yugoslavia (modern Kosovo)
- Date: 2–3 May 1999 (Central European Time)
- Target: Kosovo Albanians
- Attack type: Mass killing
- Deaths: 100–120
- Perpetrators: Serbian police and paramilitary forces
- Motive: Anti-Albanian sentiment, ethnic cleansing
- Accused: Vlastimir Đorđević, Serbian former police colonel general
- Verdict: Guilty
- Convictions: Crimes against humanity, including murder and deportation

The Vučitrn massacre (Albanian: Masakra e Vushtrrisë) was the mass killing of 100 to 120 Kosovo Albanian refugees during the Kosovo War on the 2nd and 3rd of May 1999 near Vučitrn, Kosovo.

== Background ==
A column of about 1,000 refugees were travelling in a convoy of about 100 tractors, who were fleeing fighting between the KLA and Serbian forces east of Vučitrn. Serbian Police and paramilitary forces caught up with the convoy that traveled south. On 2–3 May between Upper Studime and Lower Studime (Albanian: Studime e Epërme dhe Studime e Poshtme) near Vučitrn, Human Rights Watch estimated that around 100 men were killed by Serbian police and paramilitary forces.

ICTY investigator Romeu Ventura said that 120 civilians were murdered on 2 May by Serb forces and buried two days later in a mass grave five miles east of Vučitrn. After the war, ICTY forensic teams discovered 98 bodies in Upper Studime.

== Aftermath ==
The Vučitrn massacre was raised at the trial of Serbian police colonel general Vlastimir Đorđević. The indictment against Đorđević says that some 105 Kosovo Albanians were killed in the massacre near the village of Studime on 2 May 1999. Đorđević was sentenced to 27 years in prison, for his role in the murder of more than 700 ethnic Albanians in Kosovo in 1999. The UN tribunal at The Hague found him guilty of five counts of crimes against humanity, including murder and deportation.

== See also ==
- Operation Horseshoe
- War crimes in the Kosovo War
