= Daut Demaku =

- Born: October 13, 1944 (age 81); Abri e Epërme, Drenas, Kosovo

Daut Demaku is an Albanian writer and lecturer of the course "The Art of Positive Thinking".

== Biography ==
He was schooled in his hometown and in Pristina. He edited the student newspaper of Kosovo "Bota e Re" (New World) and was president of the League of Students of Kosovo.

A long time was editor of the editorial desk of Rilindja Magazine, editor of the book publishing Agricultural Cooperative in Pristina and finally the director of Rilindja Publishing House. His works are translated into English, Norwegian, Macedonian and Serbian.

== Works ==
- Brigjet e Thata – 1967
- Plisat e Kuq – 1969
- Plisat e Kuq – 1971
- Kapituj jete – 1977
- Shi e Puhi – 1979
- Buka – 1981
- Bletaja – 1976
- Në mjaltishtë – 1978
- Mote të thata – 1983
- Trëndafila pa gjëmba – 1986
- Guralec në këpucë – 1989
- Tregime Shqiptare – 1996
- Mendimi dhe Suksesi – 1997
- Magjia e Urtisë – 2000
- Shenjat para kthesave – 2002
- Thuaji jetes miremengjes – 2003
- Rina Dhe Gjyshi – 2004
- Aforizma – 2005
- Tregime Shqiptare dhe Mendimi Pozitiv – 2008
- Trenat e mesnatës – 1972
- Selgjishtja është dëshmitare – 1978
- Ndryshoe vehten o njeri – 2004
- Servisi i shpirtit – 1997
- Ulërima – 2004
- Tregime të sotme shqiptare – 1968
- Toka e përgjakur – 1972
- Djepi i lashtë – 1984
- Lumturia – 2016
