= Abri e Epërme =

Village in Drenas, Kosovo

- Village
- Interactive map of Abri e Epërme
- Coordinates: 42.63653°N 20.78487°E
- Country: Kosovo
- District: Pristina
- Municipality: Drenas
- Elevation: 740 m (2,430 ft)

Population (2024)
  - Total: 1,027
- Time zone: UTC+1 (CET)
  - Summer (DST): UTC+2 (CEST)

Abri e Epërme is a village in the municipality of Drenas, Kosovo. The village is home to 1,027 inhabitants and it's around 12 km (7.5 mi) away from Drenas.

== History ==
=== Kosovo War ===
During the Kosovo War, in the village a massacre took place. The Abri e Epërme Massacre refers to the killing of 35 civilian Kosovo Albanians, in a forest outside the village on 26th of September 1998 by Serbian Police Forces. Among the victims were women and children.

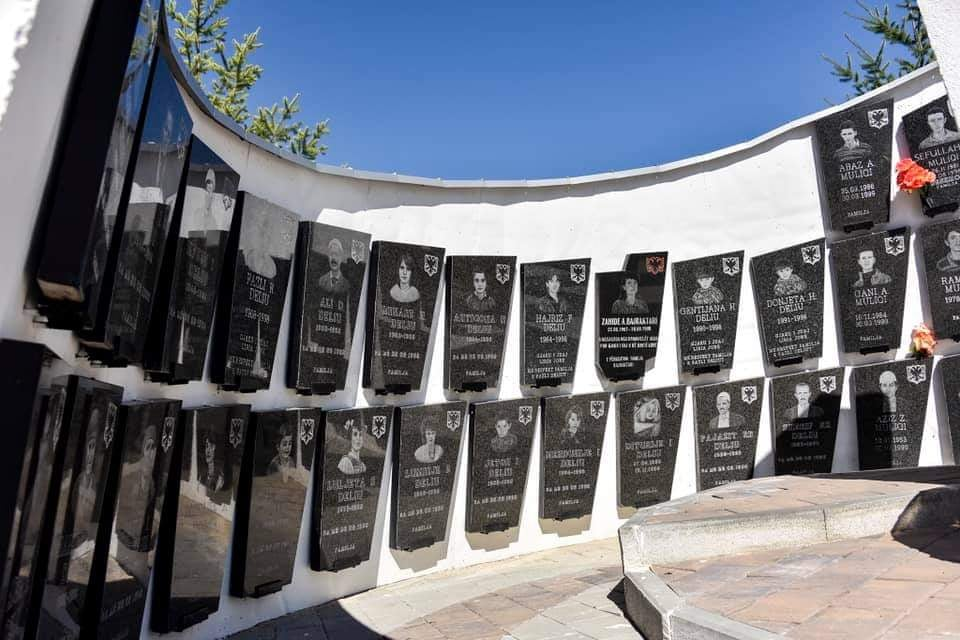
The monument dedicated to the victims of the massacre

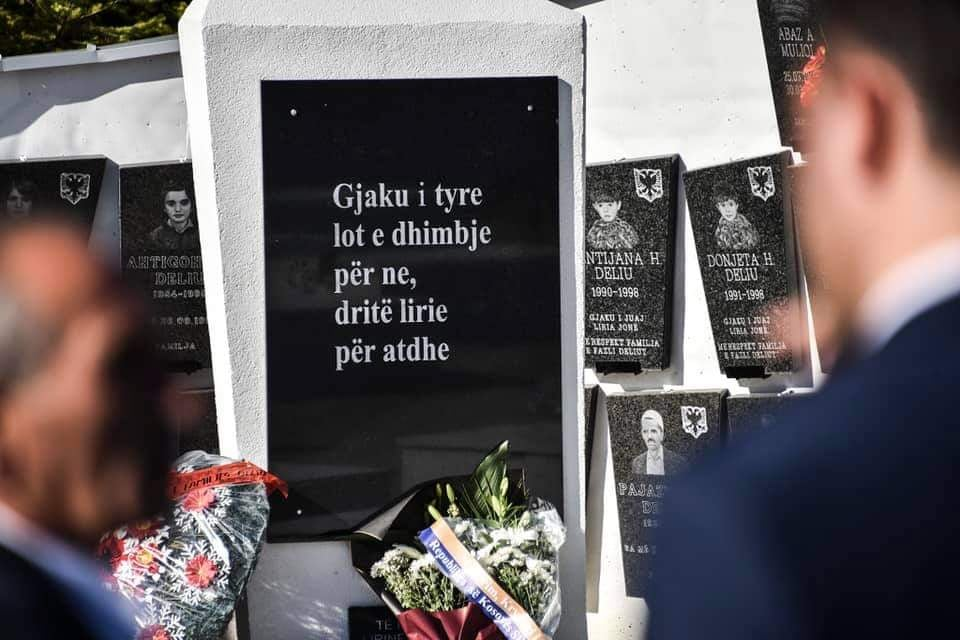
The inscription on the monument in Albanian: "Gjaku i tyre lot e dhimbje për ne, dritë lirie për atdhe" ("Their blood, tears, and pain for us; a light of freedom for the homeland").

== Notable people ==
- Daut Demaku, writer
