= Sreten Lukić =

Serbian general (born 1955)

Colonel General Sreten Lukić
- Сретен Лукић
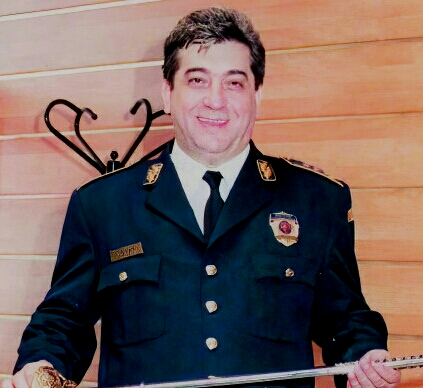
- Born: 28 March 1955 (age 71); Višegrad, PR Bosnia and Herzegovina, FPR Yugoslavia
- Military career
- Allegiance: Yugoslavia
- Branch: Ministry of Internal Affairs of Serbia; Armed Forces of Serbia and Montenegro
- Service years: until 2004
- Rank: Colonel general
- Conflicts: Kosovo War; Attack on Prekaz; Battle of Glođane; Battle of Belaćevac Mine; Battle of Junik; Battle of Podujevo; Yugoslav offensive in Kosovo (1998); Central Drenica offensive
- Awards

Sreten Lukić (Serbian: Сретен Лукић, born 28 March 1955) is a retired Serbian colonel general. He served as the head of the Serbian Police in Kosovo during the 1998–99 Kosovo War and subsequently as the Deputy Minister of Internal Affairs of Serbia from 2001 to 2004.

He was convicted in 2009 for war crimes committed by the Serbian Police forces in Kosovo.

== Career ==
From May 1998, Lukić was Head of the Serbian Ministry of Internal Affairs (MUP) Staff for Kosovo and Metohija and from June 1999 he was Assistant Chief of the Public Security Service (RJB) and the Chief of Border Administration of the Border Police in the MUP. He was appointed Assistant Minister and Chief of the RJB on 31 January 2001 and remained as Assistant Minister until sacked by the Prime Minister Vojislav Koštunica in March 2004.

== ICTY trial and sentence ==
He was indicted for crimes against humanity and violations of the customs of war by the International Criminal Tribunal for the former Yugoslavia (ICTY) with three other Serbian police and army generals, former chief of staff General Nebojša Pavković, former Army General Vladimir Lazarević and Police General Vlastimir Đorđević. The indictment charged the four with having “planned, instigated, ordered, committed or otherwise aided and abetted in a deliberate and widespread or systematic campaign of terror and violence directed at Kosovo Albanian civilians living in Kosovo”.

Lukić surrendered and was transferred to the ICTY on 4 April 2005. He pleaded not guilty to all counts. He eventually stood trial with Milan Milutinović, Nikola Šainović, Dragoljub Ojdanić, Pavković and Lazarević for crimes committed in the territory of Kosovo, beginning on or about 1 January 1999 and continuing until 20 June 1999. On 26 February 2009, Lukić was found guilty by the Trial Chamber of a number of charges and sentenced to 22 years of imprisonment. He was convicted of crimes including deportation, other inhumane acts (forcible transfer), murder, persecutions on political, racial or religious grounds (crimes against humanity) and murder (violations of the laws or customs of war).

Lukić was ruled to have had the intent to forcibly displace part of the Kosovo Albanian population, both within and outside of Kosovo, and thereby ensure continued control by the Former Republic of Yugoslavia (FRY) and Serbian authorities over the province: his participation in the "joint criminal enterprise" in Kosovo said to be responsible for committing crimes specified in the judgement in Peć, Dečani, Đakovica, Prizren, Orahovac, Suva Reka, Srbica, Kosovska Mitrovica, Vučitrn, Pristina, Gnjilane, Uroševac and Kačanik. Upon appeal, his sentence was reduced to 20 years on 23 January 2014. Lukić was released from prison in October 2021.
