= Izbica, Kosovo =

Izbica Избица Izbicë
- Village
- Location in Kosovo
- Coordinates: 42°43′41″N 20°39′24″E
- Country: Kosovo
- District: Mitrovica
- Municipality: Skenderaj

Population (2024)
  - Total: 2
- Time zone: UTC+1 (CET)
  - Summer (DST): UTC+2 (CEST)

Izbica (Albanian: Izbicë) is a village in Skenderaj, Kosovo.

== History ==
In March 1999 during the Kosovar war, the village was the site of a massacre of Kosovar Albanian civilians by Yugoslav forces.
