= Gani Geci =

Kosovan politician

Member of the Kosovo Assembly
- In office 2007–2010

Personal details
- Born: 1968 (age 57–58) Llaushë, Kosovo

Gani Geci (born 1968) is a Kosovar Albanian former politician and veteran of the Kosovo Liberation Army (UÇK).Geci was active in the Democratic League of Kosovo (LDK) youth wing in the 1990s and fought in the UÇK during the 1998–99 Kosovo War. After the war, he entered politics and was elected to the Assembly of Kosovo around the time of the 2008 declaration of independence. He signed the 2008 Kosovo Declaration of Independence as an Assembly member. Geci later served as a deputy (MP) in the Assembly for the Dardania Democratic League (LDD) faction of the LDK.

== Early life and education ==
Geci was born on January 20, 1968 in the village of Llaushë in the municipality of Skenderaj (then Kosovo, Yugoslavia). He earned a degree in law at the University of Pristina (Faculty of Law). In the late 1980s and 1990s he was active in the LDK youth organization, and in 1998 he became president of the LDK Youth Forum in Skenderaj. During this period he became close to LDK leader Ibrahim Rugova and later protected him. One report notes that during the war Geci’s family was targeted by other UÇK figures: his brother Esati was wounded on orders of Sabit Geci, a rival commander, in 1998.

== Kosovo War involvement ==
During the 1998–99 conflict with Serbian forces, Geci fought as a member of the UÇK in the Drenica region. His comrades described him as “one of our most active fighters” against the Serb occupation, noting that he was present at the battles around Prekaz during the final Serbian offensive. However, Geci was also the subject of an infamous wartime accusation. In 1998 the UÇK General Staff issued “Communiqué No. 59,” which accused a “collaborator with moustache” named Gani Geci (born in Llaushë) of killing Abedin Rexha and leading Serbian police to civilian massacres. This claim was vehemently denied by other UÇK commanders, who labeled the allegations “fabrications” intended to smear Geci. They emphasized that Geci had fought throughout all offensives and had never collaborated with Serbian forces. In effect, the Communiqué 59 charge against Geci was widely regarded as false and politically motivated.

== Political career ==
After the war, Geci joined Kosovo’s new political institutions. He became a member of the Assembly of Kosovo as part of the LDK–LDD faction. In February 2008, when the Assembly declared Kosovo’s independence, Geci was one of the 109 deputies who adopted and signed the Declaration of Independence. Contemporary press referred to him as a “former deputy” (member of parliament) of the LDK and later LDD. He was generally aligned with the Rugova faction of the LDK and later with the breakaway Dardania party.

== Legal issues and controversies ==
In the years following independence, Geci became embroiled in several violent incidents and legal cases. The most serious was his involvement in a fatal shooting in Skenderaj. On 4 August 2014, in a café in downtown Skenderaj, Geci shot and killed Ruzhdi Shaqiri, a fellow former UÇK fighter and local businessman. The killing was widely reported as premeditated and motivated by a personal conflict. Geci was arrested and charged with murder. In June 2016, the Basic Court in Mitrovica convicted Geci of aggravated murder and illegal weapons possession, sentencing him to 4½ years in prison. Geci pleaded self-defense, claiming Shaqiri threatened him and that he acted to save his own life. On appeal, the case was remanded for retrial, and in 2021 the Mitrovica court again found him guilty. On 4 June 2021 the court gave Geci a combined sentence of 3 years and 6 months imprisonment for the killing. (Time already served in custody was credited toward this sentence.) These events have been extensively covered by Kosovar media.

Geci was also involved in a 2013 shooting incident with a prominent politician. After a rival party rally in Skenderaj on 28 October 2013, Geci allegedly drew a handgun and fired at PDK MP Azem Syla, himself a former UÇK commander. Multiple shots were reported. Police statements suggested that Geci (accompanied by family members) fired one shot into the air during a scuffle, with no one injured. Footage aired by local media showed gunshots and panic at the scene, and Geci later admitted firing shots but claimed it was with a blank or pellet pistol as a warning. Both Geci and his relatives denied injuring anyone and insisted the confrontation had been brief. No one was ultimately charged with serious injury; the episode remains a noted controversy from that period.

As Kosovo has grappled with alleged UÇK war crimes, Geci has become a vocal figure around the war-crimes court (the Kosovo Specialist Chambers in The Hague). In 2018 he publicly announced that he had been invited by the Specialist Prosecutors for questioning. He stated that he would comply without a lawyer and would “defend the war for freedom” in The Hague. Geci said he intended to expose those who had “killed political opponents” during or after the war; he specifically vowed not to protect individuals behind the old Communiqué 59 allegations, saying they would be “unmasked” by his testimony.

In November 2018 Geci confirmed that there are five murders for which he will testify at the Special Court in The Hague.

Following his brother Fadil Geci’s testimony at the Hague tribunal in the trial against former KLA leaders, including Hashim Thaçi, Gani Geci publicly condemned the appearance of defamatory graffiti in Pristina targeting his brother. Geci criticized those he believes are behind the graffiti, alleging connections to pro-Thaçi circles, and reiterated his willingness to testify himself at the Hague. He further claimed that statements by Hashim Thaçi’s brother, Gani Thaçi, contributed to the events leading to the killing of the Jashari family.

In 2026 after the conviction of Thaçi, Veseli, Krasniqi and Selimi, Geci was involved in an incident where he allegedly threatened and stalked journalist Lirim Mehmetaj, who posted on Facebook criticizing the LVV MP, Fatos Geci. He was sentenced to 30 days of pre-trial detention on the 14 October but was released on the 23 October after the basic court approved a request to terminate his detention.

== Public image and media ==
Gani Geci has maintained an active social media presence (Facebook, TikTok, Instagram) where he frequently shares memories of the Kosovo War and comments on current politics. He has given numerous interviews to Kosovo news outlets, often speaking about his wartime experiences and legal battles. For example, his 2013 conflict with Azem Syla was broadcast on Klan Kosova television. His statements about the Specialist Chambers have been reported by Telegrafi and Insajderi.
