= Kadri Veseli =

Kosovar politician

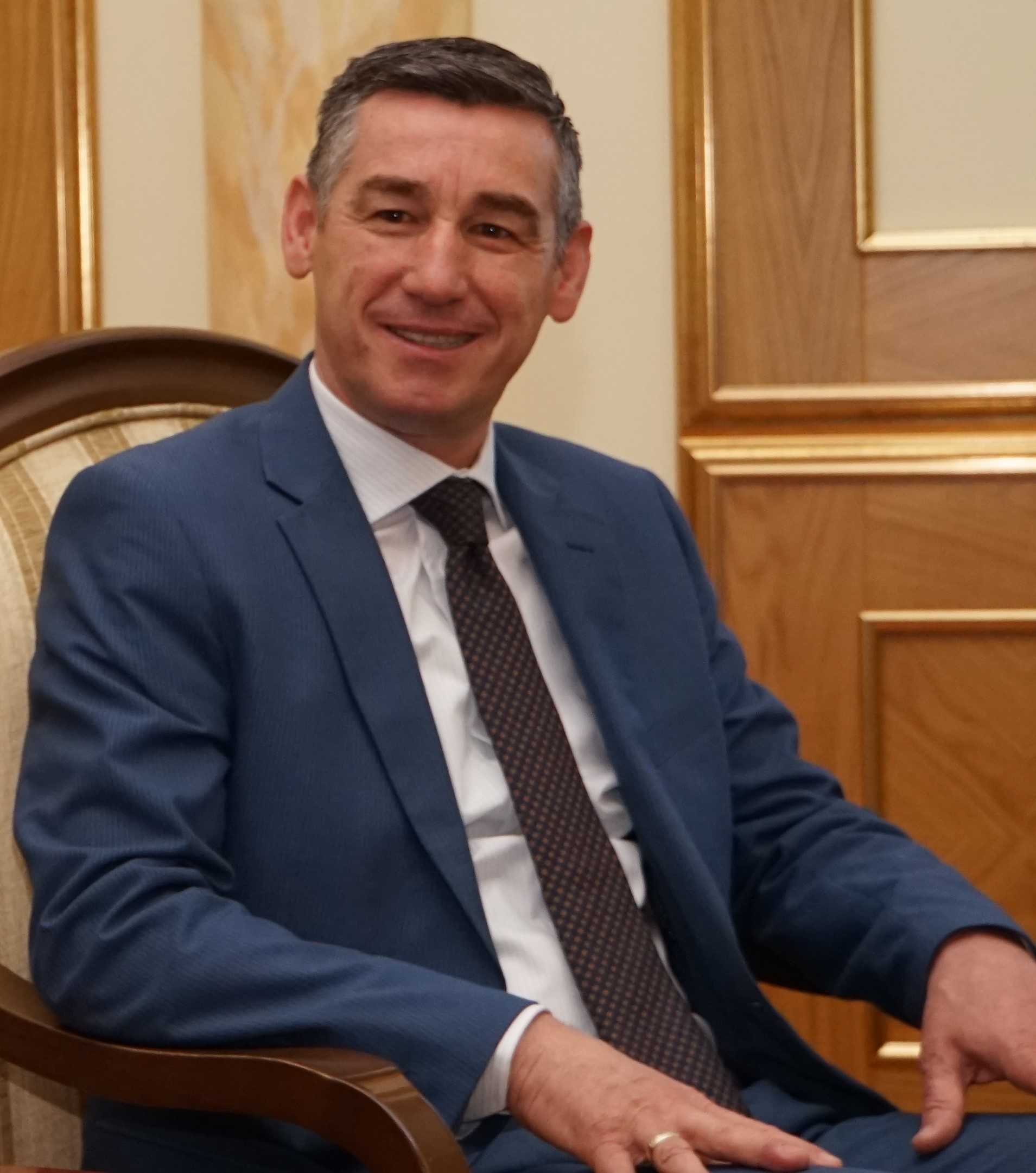
- Veseli in May 2017

Leader of the Opposition
- In office 3 February 2020 – 3 June 2020
- Preceded by: Albin Kurti
- Succeeded by: Albin Kurti

Leader of the Democratic Party of Kosovo
- In office 9 March 2016 – 5 November 2020
- Preceded by: Hashim Thaçi
- Succeeded by: Enver Hoxhaj (Acting)

Chairman of the Assembly of Kosovo
- In office 8 December 2014 – 22 August 2019
- Preceded by: Jakup Krasniqi
- Succeeded by: Glauk Konjufca

Personal details
- Born: 31 May 1967 (age 59) Braboniq, SR Serbia, SFR Yugoslavia (now Kosovo)
- Party: Democratic Party of Kosovo
- Spouse: Violeta Veseli
- Children: 4
- Occupation: Politician, jurist
- Known for: Founder and Leader of the Kosovo Liberation Army, Chairman of the Assembly of Kosovo and leader of Democratic Party of Kosovo
- Nickname: "Luli" (nom de guerre)

Military service
- Battles/wars: Battle of Llapushnik
- Allegiance: Kosovo Liberation Army

Kadri Veseli (born 31 May 1967) is a Kosovo Albanian politician, former chairman of the Assembly of Kosovo and the Kosovo Intelligence Service. He is the leader of the Democratic Party of Kosovo. Veseli was one of the founders and leaders of the Kosovo Liberation Army. He also was the chief of the Kosovo Intelligence Service, a post-war state intelligence organisation. In 2026, he was found guilty of war crimes during the Kosovo War by the Kosovo Specialist Chambers and sentenced to 18 years in prison.

== Education and personal life ==
Veseli began his higher education studies in 1990 at the University of Pristina, in the faculty of Agriculture, and at the Higher Pedagogical School in the Albanian Language and Literature Department. Due to political circumstances, he was forced to complete the remainder of his studies in Albania. He has a bachelor's degree from the Agricultural University of Tirana, Albania, and an MBA in General Management from Sheffield University's international faculty in Thessaloniki, Greece. Veseli was a PhD candidate in the University of Ljubljana in Slovenia.

Veseli speaks English, German and Albanian. He has four children with his wife, Violeta.

== Career ==
Veseli was one of the leaders of the Kosovar student movement during 1988–1990, which fought for humanitarian and political rights for Kosovan Albanians, including the right for independence.

During the Kosovo War, he was appointed commander of the Counter Intelligence Service (G-2) of the KLA. He was present in the Battle of Llapushnik as a commander. Veseli remained the leader of the organisation as it transformed into Kosovo Intelligence Service (SHIK), a post-war intelligence organisation, until its disbandment in 2008.

At the end of 2012, Veseli formally joined the Democratic Party of Kosovo (PDK), and on January 27, 2013 he became the deputy head of the party. Veseli was voted Chairman of the Assembly of the Republic of Kosovo on 8 December 2014.

In May 2016, following the resignation of Hashim Thaçi to become President of the Republic, Veseli became President of the PDK by popular vote. He was elected with no votes against and no abstentions.

Following the 2017 Kosovan parliamentary election, PDK joined the PANA coalition that won a majority of parliamentary seats with 245,627 votes (33.74%). Veseli won the most votes of any coalition candidate, with 129,947 votes. Following those results, Veseli was re-elected as Chairman of the Assembly on 7 September 2017.

In the October 6th 2019 election, Veseli was the PDK's nominee for the prime ministership of Kosovo. His party took the third place with 178,637 votes (21.23%), with Veseli winning 145,881 votes.

== War crimes trial ==
On 24 June 2020, the Kosovo Specialist Chambers and Specialist Prosecutor's Office located in The Hague filed a ten-count indictment for the court's consideration. The indictment charged Veseli, Hashim Thaçi, Rexhep Selimi and Jakup Krasniqi for crimes against humanity and war crimes, including murder, enforced disappearance of persons, persecution, and torture, allegedly occurring during the 1998-99 Kosovo War. The defendants were charged with approximately 100 murders of Kosovo Albanians, Serbs, Roma, and political opponents. According to the press release, the Specialist Prosecutor stated that it was necessary to make the issue public due to repeated efforts by Thaçi and Veseli to obstruct and undermine the work of the Kosovo Specialist Chambers.

Veseli voluntarily surrendered to the tribunal after he was charged, claiming that he saw the trial as "an opportunity to finally answer the false allegations and rumours that have been circulating for many years". He pleaded not guilty on 10 November 2020. The trial of the four defendants, expected to last for several years, began in April 2023.

On 16 September 2026, Thaci, Krasniqi, Selimi and Veseli were found guilty of war crimes that included murder, torture, cruel treatment and arbitrary detention, and sentenced to prison. Veseli received 18 years.
