= Gornje Obrinje massacre =

1998 mass execution of 35 Kosovo Albanians

Coordinates: 42°38′N 20°45′E

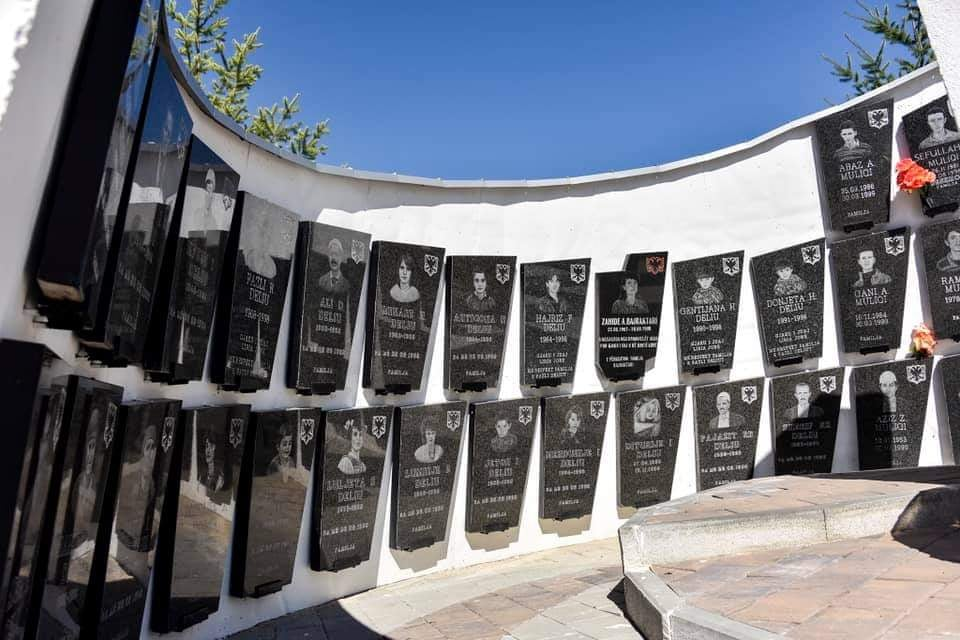
- The monument dedicated to the victims of the massacre
- Location: Gornje Obrinje, FR Yugoslavia (now Abri e Epërme, Kosovo)
- Date: 26 September 1998; 28 years ago
- Target: Albanians
- Attack type: Mass killing
- Deaths: 35, including 5 children
- Perpetrator: Serbian police
- Motive: Anti-Albanian sentiment, ethnic cleansing
- Convicted: None

The Gornje Obrinje Massacre (Albanian: Masakra në Abri të Epërme, Serbian: Masakr u Gornjem Obrinju) refers to the killing of 35 civilian Kosovo Albanians, in a forest outside the village of Abri e Epërme on 26 September 1998 by Serbian Police Forces during the Kosovo War. Among the victims were women and children.

== History ==
The Yugoslav Army had been deployed in the area for several months in a major offensive against the Kosovo Liberation Army (KLA), which had assumed loose control of an estimated one-third of the province. There was serious combat in the areas of Suva Reka and Drenica. At least 14 policemen had been killed by the KLA earlier that month. On 25 September, a Serbian police vehicle was blown up by a detonation on the road between Likoc and Abri e Epërme, with five police members dead.

According to Human Rights Watch, the Serbian special police retaliated by killing 21 civilians, belonging to the family of Deliaj from Abri e Epërme, on 26 September. Among these were 9 women and 5 children. They had been executed in a nearby forest. Later that same day, 14 men were randomly selected some kilometres from Abri e Epërme, abused for several hours, then eventually 13 were executed in Golubovac. On 27 September, Human Rights Watch researchers and journalists arrived at the village and documented the massacre, garnering major Western media coverage.

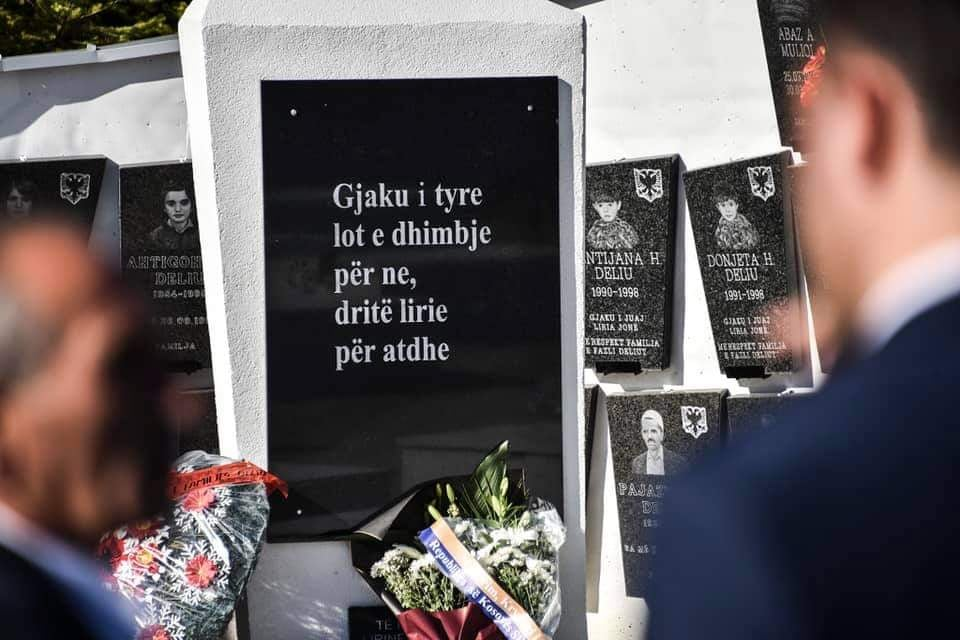
The inscription on the monument in Albanian: "Gjaku i tyre lot e dhimbje për ne, dritë lirie për atdhe" ("Their blood tears and pain for us; a light of freedom for the homeland").

International political pressure on the FR Yugoslav Government to end its perceptions in Kosovo was accelerated by the news of these killings, leading to a new resolution issued by the United Nations Security Council on 24 October 1998, calling for the deployment of the Diplomatic Verification Mission and an end to hostilities.

=== Forensic investigations ===
In October 1998, a Finnish forensic team supported by the European Union was granted permission by Yugoslav authorities and local Kosovo courts to exhume bodies from six sites in Kosovo: Gornje Obrinje, Rahovac, Golubovac, Glodjane, Klečka, and Volujak. The first three sites contained the remains of victims of actions by Serbian and Yugoslav forces, while the latter three were believed to contain victims of alleged crimes attributed to the KLA.

The team conducted investigations at Klečka and Volujak, both associated with alleged KLA abuses. However, on 10 December 1998, the team was prevented from reaching Gornje Obrinje, where reports documented the killing of members of the Albanian family in September. The team was blocked by a convoy of Serbian police. Approximately ten armored personnel carriers, staffed by heavily armed police, insisted on accompanying the forensic team to the site, which was located in an area partly under KLA control.

Serbian police further required that the team be accompanied by a Serbian court official and members of a Belgrade-based forensic team, and refused to allow access without a police escort. The forensic team opposed these conditions, citing concerns that such an escort could provoke confrontation with KLA forces. During negotiations, a plainclothes Serbian policeman opened the doors of a diplomatic vehicle belonging to Finnish ambassador Timothy Lahelma, removed a camera, and took its film, in what participants described as a violation of diplomatic immunity. Members of the forensic team also reported that Serbian police positioned their armored vehicles behind those of the European Union’s Kosovo Diplomatic Observer Mission (KDOM), allegedly to shelter them form potential KLA attacks.

Anticipating a possible confrontation between Serbian forces and the KLA, the Finnish forensic team ultimately abandoned its attempt to reach Gornje Obrinje.

On December 11, Human Rights Watch (HRW) strongly condemned the Serbian interference and urged the international community to ensure that both the Finnish forensic team and ICTY investigators were granted full and unimpeded access throughout Kosovo. HRW spokesperson John Cartner stated that: “The Yugoslav authorities are deeply implicated in war crimes in Kosovo and cannot be allowed to dictate the circumstances under which investigations take place.”

== See also ==
- War crimes in the Kosovo War
- List of massacres in the Kosovo War

== Sources ==
- Krieger, Heike (2001). The Kosovo Conflict and International Law: An Analytical Documentation 1974-1999. Cambridge University Press. ISBN 9780521800716.
- Bahador, B. (2007). The CNN Effect in Action: How the News Media Pushed the West toward War in Kosovo. Palgrave Macmillan US. pp. 83–84. ISBN 978-0-230-60422-3.
- HRW (1998). "Eighteen Civilians Massacred in Kosovo Forest". HRW.
- Peter Bouckaert; Fred Abrahams; Human Rights Watch (Organization) (1999). Federal Republic of Yugoslavia: A Week of Terror in Drenica : Humanitarian Law Violations in Kosovo. Human Rights Watch. pp. 20–. ISBN 978-1-56432-227-2.
- "Da znamo: Gornje Obrinje, 26. septembar 1998". HLC-RDC.
