= Izbica massacre =

1999 massacre during the Kosovo War

- Part of the Drenica massacres
- Bodies of Albanians recorded through a VHS camera in Izbica, March 1999.
- Location: 42°43′41″N 20°39′24″E; Izbica, Kosovo, Yugoslavia
- Date: March 28, 1999 around 12:00 (Central European Time)
- Target: Kosovar Albanians
- Attack type: Mass murder
- Deaths: 93–147
- Perpetrators: Serbian policemen and Yugoslav paramilitaries
- Motive: Anti-Albanian sentiment

The Izbica massacre (Albanian: Masakra e Izbicës; Serbian: Pokolj u Izbici) was one of the largest massacres of the Kosovo War. Following the war, the International Criminal Tribunal for the former Yugoslavia (ICTY) found that the massacre resulted in the deaths of at least 93 Kosovar Albanians, mostly male non-combatant civilians between the ages of 60 and 70.

== Background ==
During the Kosovo War, Izbica was considered safe for Kosovar Albanians from neighboring areas to take refuge, partly because of the Kosovo Liberation Army's presence. By 27 March, thousands of Kosovar Albanians from the Drenica region had gathered in Izbica. Most civilians had come after NATO had started its bombing campaign, when Yugoslav government forces began to shell the surrounding area. On 20 March a Yugoslav offensive took place in the Drenica region. The Yugoslav and Serbian forces had shelled many villages in Drenica, which resulted many villagers to flee to Çirez, which was later captured by Government forces. After Çirez had been captured, Serbian forces moved onto other places in Drenica, including Izbica, which they also had captured. By 31 March, the Yugoslav forces withdrew from Drenica after the KLA successfully retained its presence in Drenica.

== Killings ==
The shelling of the village of Izbica began during the night of 27 March when a group of at least fifty Yugoslav soldiers, policemen and paramilitaries entered the village. They wore both camouflage and dark blue or black uniforms, and carried long knives. Some wore ski masks and others had their faces blackened with greasepaint.

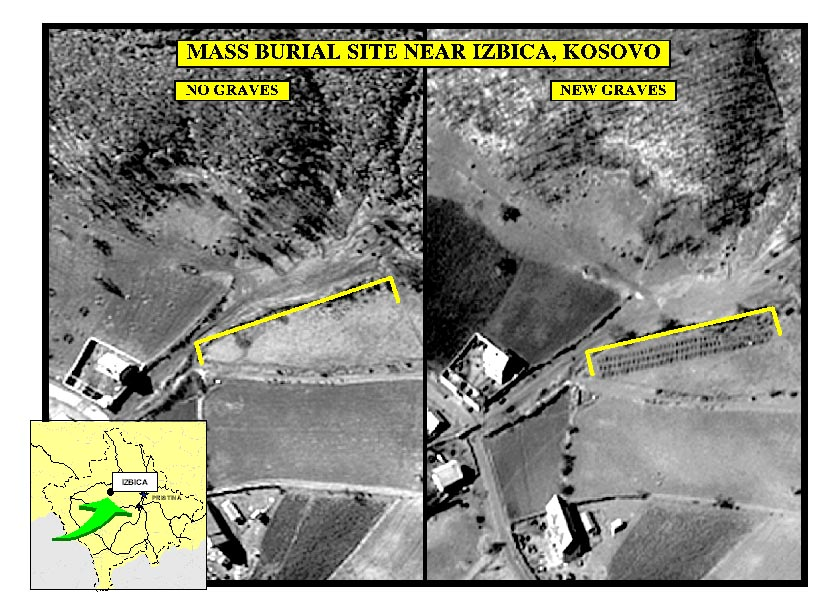
Satellite imagery of new mass burial site near Izbica.

On 28 March, nearly all of the adult men fled to the mountains, leaving mostly women, children, and old men in the village. In the field of Izbica, thousands of people were crowded that day, almost all women, children, and old people. Only about 150 men were among them. National security forces threatened to kill the villagers and demanded money. After they got the money, they separated the men from the women and children. Women and children were sent to Albania. The men were then executed with automatic weapons. Some women and old men were also executed.

== War crime trials ==
The Izbica killings were cited in the International Criminal Tribunal for the Former Yugoslavia (ICTY) indictment of Slobodan Milošević, and others.

On, or about, 27 March 1999, FRY and Republic of Serbia forces attacked the village of Izbica. Several thousand village residents took refuge in a meadow outside the village. On, or about, 28 March 1999, forces of the FRY and Serbia surrounded the villagers and then approached them, demanding money. After valuables were stolen by the soldiers and policemen, the men were separated from the women and small children. The men were then further divided into two groups, one of which was sent to a nearby hill, and the other of which was sent to a nearby streambed. Both groups of men were then fired upon by the forces of the FRY and Serbia, and approximately 130 Kosovo Albanian men were killed.

— Indictment against Milošević and others

According to Sadik Xhemajli, a KLA fighter from Izbica who recorded the names of victims, 142 Kosovar Albanians from the village were killed between 28 March and 10 May 1999. Other KLA members that witnessed and documented the atrocities shared consistent figures between 144 and 147. In 2009, the ICTY ruled that at least 93 people were killed on 28 March, mostly male civilians between the ages of 60 and 70.

== See also ==
- List of massacres in Yugoslavia
- Drenica massacres
- War crimes in the Kosovo War
- Violence against men

== Bibliography ==
- Schuppli, Susan (2020). MATERIAL WITNESS: Media, Forensics, Evidence. MIT Press. ISBN 978-0262043571.
