= Arllat =

Arllat: Arllat (Albanian); Орлате/Orlate (Serbian)
- Village
- Interactive map of Arllat
- Coordinates: 42.545232°N 20.832879°E
- Location: Kosovo
- District: Prishtinë
- Municipality: Drenas

Population (2024)
  - Total: 2,348
- Time zone: UTC+1 (Central European Time)
  - Summer (DST): UTC+2 (CEST)
- Postal code: 329/138

Arllat is a village located in the municipality of Drenas in Kosovo.

== Demographics ==
According to the 2011 census, Arllat had a population of 3,134 residents. However, the census of 2024 showed that the village has a population of 2,348. The vast majority of the population identifies as ethnic Albanian.

== History ==
Arllat was noted in an Ottoman defter of 1485 as a large village, consisting of 43 homes. On top of a plateau overlooking the village, there existed a Serbian Orthodox monastery purportedly built with the same materials used to build the Visoki Dečani monastery. The monastery was abandoned during the Great Migrations of the Serbs in 1690. The monastery lay abandoned until 1885 when local Albanians deconstructed the monastery and used the remnants to build a mosque in Arllat.

According to refugees, buildings in this small village located on the crossroads between Pristina, Peja, and Malisheva were set on fire by Serbian forces on March 30 after some 200 ethnic Albanian men had been executed.

== Notable people ==
Eliot Bujupi is a footballer from Arllat who has gained recognition for his performances both in Kosovo and abroad. Born in the village, Bujupi has been praised as a rising star. In August 2024, he was called up for the Kosovo national team and made his debut shortly after.
