= Central Drenica offensive =

Offensive during the Kosovo War in 1998

- Part of the Kosovo War and the Drenica massacres
Date	22–26 September 1998
Location	Central Drenica, AP Kosovo, FR Yugoslavia (present day Kosovo)
Result	Yugoslav victory: Yugoslav forces capture at least six villages, including the KLA strongholds of Gornje and Donje Obrinje; Yugoslav forces massacre 35 Albanian civilians in Gornje Obrinje as retaliation; Yugoslav troops withdraw from Likovac and the Obrinje villages due to international pressure

Belligerents
(Federal Republic of Yugoslavia) FR Yugoslavia	Kosovo Liberation Army

Commanders and leaders
(Federal Republic of Yugoslavia) Slobodan Milosevic (Federal Republic of Yugoslavia) Vlastimir Đorđević (Federal Republic of Yugoslavia) Sreten Lukić (Federal Republic of Yugoslavia) Nebojša Pavković (Federal Republic of Yugoslavia) Stojan Konjikovac (Federal Republic of Yugoslavia) Franko Simatović	Mujë Krasniqi; Fehmi Lladrovci †; Sylejman Selimi; Ilaz Kodra; Hamit Lladrovci †; Abedin Rexha; Skënder Skënderi

Units involved
(Federal Republic of Yugoslavia) Yugoslav Army (Federal Republic of Yugoslavia) Yugoslav Police; Special Operations Unit; Special Anti-Terrorist Unit	114th Brigade; 113th Brigade; 112th Brigade; 111th “Adem Jashari” Brigade

Strength
(Federal Republic of Yugoslavia) unknown	unknown

Casualties and losses
(Federal Republic of Yugoslavia) 14 killed (Federal Republic of Yugoslavia) 3 tanks destroyed (Federal Republic of Yugoslavia) 1 armored vehicle destroyed	28 killed
- (Albania) 35 Kosovar-Albanian civilians killed (Albania) 20,000 displaced

The Central Drenica offensive was an offensive undertaken by the Yugoslav army against the Kosovo Liberation Army in the villages of Likovac, Gornje Obrinje, Glanasela and other villages in the central area of the Drenica region. The offensive lasted between 22 and 26 September 1998.

== Background ==
During the Yugoslav September Offensive, Yugoslav forces succeeded in destroying the strongholds of the KLA in several towns or villages. The offensive was labeled as a success however the offensive still remained unfinished in one region; Central Drenica. By 13 September, the Yugoslav forces had captured the village of Likovac, and began preparations for a large-scale offensive in the region. On 19 September, the KLA attacked a police station in Drenica that left at least seven Serb policemen dead, which resulted in an offensive in the Drenica region that was launched on 21 September.

== Offensive ==
On 21 September, Yugoslav forces began reorganizing their troops for an offensive in Central Drenica as well as backing them up with tanks and armored vehicles. Upon seeing this, the KLA divided their forces in the region into three positions. The second position located in the village of Glanasela commanded by general Fehmi Lladrovci was the first to be attacked by the Yugoslav forces on 22 September, with the assault on the village lasting for eight hours. During the fighting, the Yugoslav troops attempted to reorganize on the nearby road, leading to the KLA firing at their tanks with anti-tank weapons, destroying three tanks. The Yugoslav forces quickly began attacking the KLA from behind, utilizing armored vehicles to fire at the KLA, killing general Fehmi Lladrovci. Upon seeing this the remaining KLA soldiers fled, besides Fehmi Lladrovci's wife, Xhevë Lladrovci who stayed in Glanasela, resisting the Yugoslav troops being killed. After the fall of the second defensive position and the death of Fehmi Lladrovci the KLA forces in the area came under the command of Mujë Krasniqi and Sylejman Selimi.

The KLA forces continued resisting the Yugoslav troops inflicting many casualties by using hit-and-run tactics, attacking Yugoslav forces before retreating to the nearby villages. During the fighting, on 25 September an anti-tank mine placed by the KLA was detonated on the Likovac-Gornje Obrinje road by a Yugoslav police armored vehicle resulting in the death of five officers and the destruction of the armored vehicle. The fighting lasted up until 26 September.

=== Gornje Obrinje massacre ===
Due to the mine attack on the Likovac-Gornje Obrinje road and not being able to penetrate the KLA positions, the Yugoslav forces killed 21 civilians of the Deliaj family from Donje Obrinje on 26 September in a nearby forest. Among the 21 killed, 9 were women and 5 were children. The same day the Yugoslav police tortured another 14 Albanian civilians and eventually executed 13 of them. The next day on the 27th HRW journalists arrived to the area and documented the massacre, leading to the event garnering Western attention.

== Casualties ==
=== KLA casualties ===
During the offensive, the KLA suffered 28 deaths, including general Fehmi Lladrovci, and his wife, Xhevë Lladrovci. Some time after the initial fighting on 22 September, a group of seven militants were able to reach Glanasela and retrieve the bodies of the fallen soldiers.

=== Yugoslav casualties ===
According to author Dag Henriksen, the Yugoslav forces suffered 14 deaths during the offensive, while PBS, despite not giving an exact number, placed the casualties on the Yugoslav side at "more than a dozen". According to KLA commander Naim Maloku, during an interview with New York Times, said that the Yugoslav army faced resistance from the KLA in Likovac-Obrinje area, saying that 47 Yugoslav soldiers and policemen were killed. During the mine attack on 25 September an armored vehicle was also destroyed. According to Albanian media, the KLA were also able to destroy three Yugoslav tanks.

=== Civilian casualties ===
According to the Human Rights Watch (HRW) 35 civilians were killed including women and children in Gornje Obrinje. 21 of the victims were members of the Deliaj family including a 5-month old baby.

== Aftermath ==
On 15 October the NATO Kosovo Verification Mission (KVM) Ceasefire agreement was signed, with the deadline for withdrawal being extended to 27 October. Due to clashes between Yugoslav troops and KLA militants, several difficulties emerged while implementing the agreement. The Yugoslav withdrawal commenced around 25 October 1998, and Operation Eagle Eye began on 30 October.
