= Poklek, Kosovo =

Village in Drenas, Kosovo

Poklek
- Village
- Location within Kosovo
- Coordinates: 42.624°N 20.913°E
- Country: Kosovo
- District: Pristina
- Municipality: Drenas

Population (2024)
  - Total: 1,875
- Time zone: UTC+1 (CET)
  - Summer (DST): UTC+2 (CEST)

Poklek is a village in the municipality of Drenas, Kosovo. The village, as of 2024, has a population of 1,875 inhabitants and is located around 3 kilometres (1.9 mi) away from Drenas.

== History ==
During the Kosovo War, the village was the site of the Poklek massacre where 53 Albanian civilians, of whom 24 children, were killed by the Serbian paramilitary forces.
