= Drenica massacres =

Mass killings in Kosovo

- Part of the war crimes in the Kosovo War
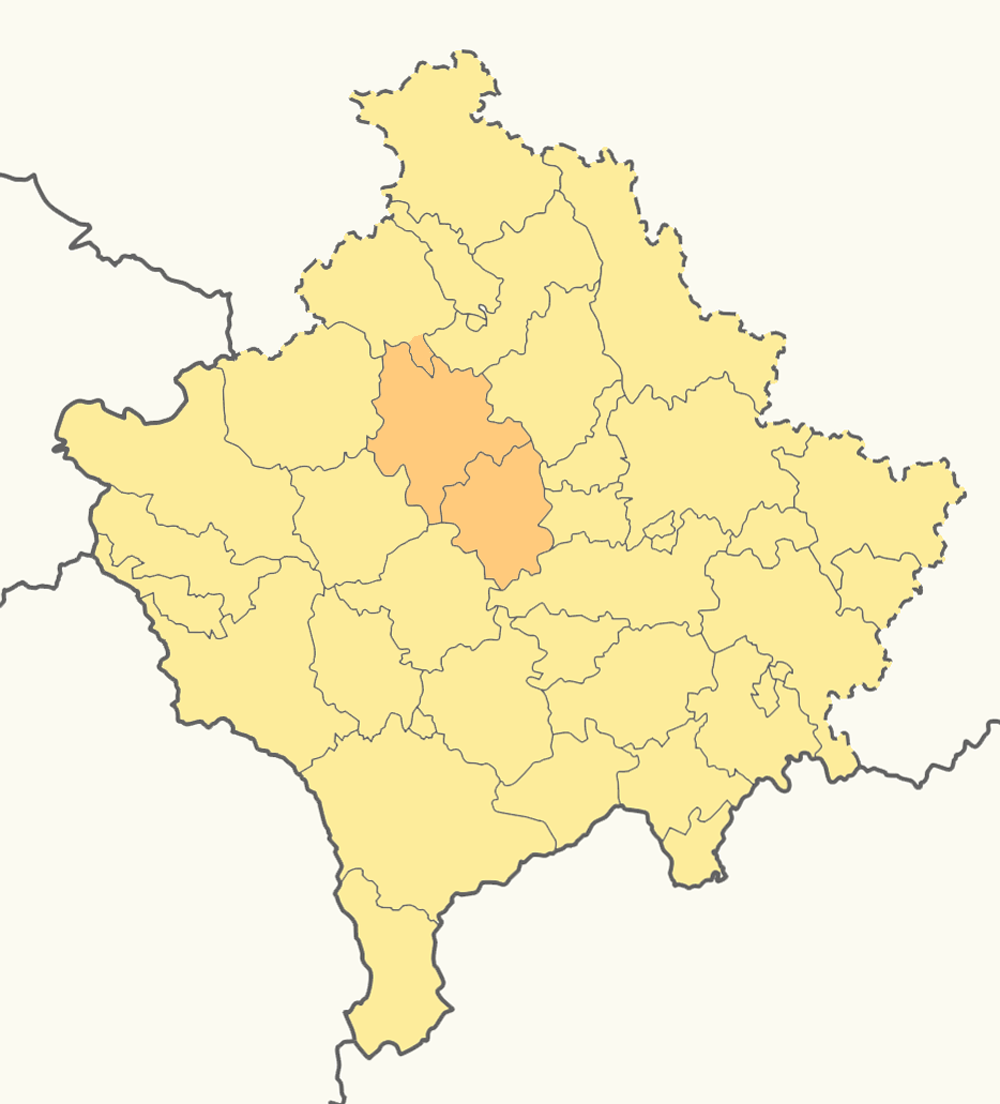
- Municipalities of Glogovac and Srbica in Drenica region in central Kosovo.
- Location: 42.4143°N 20.545°E; Drenica, Kosovo, FR Yugoslavia
- Date: February 1998 – June 1999
- Target: Kosovo Albanians
- Attack type: Mass murder, ethnic cleansing, summary executions
- Deaths: Several hundred
- Perpetrator: FR Yugoslavia security forces

The Drenica massacres (Albanian: Masakrat në Drenicë; Serbian: Масакри у Дреници, Masakri u Drenici) were a series of killings of Kosovo Albanian civilians committed by Serbian special police forces^{[a]} in the Drenica region of central Kosovo.

According to Human Rights Watch, abuses in the Drenica region during the Kosovo War 1998–1999 "were so widespread that a comprehensive description is beyond the scope of this report". Key atrocities took place in the period of February – March 1998 in the Çirez, Likoshan, and Prekaz and during the NATO bombing of Yugoslavia, from March to June 1999 in the villages of Izbica, Rezalla, Poklek and Çikatovë e Vjetër.

== Background ==
Drenica is a hilly region in central Kosovo inhabited almost exclusively by ethnic Albanians. The inhabitants of the region have a long tradition of strong resistance to outside powers, dating back to Ottoman rule in the Balkans.

The villages of the Drenica region were the birthplace of the Kosovo Liberation Army (KLA), which began armed operations in Drenica in 1996. Following a battle in Rezallë near Skenderaj in 1997, the KLA gained control over the region and it became their stronghold until the end of the war. By 1997, Kosovo Albanians had begun to refer to Drenica as "liberated territory" because of the KLA's presence.

== Massacres in 1998 ==
In January 1998, Serbian special police began operations that raided villages in Drenica linked to the KLA. Between February 28 and March 5, police launched multiple military-style attacks on the villages of Çirez, Likoshan and Prekaz, using armored vehicles and helicopters. Although the KLA engaged in combat during these attacks, government forces fired at women, children, and other noncombatants.

On February 28 and March 1, responding to KLA ambushes of the police, special forces attacked two adjacent villages, Çirez and Likoshan. These forces included helicopters, armored vehicles, mortars and machine guns which were turned without warning on civilians in the two villages. In all there were 24 civilians killed in the Çirez and Likoshan massacres. Less than one week later, on 5 March special police attacked the nearby village of Prekaz, home of Adem Jashari, the leader of the KLA. Jashari was killed along with his entire family, including women and children. The attacks, and the fighting that ensued, left 83 Kosovo Albanians dead, including elderly people and at least 24 women and children. Many of the victims were shot at close range which suggested summary executions; subsequent reports from eyewitnesses confirmed this.

On 3 March 1998, some 50,000 people gathered for the burial of 24 Drenica massacre victims in the village of Likoshan. These massacres were partly responsible for the radicalisation of the Kosovo Albanian population and helped to solidify armed opposition to Belgrade's rule. Many ethnic Albanians who had been committed to the nonviolent politics of Ibrahim Rugova decided to join the KLA, in part because they viewed armed insurgency as the only means of achieving independence.

The massacres marked the beginning of the Kosovo War. After 28 February 1998, the fighting become an armed conflict. Once armed conflict broke out, the International Criminal Tribunal for the Former Yugoslavia (ICTY) became involved. On March 10 the ICTY proclaimed that its "jurisdiction covers the recent violence in Kosovo".

On 26 September in the Drenas Municipality, Yugoslav forces had killed at least 35 civilians in the village of Gornje Obrinje after severe fighting had occurred in the Central Drenica area that led to more than a dozen of Serbian policemen getting killed. The offensive resulted in the Yugoslav forces and Serbian police capturing Donje Obrinje, Gornje Obrinje, Glanasela, Çikatovë e Vjeter and preventing KLA from recapturing Likovac. The Yugoslavs withdrew from the area on 28 September to their barracks after Mirko Marjanović declared victory in the Yugoslav September offensive.

== Massacres in 1999 ==
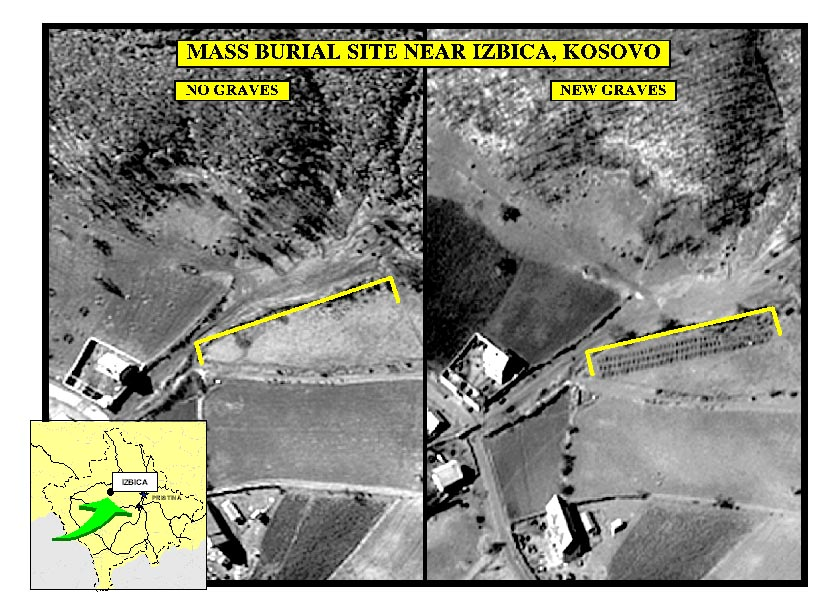
Satellite imagery of new mass burial site of Izbica massacre in Drenica region.

Three months of terror followed, as Serbian police and paramilitaries backed by the army attacked and cleared of its civilian population village after village in its efforts to destroy both the KLA and its base of support. Adult men were detained en masse and hundreds were executed. Killings were not confined to persons regarded as potential combatants. As with earlier massacres in Gornje Obrinje and Račak, women and children from the families of persons linked to the KLA were also killed.

— Report of the Human Right Watch

Between 19 March and 15 June 1999, government forces in Drenica engaged in a campaign of ethnic cleansing of the Albanians of Kosovo that involved summary and arbitrary executions, detentions, beatings, looting, and destruction of schools, hospitals, and other civilian objects." From 20 March to 31 March 1999, the Yugoslav Army and the Serbian Police conducted an offensive against the KLA in the Drenica region during the Kosovo War following the Kosovo Verification Mission (KVM)'s withdrawal from Kosovo on 20 March. According to the HLC, 14 KLA militants and more than 12 Yugoslav forces were killed during the offensive. Around 93-130 Kosovar Albanian civilians were killed in Izbica, while 19 more were killed in Padalishtë. During an offensive on the city Skenderaj, 10 more civilians were executed. By 31 March, the Yugoslav forces withdrew from Drenica and ethnic Albanian civlians were able to emerge from hiding.

Drenas, a municipality that was a stronghold of the KLA in Drenica, was hard hit by this campaign. In Poklek, a village close to Drenas, Serbian paramilitary and police units executed 53 Albanian civilians, of whom 24 children, which is known as the Poklek massacre. In Vrbovac, it is believed that 150 people were executed. Albanians, KLA members, suspected KLA members and their families in other villages surrounding Glogovac were also subject to execution by Serb forces. In Glogovac, over five days in May, the majority of the population was expelled and sent toward the Macedonian border.

In Čikatovo, more than 100 ethnic Albanians were executed and buried in a mass grave according to war crimes investigators.

On 15 June 1999, Yugoslav forces withdrew from Glogovac following an agreement signed by NATO.

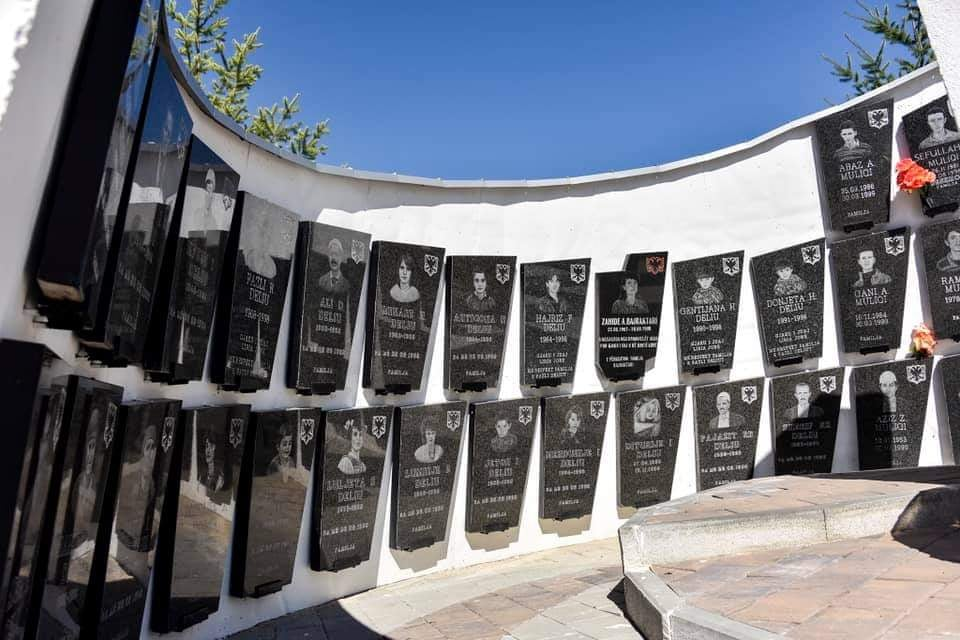
The monument dedicated to the victims of the Abri e Epërme massacre

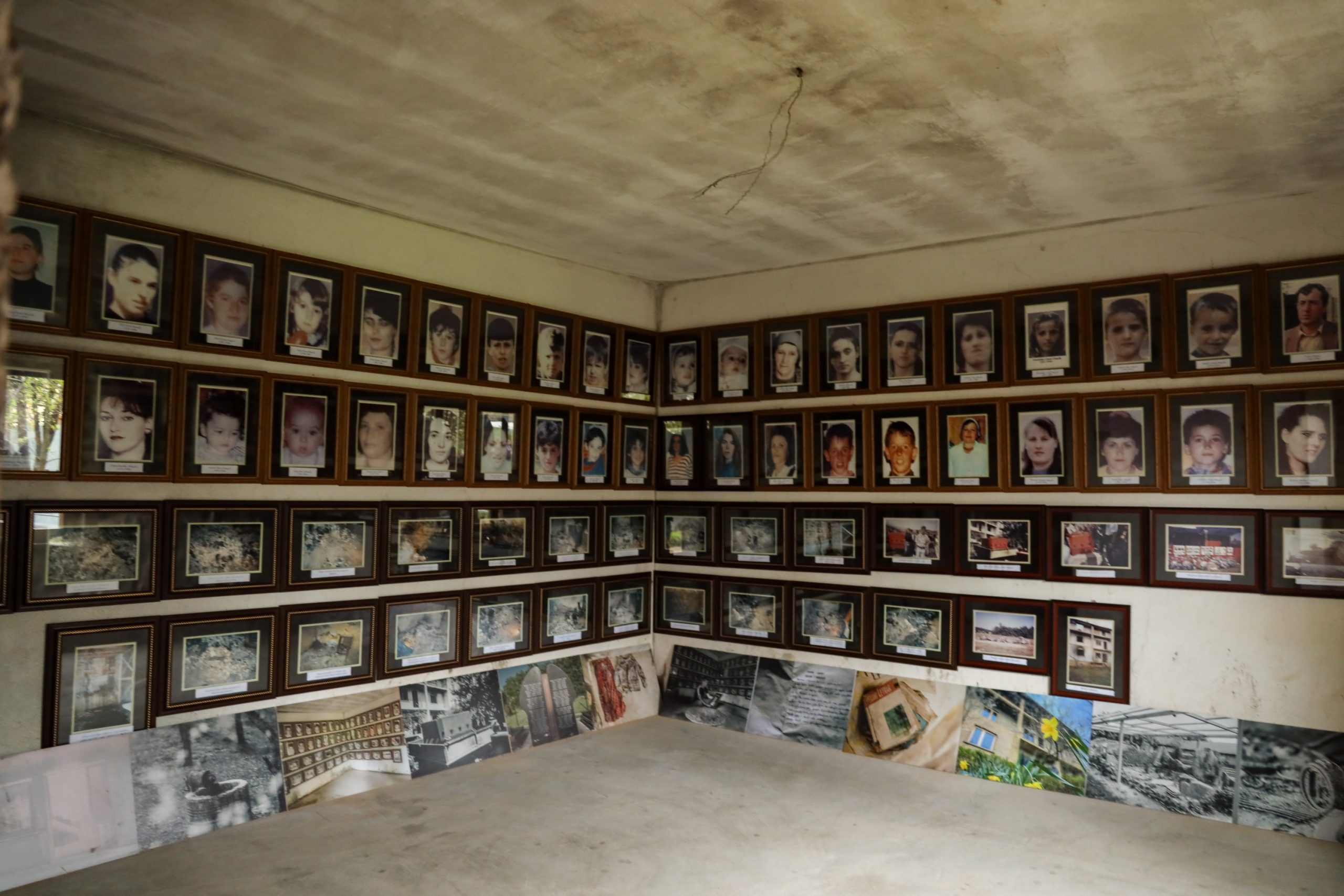
Photographs of the victims of the Poklek massacre

== Mass graves ==
In May 2010, a mass grave containing 250 bodies from the massacres were found in the village of Rudnica in Serbia. The bodies were transferred from graves located in Drenica in May or early June 1999.

== See also ==
- List of massacres in Yugoslavia
- Attack on Prekaz
- War crimes in the Kosovo War
- Death of the Bytyqi brothers
