= List of massacres in Yugoslavia =

Links and some examples of the Yugoslavia massacres

This is a list of massacres in Yugoslavia during the 20th century.

== Inter-war period (1919–41) ==
- Šahovići massacre
- Rugova Massacre
- Yugoslav colonization of Kosovo

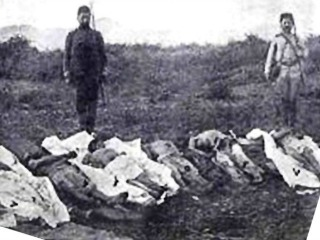
Photo of Šahovići massacre

== Cold War (1946–1991) ==
- Foibe massacres

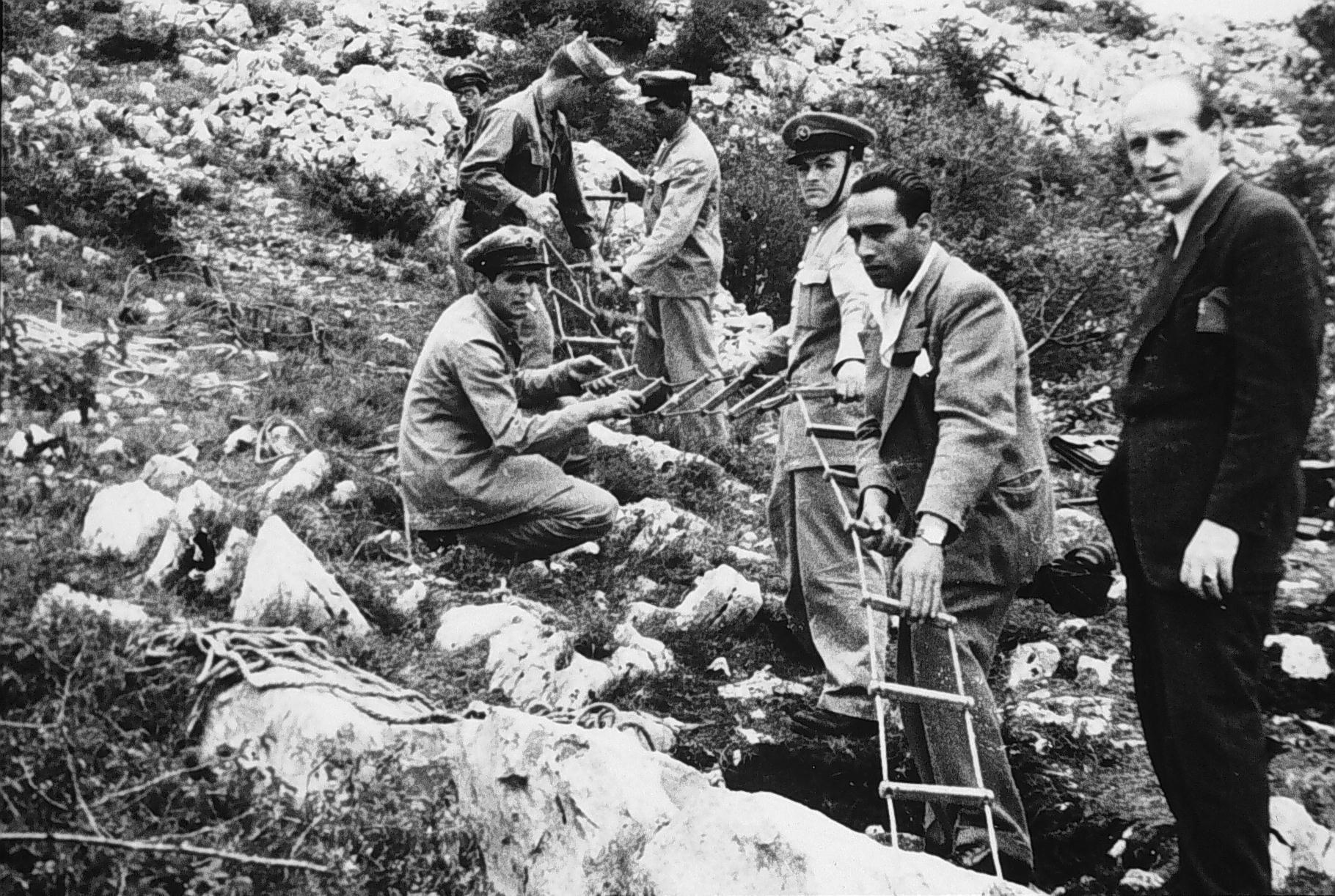
Folbe massacres exhumation

== Croatian War (1991–1995) ==
The Zagreb rocket attacks were one of the many massacres in Croatia.

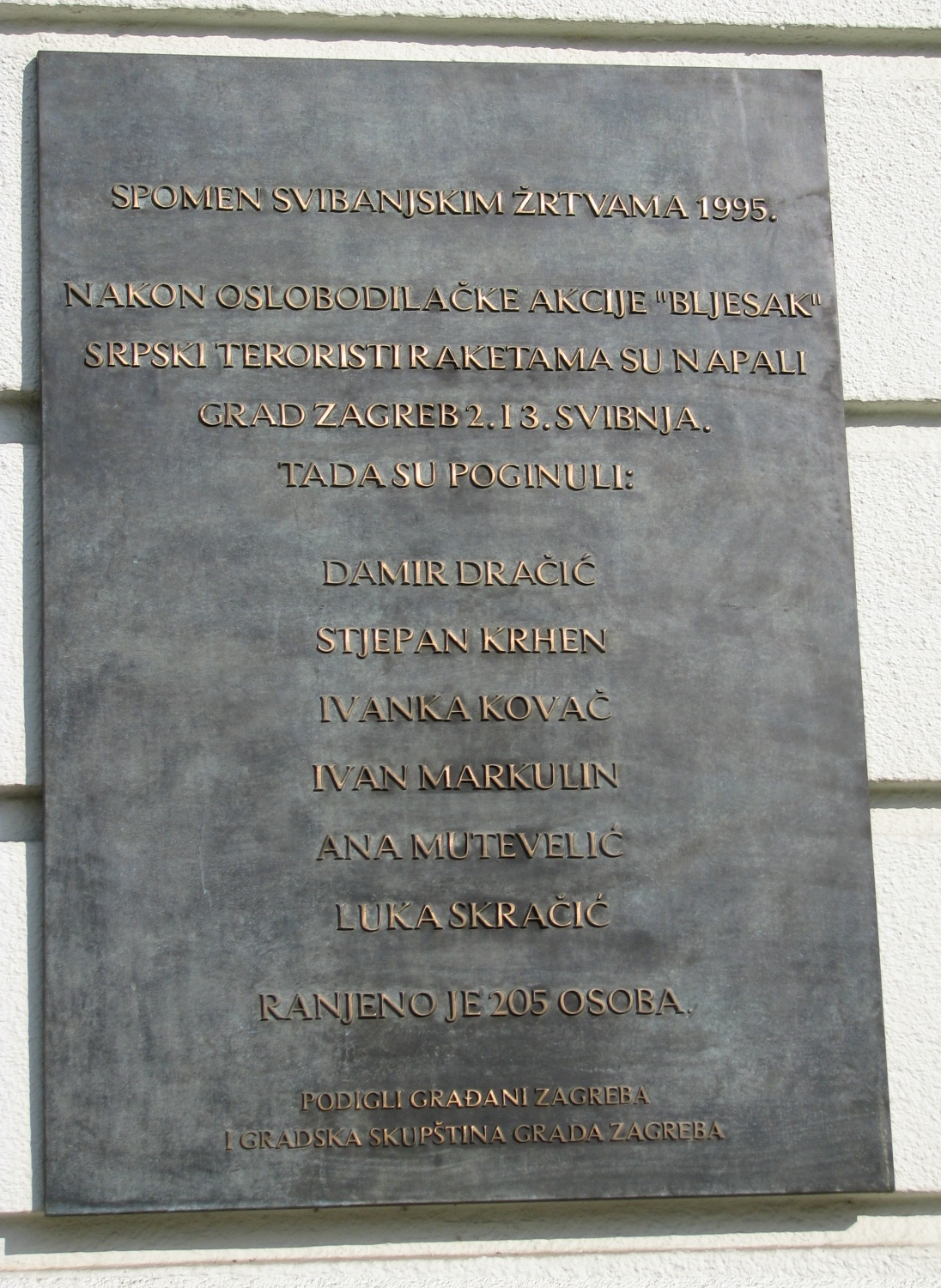
Memorial for The Zagreb rocket attacks
