= Insurgency in Kosovo (1995–1998) =

Prelude to the Kosovo War

- Part of the Serbian-Albanian conflict and the prelude to the Kosovo War
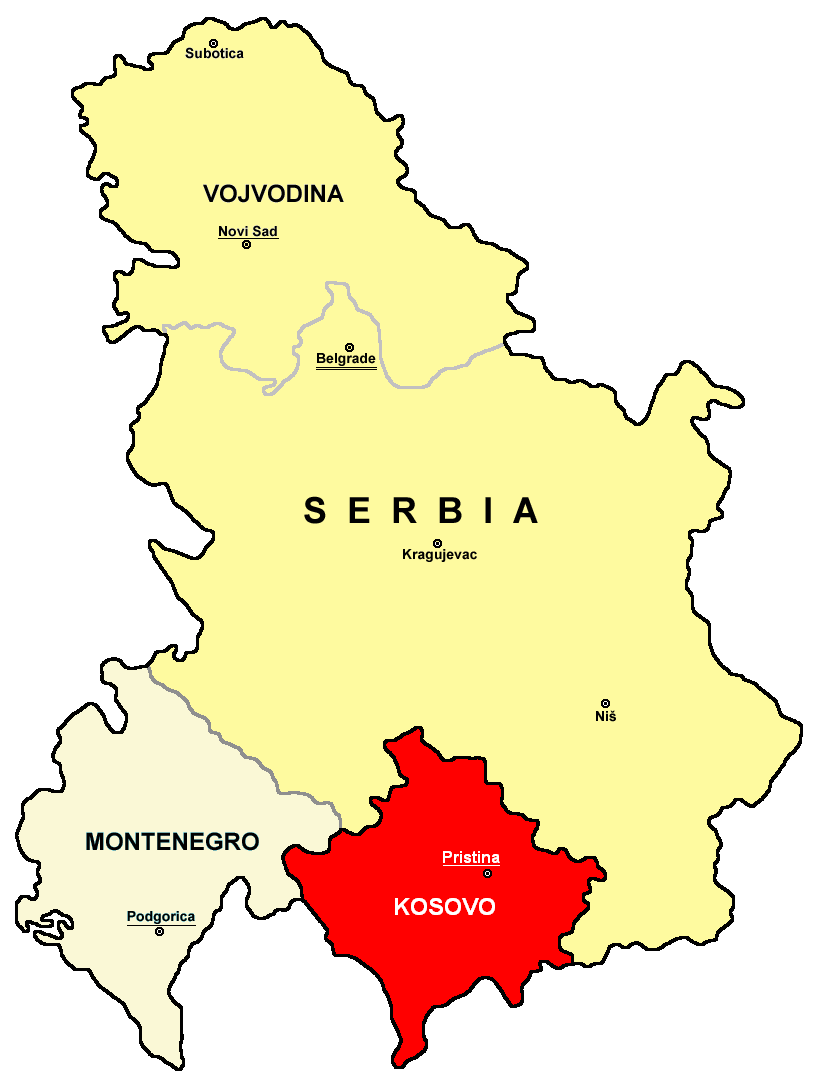
- Autonomous Province of Kosovo and Metohija, otherwise known to the Albanian population as Republic of Kosova, highlighted in red as part of the Socialist Federal Republic and later the Federal Republic of Yugoslavia (1945–1999).
Date	27 May 1995 – 27 February 1998 (2 years and 9 months)
Location	Kosovo and Metohija, Serbia, Yugoslavia
Result	Start of the Kosovo War

Belligerents
Kosovo Liberation Army	FR Yugoslavia • (Serbia) Serbian Police

Commanders and leaders
Adem Jashari; Hamëz Jashari; Nezir Nebihi; Gani Geci; Hakif Zejnullahu †; Hashim Thaçi; Sylejman Selimi; Ramush Haradinaj (WIA); Zahir Pajaziti †; Fehmi Lladrovci (WIA)	(Serbia and Montenegro) Slobodan Milošević (Serbia and Montenegro) (Serbia) Vlastimir Đorđević (Serbia and Montenegro) (Serbia) Sreten Lukić

Strength
c. 150 (before 1997) c. 300 (before 1998) c. 500 (early 1998)	(Serbia) 10,000 policemen (Serbia and Montenegro) 11,000–12,000 soldiers (early 1998)

Casualties and losses
100+ arrested 5+ killed Several wounded	(Serbia) 121 policemen killed (1997–98) (Serbia and Montenegro) 1 Air transport shot down
- 24 civilians killed (Serbian claim)

The Insurgency in Kosovo began in 1995. In 1996, the Kosovo Liberation Army (KLA) began attacking Serbian governmental buildings and police stations. This insurgency would lead to the more intense Kosovo War in February 1998.

== Background ==
The Albanian-Serbian conflict has its roots in the expulsion of the Albanians in 1877–1878 from areas that became incorporated into the Principality of Serbia. Animosity between these feuding factions remains strong to this day. The 1950s and 1960s were a period marked by repression and anti Albanian policies in Kosovo under Aleksandar Ranković, a Serbian communist who later fell out and was dismissed by Tito. During this time nationalism for Kosovar Albanians became a conduit to alleviate the conditions of the time. In 1968 Yugoslav Serb officials warned about rising Albanian nationalism and by November unrest and demonstrations by thousands of Albanians followed calling for Kosovo to attain republic status, an independent Albanian language university and some for unification with Albania. Tito rewrote the Yugoslav constitution (1974) and tried to address Albanian complaints by awarding the province of Kosovo autonomy and powers such as a veto in the federal decision making process similar to that of the republics. Kosovo functioned as a de facto republic because Kosovar Albanians attained the ability to pursue near independent foreign relations, trade and cultural links with Albania, an independent Albanian language university and Albanology institute, an Academy of Sciences and Writers association with the ability to fly the Albanian flag. These powers were revoked by Milosevic in 1989. In addition, Milosevic ordered the abolishment of the Academy of Sciences in Kosovo, Albanian street names were changed to Serbian ones, Serbs were allowed to enter the University of Pristina, Serbs received preferential treatment, and Albanians were fired from their posts or lost their homes to Serbs (130,000 between 1990-1995).

Military precursors to the KLA began in the late 1980s with armed resistance to Serb police trying to take Albanian activists in custody. Prior to the KLA, its members had been part of organizations such as the National Kosovo Movement and Popular Movement for Kosovo Liberation. The founders of the later KLA were involved in the 1981 protests in Kosovo. Many ethnic Albanian dissidents were arrested or moved to European countries, where they continued subversive activities. Repression of Albanian nationalism and Albanian nationalists by authorities in Belgrade strengthened the independence movement and focused international attention toward the plight of Kosovar Albanians.

=== Early 1990s ===
In the early 1990s, Kosovo was in a state of ethnic and political tensions, with security forces cracking down on ethnic Albanian militants amidst riots, violence, and targeted attacks on Serbian police forces and secret-service officials in retaliation for alleged abuse and murder of Albanian civilians.

From 1991 to 1992, Adem Jashari and about 100 other ethnic Albanians wishing to fight for the independence of Kosovo underwent military training in the municipality of Labinot-Mal in Albania. Afterwards, Jashari and other ethnic Albanians committed several acts of sabotage aimed at the Serbian administrative apparatus in Kosovo. Attempting to capture or kill him, Serbian police surrounded Jashari and his older brother, Hamëz, at their home in Prekaz on 30 December 1991. In the ensuing siege, large numbers of Kosovo Albanians flocked to Prekaz, forcing the Serbs to withdraw from the village and declare it a no-go area.

While in Albania, Jashari was arrested in 1993 by the government of Sali Berisha and sent to jail in Tirana before being released alongside other Kosovo Albanian militants at the demand of the Albanian Army. Jashari launched several attacks over the next several years, targeting the Yugoslav Army (VJ) and Serbian police in Kosovo. In the spring of 1993, "Homeland Calls" meetings were held in Aarau, Switzerland, organized by Xhavit Haliti, Azem Syla, Jashar Salihu and others.

KLA strategist Xhavit Halili said that in 1993, the KLA 'considered and then rejected the IRA, PLO and ETA models'. Some journalists claim that a May 1993 attack in Glogovac that left five Serbian policemen dead and two wounded was the first one carried out by the KLA.

== History ==
=== 1995 ===
In 1995, the situation morphed into an insurgency, and throughout the year Serbian patrols were ambushed and policemen were murdered. One of them was allegedly killed by the KLA. Since 1995, the KLA sought to destabilize the region, hoping the United States and NATO would intervene. It was only in the next year that the organization took responsibility for attacks.

=== 1996–1997 ===
The KLA, originally composed of a few hundred Albanians, attacked several police stations and wounded many police officers in 1996–1997.

In 1996 the British weekly The European carried an article by a French expert stating that "German civil and military intelligence services have been involved in training and equipping the rebels with the aim of cementing German influence in the Balkan area. (...) The birth of the KLA in 1996 coincided with the appointment of Hansjoerg Geiger as the new head of the BND (German secret Service). (...) The BND men were in charge of selecting recruits for the KLA command structure from the 500,000 Kosovars in Albania." Former senior adviser to the German parliament Matthias Küntzel tried to prove later on that German secret diplomacy had been instrumental in helping the KLA since its creation.

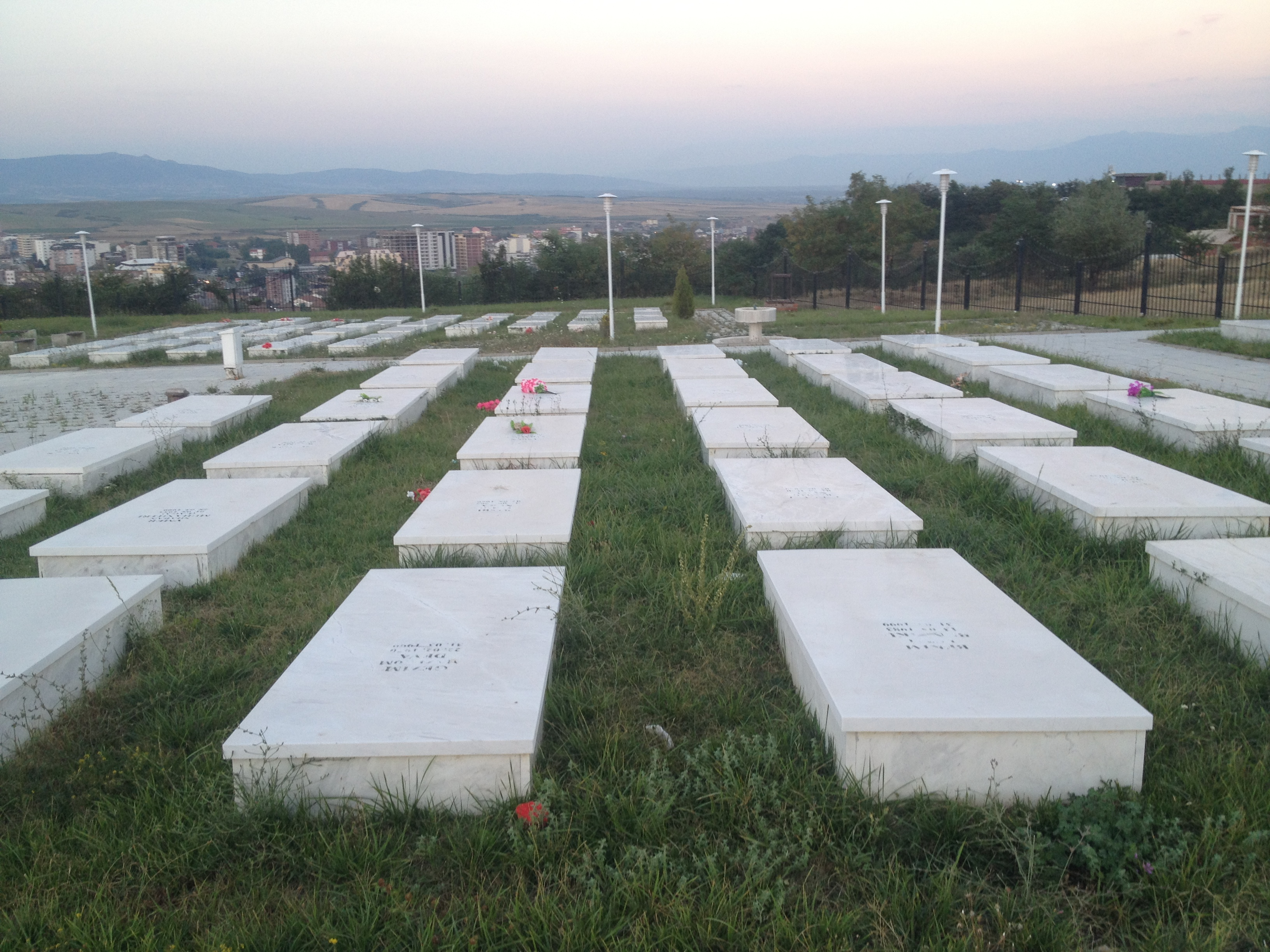
Cemetery of Albanians killed by Serbs during the Kosovo war in Gjakova

KLA representatives met with American, British, and Swiss intelligence agencies in 1996, and possibly "several years earlier" and according to The Sunday Times, "American intelligence agents have admitted they helped to train the Kosovo Liberation Army before NATO's bombing of Yugoslavia". Intelligence agents denied, however, that they were involved in arming the KLA.

In February 1996 the KLA undertook a series of attacks against police stations and Yugoslav government employees, saying that the Yugoslav authorities had killed Albanian civilians as part of an ethnic cleansing campaign. Serbian authorities denounced the KLA as a terrorist organization and increased the number of security forces in the region. This had the counter-productive effect of boosting the credibility of the embryonic KLA among the Kosovo Albanian population. On 22 April 1996, four attacks on Serbian security personnel were carried out almost simultaneously in several parts of Kosovo.

On 25 October 1996, the Kosovo Liberation Army organized an ambush in Surkis, Podujevo, which resulted in the deaths of 2 Yugoslav police officers.

In January 1997, Serbian security forces assassinated KLA commander Zahir Pajaziti and two other leaders in a highway attack between Pristina and Mitrovica, and arrested more than 100 Albanian militants.

Jashari, as one of the originators and leaders of the KLA, was convicted of terrorism in absentia by a Yugoslav court on 11 July 1997. Human Rights Watch subsequently described the trial, in which fourteen other Kosovo Albanians were also convicted, as "[failing] to conform to international standards."

The 1997 civil unrest in Albania enabled the KLA to acquire large amounts of weapons looted from Albanian armories. A 1997 intelligence report stated that the KLA received drug trafficking proceeds, used to purchase arms. The KLA received large funds from Albanian diaspora organizations. There is a possibility that among donators to the KLA were people involved in illegal activities such as drug trafficking, however insufficient evidence exists that the KLA itself was involved in such activities.

On 25 November 1997, the Yugoslav police and army were supposed to conduct a raid on the village of Rezalla but were ambushed by KLA forces led by Adem Jashari which had previously hid in the woods. After retreating, Yugoslav forces reorganized and started crossing the Skenderaj-Klina road whilst helicopter scanned ahead. Adem Jashari gathered 22 KLA insurgents and waited in the narrow pass surrounding the road. When the Yugoslav vehicles came, the KLA insurgents fired at them killing many and damaging Yugoslav artillery and vehicles. Due to this, Yugoslav forces retreated to the village of Llausha where they shot 2 Albanian teachers who worked in the primary school of the village.

On 28 November, after the battle ended, the KLA made their first public appearance at the funeral of one of the teachers killed by Serbian forces, giving a speech surrounded by a crowd consisting of hundreds of ethnic Albanian civilians.

On December 1, 1997, the KLA shot down a Yugoslav air transport near Pristina.

=== 1998 ===
Months before the NATO bombing of Yugoslavia, the North Atlantic Council said that the KLA was "the main initiator of the violence" and that it had "launched what appears to be a deliberate campaign of provocation".

James Bissett, former Canadian Ambassador to Yugoslavia, Bulgaria and Albania, wrote in 2001 that media reports indicate that "as early as 1998, the Central Intelligence Agency assisted by the British Special Air Service were arming and training Kosovo Liberation Army members in Albania to foment armed rebellion in Kosovo" with the hope that "NATO could intervene (...)".

Pursuing Adem Jashari for the murder of a Serb policeman, the Serbian forces again attempted to assault the Jashari compound in Prekaz on 22 January 1998. With Jashari not present, thousands of Kosovo Albanians descended on Prekaz and again succeeded in pushing the Serbian forces out of the village and its surroundings. The next month, a small unit of the KLA was ambushed by Serb policemen. Four Serbs were killed and two were injured in the ensuing clashes. At dawn on 5 March 1998, according to the Serbian public report, the KLA launched an attack against a police patrol in Prekaz, which was then answered by a police operation on the Jashari compound which left 58 Albanians dead, including Jashari and the majority of his family members. Four days after this, a NATO meeting was convoked, during which Madeleine Albright pushed for an anti-Serbian response. NATO now threatened Serbia with a military response. The Kosovo War ensued, with subsequent NATO intervention, which started after the Račak massacre was uncovered during the course of the war.

== Attacks ==
Between 1991 and 1997, mostly in 1996–97, 39 people were killed by the KLA. Serbian officials reported that attacks between 1996 and February of 1998 led to the deaths of 10 policemen and 24 civilians.

The KLA launched 31 attacks in 1996, 55 in 1997, and 66 in January and February 1998. After the KLA killed four policemen in early March 1998, special Serbian police units retaliated and attacked three villages in Drenica. The total number of attacks by the KLA in 1998 was 1,470, compared to 66 the year before. After the attacks against the Yugoslav police intensified in 1998, security increased as did the presence of Yugoslav Army personnel, which led to the Kosovo War.

== Aftermath ==
Due to the overall success in the KLA's guerrilla activities and the intensification of their attacks in 1998, the Yugoslav army would increase deployment in Kosovo, with the tension ultimately culminating in the Kosovo War.

During the insurgency, rebel forces were able to capture most of the region of Drenica, especially after the events in 1997.

== See also ==
- History of Kosovo
