= Llaushë =

Laushë Lauša
- Village
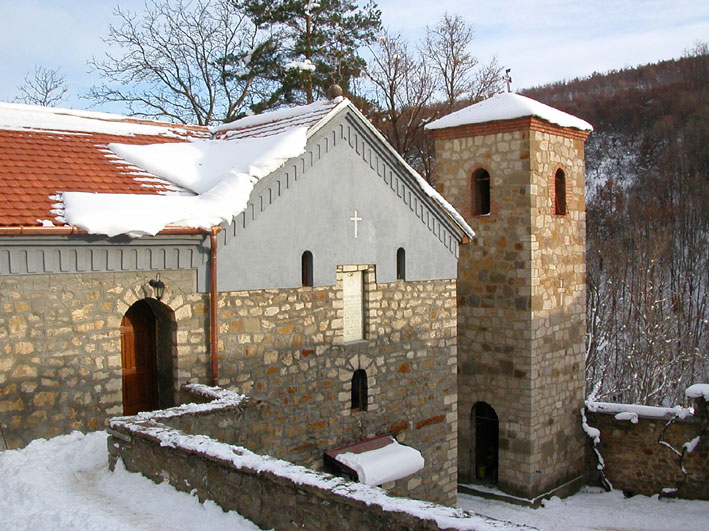
- Devič Monastery

- Location in Kosovo
- Location: Kosovo
- District: Mitrovicë
- Municipality: Skenderaj

Population (2024)
  - Total: 2,201
- Time zone: UTC+1 (CET)
  - Summer (DST): UTC+2 (CEST)

Llaushë or Lauša (Serbian Cyrillic: Лауша) is a village in Skenderaj, Mitrovica, Kosovo.

== Monuments ==
The village is home to the Devič Serbian Orthodox monastery, built in 1434.

== Notable people ==
- Fadil Geci, Kosovar Albanian former politician and veteran of the KLA
- Gani Geci, Kosovar Albanian former politician and veteran of the KLA
- Mërgim Vojvoda, Kosovan football player
