= Shaban Jashari =

Kosovar Albanian patriarch killed in the 1998 Attack on Prekaz

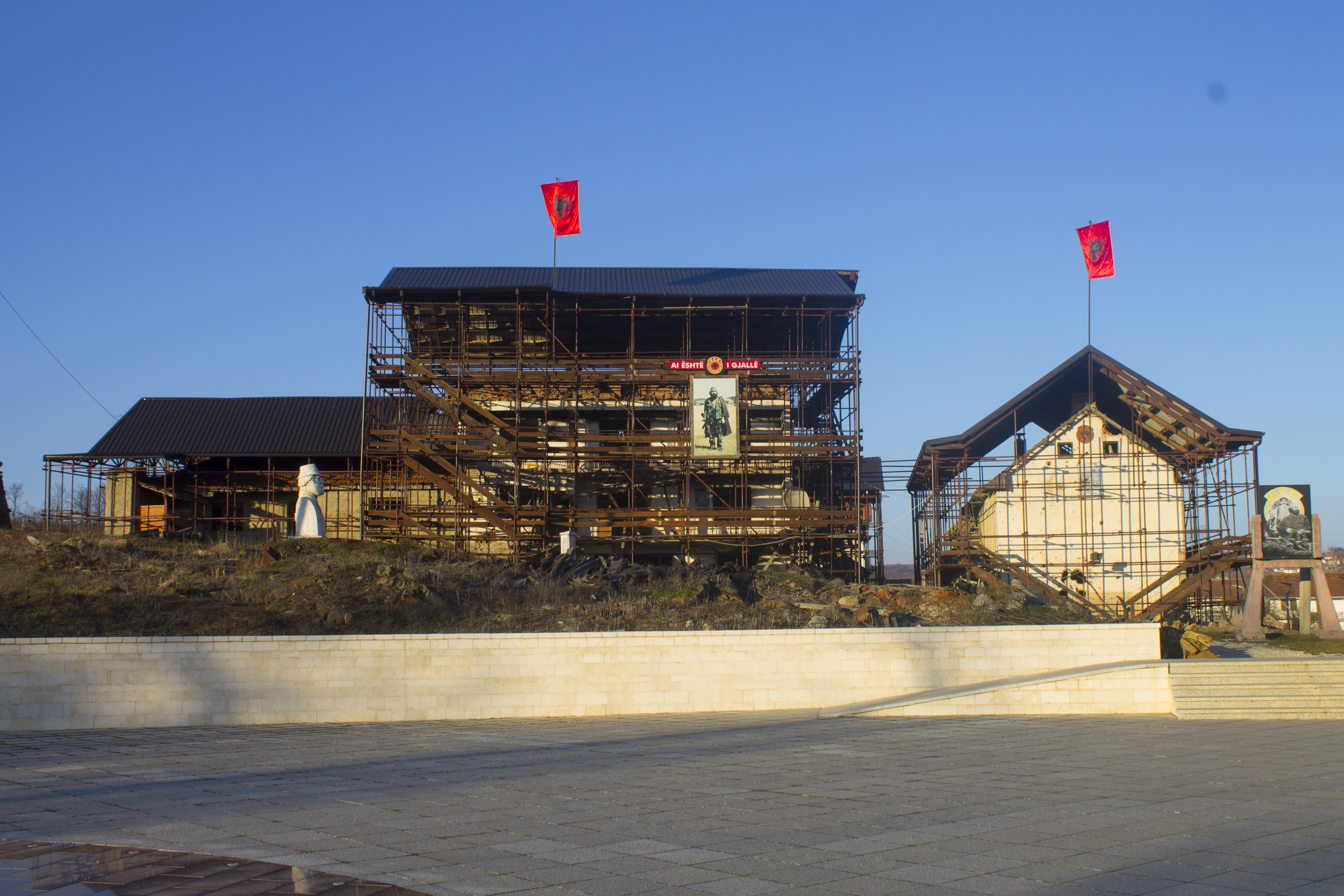
- The Jashari family compound in Prekaz, later preserved as part of the Adem Jashari Memorial Complex
- Born: 2 April 1924; Prekaz, Skenderaj, SAP Kosovo, SFR Yugoslavia (now Kosovo)
- Died: 5 March 1998 (aged 73); Prekaz, FR Yugoslavia (now Kosovo)
- Known for: Patriarch of the Jashari family, killed during the Attack on Prekaz
- Relatives: Adem Jashari (son) · Hamëz Jashari (son) · Rifat Jashari (son) · Bashkim Jashari (grandson) · Bekim Jashari (grandson) · Besarta Jashari (granddaughter)

Shaban Jashari (2 April 1924 – 5 March 1998) was a Kosovar Albanian farmer and patriarch of the Jashari family of Prekaz, Skenderaj. He is remembered for being killed, alongside dozens of relatives, during the Attack on Prekaz, an event considered a turning point in the Kosovo War.

== Life ==
Shaban Jashari was born on 2 April 1924 in Prekaz, a village in the Drenica region of Kosovo. His family, descended from the Kuçi tribe, was known for its involvement in Albanian resistance against Yugoslav authority. Shaban was the son of Murat Jashari and the father of Adem Jashari, one of the founders of the Kosovo Liberation Army (KLA), and Hamëz Jashari, both of whom became commanders during the 1990s insurgency.

== Attack on Prekaz ==
On 5–7 March 1998, Serbian special police and Yugoslav forces besieged the Jashari family compound in Prekaz. The assault, later documented by Human Rights Watch and Amnesty International, resulted in the deaths of 58 family members, including Shaban, his sons Adem and Hamëz, and many women and children. The attack left only a handful of survivors, including his granddaughter Besarta Jashari, his son Rifat Jashari who was not present during the siege, and grandsons Bashkim Jashari and Bekim Jashari.

== Legacy ==
Shaban’s home and compound have been preserved as part of the Adem Jashari Memorial Complex, a national monument and site of annual commemoration ceremonies. The complex attracts thousands of visitors each year, serving as a shrine to the Jashari family’s role in the independence struggle.

== See also ==
- Adem Jashari
- Hamëz Jashari
- Rifat Jashari
- Bashkim Jashari
- Bekim Jashari
- Attack on Prekaz
