= Besarta Jashari =

Kosovar survivor and eyewitness of the 1998 Attack on Prekaz

- Born: Prekaz, Skenderaj, SAP Kosovo, SFR Yugoslavia (now Kosovo)
- Known for: Sole survivor inside the Attack on Prekaz; eyewitness testimony featured by the BBC
- Relatives: Hamëz Jashari (father) · Adem Jashari (uncle) · Rifat Jashari (uncle) · Bekim Jashari (brother) · Bashkim Jashari (cousin)

Besarta Jashari is a Kosovar Albanian survivor and eyewitness of the Attack on Prekaz, during which Serbian special police and Yugoslav forces besieged the Jashari family compound in the village of Prekaz. International outlets and human rights organizations describe the assault as a pivotal event of the Kosovo War. Besarta was the only person to survive inside the house of her grandfather Shaban Jashari.

Her account of the siege was featured by the BBC's Witness History, which presented her as the sole surviving child from inside the compound. BIRN/Prishtina Insight has profiled the preservation of Jashari family artifacts and commemorations that reference her survival and testimony.

== Early life and family ==
Besarta was born in Prekaz, Skenderaj, into the extended Jashari family. She is the daughter of KLA commander Hamëz Jashari and the niece of Adem Jashari, a founding commander of the Kosovo Liberation Army (KLA).

== Attack on Prekaz and survival ==
From 5 to 7 March 1998, Serbian special police and Yugoslav forces attacked the Jashari compound with heavy weapons. Human Rights Watch documented the operation and its civilian toll.

Contemporary reports identify Besarta as the only survivor from inside the house, in which she later described the events in a BBC interview.

== Later life and public role ==
Her survival has been referenced at national commemorations and in museum exhibits that document the conflict. BIRN's Reporting House museum in Prishtina preserves the children's notebook of the Jashari family—bearing Besarta's name—as a central artefact of the exhibition. Regional media have covered her public remarks during annual commemorations of the “KLA Epic”.

== Legacy ==
The Adem Jashari Memorial Complex in Prekaz is a national memorial site where surviving relatives, including Besarta's uncle Rifat Jashari and cousin Bashkim Jashari, host officials and visitors. Scholars and journalists have described the Jashari family's story—of which Besarta's testimony forms a key part—as central to Kosovo's post-war memory.

== See also ==
- Attack on Prekaz
- Adem Jashari
- Hamëz Jashari
- Rifat Jashari
- Bashkim Jashari
- Bekim Jashari
