= Baks, Skenderaj =

Baks
- Village
- Location in Kosovo
- Coordinates: 42°43′09″N 20°52′36″E
- Location: Kosovo
- District: Mitrovica
- Municipality: Skenderaj
- Elevation: 2,300 ft (700 m)

Population (2024)
  - Total: 552
- Time zone: UTC+1 (CET)
  - Summer (DST): UTC+2 (CEST)
- Area code: +381 290
- Car plates: 02

Baks is a settlement in the Skenderaj municipality in Kosovo. It lies 680–700 m over sea level. The village is exclusively inhabited by ethnic Albanians; in the 1991 census, it had 1044 inhabitants.

== Geography ==
It lies in the hilly region of Drenica, on the western slopes of Çiçavica, six km southeast from Skenderaj.

== History ==
The ethnic Albanian Kosovo Liberation Army (KLA) had by 1997 controlled large parts of the Drenica region to save the Albanian population from Serbian forces. The nearby. village of Prekaz was the home to KLA leader Adem Jashari, who was killed together with most of his family in the Attack on Prekaz. During the Kosovo War, in late March 1999, Serb military forces undertook an offensive throughout Skenderaj. Villages were shelled and inhabitants of several villages, including Baks, fled to Çirez. Men from the village were captured and some were killed by Serb police during operations in Drenas and Skenderaj.

Demographic history
Ethnic group	1948	1953	1961	1971	1981	1991
Albanians					881	
Others					1	
Total	732	587	628	688	882	1044

== Economy ==
The village is primarily of livestock farming.

== Sources ==
- Krieger, Heike (2001). The Kosovo Conflict and International Law: An Analytical Documentation 1974-1999. Cambridge University Press. ISBN 978-0-521-80071-6.
- "Under Orders: War Crimes in Kosovo". Human Rights Watch.
- Geographic Baks
