= Prekaz =

Prekaz may refer to several places and events in Kosovo:

- Prekaz i Epërm, a village in Skenderaj municipality
- Prekaz i Poshtëm, a village in Skenderaj municipality; see list of populated places in Kosovo
- Siege of Prekaz (1991), a military operation during the Prewar period of Kosovo, at Prekaz i Epërm
- First Attack on Prekaz, a military operation in January 1998 during the Insurgency in Kosovo, at Prekaz i Epërm
- Attack on Prekaz, a March 1998 operation during the Kosovo War, at Prekaz i Epërm
