= Ilaz Kodra =

Kosovo Liberation Army soldier

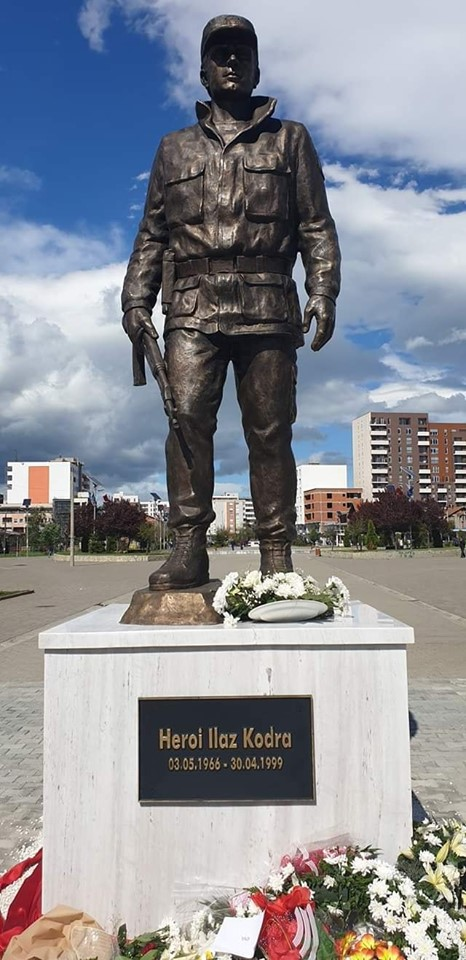
- Statue of Ilaz Kodra in Drenas
- Born: 3 May 1966; Prekaz i Epërm, Skënderaj, SFR Yugoslavia (today Kosovo)
- Died: 30 April 1999 (aged 32); Shtuticë, Drenas, FR Yugoslavia (today Kosovo)
- Military career
- Allegiance: Kosova
- Branch: Kosovo Liberation Army
- Service years: 1991–1999
- Rank: Commander
- Unit: Brigada 114, “Fehmi Lladrovci”
- Conflicts: Insurgency in Kosovo (1995–98): Drenas Attack; First Battle of Rezalla; First Attack on Prekaz; Kosovo War: Attacks on Likoshane and Çirez; Battle of Llapushnik; KLA Summer offensive (1998); Central Drenica offensive; Battle of Shtuticë †
- Awards: Hero of Kosovo (posthumously)

Ilaz Kodra (3 May 1966 – 30 April 1999) was one of the founders and early commanders of Kosovo Liberation Army, who died during the Battle of Shtuticë, he is regarded as one of the most prominent leaders of the KLA and the "right hand of Adem Jashari".

== Early life ==
Ilaz Kodra was born on May 3, 1966, in Prekaz i Epërm, Kosovo. He completed his primary education in his hometown, followed by eight years of schooling and secondary education in Skënderaj. After high school, he enrolled in the Higher Commercial School in Pejë and fulfilled his mandatory military service in the Yugoslav People's Army in Slovenia.

Kodra was deeply influenced by the patriotic and revolutionary spirit that permeated the youth of Prekaz, particularly following the resistance of Tahir and Nebih Meha on May 13, 1981, against Yugoslav police forces. This event had a profound impact on Kodra, who, like the Jashari brothers, Adem and Hamëz, saw the need for armed resistance against the occupying forces, especially as Yugoslavia began to disintegrate during the wars in Slovenia, Croatia, and Bosnia.

== Involvement in the Kosovo Liberation Army ==
=== Founding the KLA and First Actions ===
In collaboration with like-minded individuals, including the Jashari Brothers, several Members of the Selimi and Lushtaku Families, Kodra helped form the first nucleus of what would later become the Kosovo Liberation Army, initially known as the Army of Kosovo. In 1991, Kodra, along with his comrades, crossed into Albania to undergo military training, facilitated with the knowledge and support of Albanian President Ramiz Alia. Amongst the most known members of the group where Adem Jashari, Hamëz Jashari, Zahir Pajaziti and Sali Çekaj.

Kodra played a crucial role in the early armed actions of the KLA. On May 22, 1993, Kodra, along with Sami Lushtaku, Besim Rama, and others, launched a successful ambush against Serbian police forces near Drenas. The attack killed five Serbian officers and injured several others, signaling the start of armed resistance in the region. This act of defiance inspired the local population, fueling the belief that Kosovo's liberation was possible.

By October 1996, the Serbian occupation authorities had initiated legal proceedings against Kodra, Adem Jashari, and 13 of their fellow fighters ( including Hashim Thaqi and Rexhep Selimi ). They were charged with forming a "terrorist group" and accused of stockpiling weapons, conducting military training, and preparing for attacks against Serbian forces. The indictment detailed their training in Albania and the group's efforts to arm and mobilize for guerrilla warfare in Kosovo, specifically in the neighboring regions of Drenica, Mitrovicë and Peja.

Kodra participated in the Battle of Rezalla from 26 to 28 November 1997 along with Adem Jashari, Mujë Krasniqi, Abedin Rexha, Nuhi Geci and many other KLA fighters.

=== During the War ===
In the aftermath of the Massacre in Prekaz in March 1998, where Adem Jashari and nearly the whole of the Jashari family were killed, Kodra continued to fight. Alongside figures like Fehmi Lladrovci and Abedin Rexha, Kodra was instrumental in expanding KLA operations across Kosovo.

As part of the leadership team in Drenica, Kodra worked alongside notable figures such as Sami Lushtaku, Hashim Thaçi, Mujë Krasniqi, Sylejman and Rexhep Selimi. Together, they helped organize, structure, and expand the resistance movement across key regions like Dukagjin, Anadrin, Nerodimë, Shalë, and Llap. Their collective efforts resulted in a well-coordinated resistance that played a vital role in the KLA's strategic victories.

Kodra's military acumen was particularly evident in the rugged terrain of the Qyqavica mountains and throughout Central Drenica. His leadership extended beyond planning; he was actively involved in combat operations, demonstrating a hands-on approach to warfare. He was instrumental in training and mobilizing troops, including volunteers from local communities and members of his own family, such as Samiu, Hasani, Nysreti, and others. His brigade became a symbol of resilience, fighting against overwhelming odds in the face of Serbian aggression.

One of the most defining moments of Kodra's military career came after the death of Fehmi Lladrovci and Xhevë Krasniqi-Lladrovci on September 22, 1998. Kodra was appointed the commander of the 114th Brigade, which was subsequently named "Fehmi Lladrovci" in honor of its former leader. His brigade operated extensively across the whole Drenica Operational Zone, from Qyqavica mountains to villages and cities like Prekaz i Epërm and Skënderaj.

In early 1999, the Serbian military launched a series of major offensives throughout Kosovo, attempting to crush the remaining pockets of KLA resistance. One of these offensives targeted the Drenica region, where Ilaz Kodra was positioned with his men. Serbian forces intensified their brutal crackdown on the local Albanian population, with heavy artillery and airstrikes to overwhelm the KLA fighters and their civilian supporters.

== Death ==
On April 30, 1999, while defending civilians in the village of Shtuticë, Ilaz Kodra fell in battle. His comrade, Zenun Kodra, recalled the fierce fight against Serbian forces that morning. His death occurred while he was defending his position against a Serbian assault, and it marked a significant loss for the KLA.

== Legacy ==
The loss of Kodra, along with many other KLA commanders and fighters in the late stages of the war, left an indelible mark on the people of Kosovo, who continue to honor his memory as a national hero. Ilaz Kodra is remembered as a key figure in the fight for Kosovo's liberation. His close relationship with Adem Jashari and participation in crucial battles made him one of the most important commanders of the Kosovo Liberation Army. On the 17th anniversary of his death, the President of Kosovo and his former comrade, Hashim Thaqi, commemorated Ilaz Kodra with the title Hero of Kosovo. He was also commemorated by the current President of Kosovo Vjosa Osmani and the current Prime Minister of Kosovo Albin Kurti. The sports palace in Skenderaj was named after him.

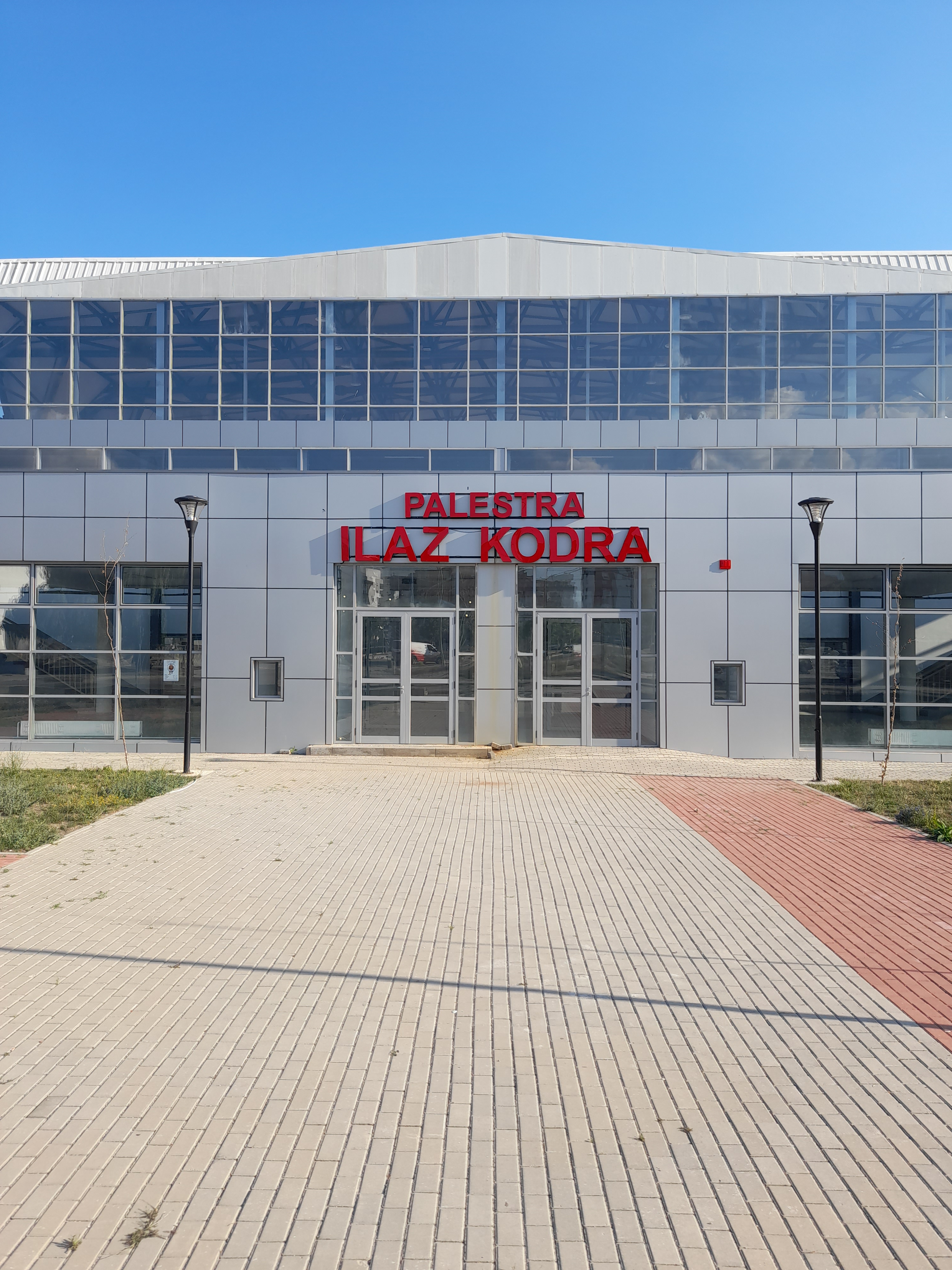
Ilaz Kodra Sports Palace
