= Rifat Jashari =

Kosovan public figure (born 1946)

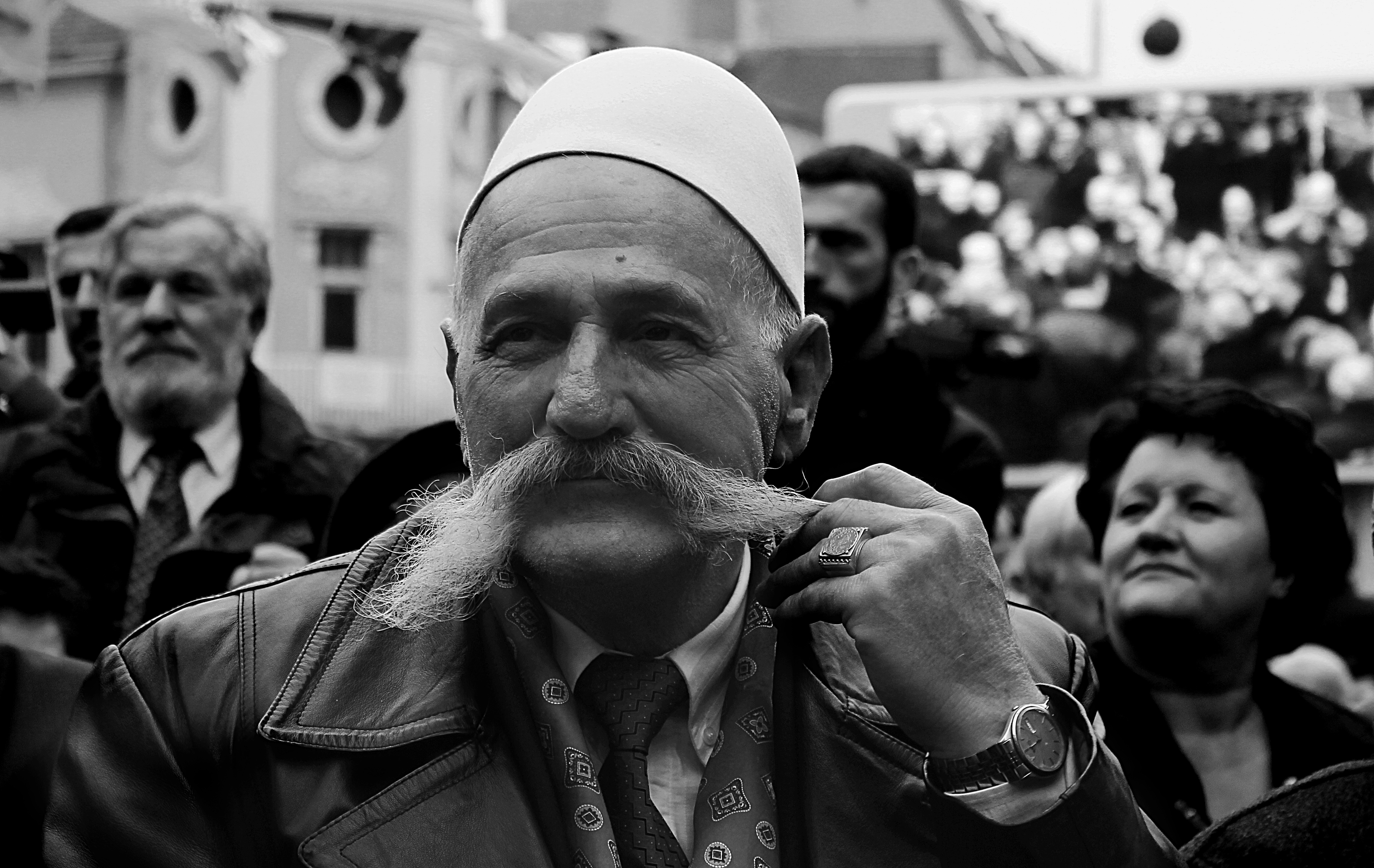
- Rifat Jashari at a commemoration event in Prekaz, Skenderaj
- Born: 1 December 1946 (age 79); Prekaz, Skenderaj, Kosovo
- Occupations: Public figure, patriarch
- Known for: Surviving the Prekaz massacre; brother of Adem Jashari and Hamëz Jashari; advocate for national unity
- Relatives: Adem Jashari (brother); Hamëz Jashari (brother); Bashkim Jashari (son)
- Awards: Order of Freedom (2020, 2023); Honorary Citizen of Tetovo (2022)

Rifat Jashari (born 1946) is a Kosovan public figure and patriarch of the Jashari family, known as the surviving brother of Kosovo Liberation Army (KLA) commanders Adem Jashari and Hamëz Jashari. He is regarded as a symbol of resilience and national unity in Kosovo, having survived the 1998 Attack on Prekaz that killed 58 members of his extended family, including his wife and three daughters.

== Early life and resistance ==
Rifat Jashari was born in 1946 in Prekaz, Skenderaj, a village in the Drenica region of Kosovo, then part of the Socialist Federal Republic of Yugoslavia. During the early 1990s, while working in Germany, he provided financial support to his brothers Adem and Hamëz in their efforts to establish the KLA. He also took part in the Siege of Prekaz (1991), where the family compound resisted an attempt by Serbian forces to capture Adem Jashari.

== Prekaz massacre ==
The Jashari compound in Prekaz, Skenderaj was repeatedly targeted in the 1990s. In the largest assault, between 5–7 March 1998, Yugoslav special police and military forces besieged the family home in the Attack on Prekaz. The assault killed 58 people, including 56 members of the Jashari family. Among the victims were Rifat's wife and three daughters. Rifat survived because he was abroad with his son Bashkim Jashari. Returning afterward, he became a leading figure in commemorations and a guardian of the Jashari legacy.

== Post-war role ==
Since the Kosovo War, Rifat has remained active in public life, advocating unity among Kosovo's political leaders and preserving the memory of his family's sacrifice. He often hosts visitors at the Adem Jashari Memorial Complex in Prekaz, Skenderaj, which has become a national monument and a symbol of Kosovo's struggle.

== Awards and recognition ==
- Order of Freedom (2020), awarded by Acting President Vjosa Osmani on the birthday of Adem Jashari.
- Order of Freedom (2023), reaffirmed on the 25th anniversary of the KLA Epic.
- Honorary Citizen of Tetovo (2022), awarded by the Municipality of Tetovo, North Macedonia.

== Family and legacy ==
His son, Bashkim Jashari, survived the massacre and later became Commander of the Kosovo Security Force. The Adem Jashari Memorial Complex in Prekaz, Skenderaj remains one of Kosovo's most visited sites, preserving the family's story and sacrifice.

== See also ==
- Adem Jashari
- Hamëz Jashari
- Kosovo Liberation Army
- Kosovo War
