= First Attack on Prekaz =

1998 military operation in Europe

- Part of the Insurgency in Kosovo (1995–1998)
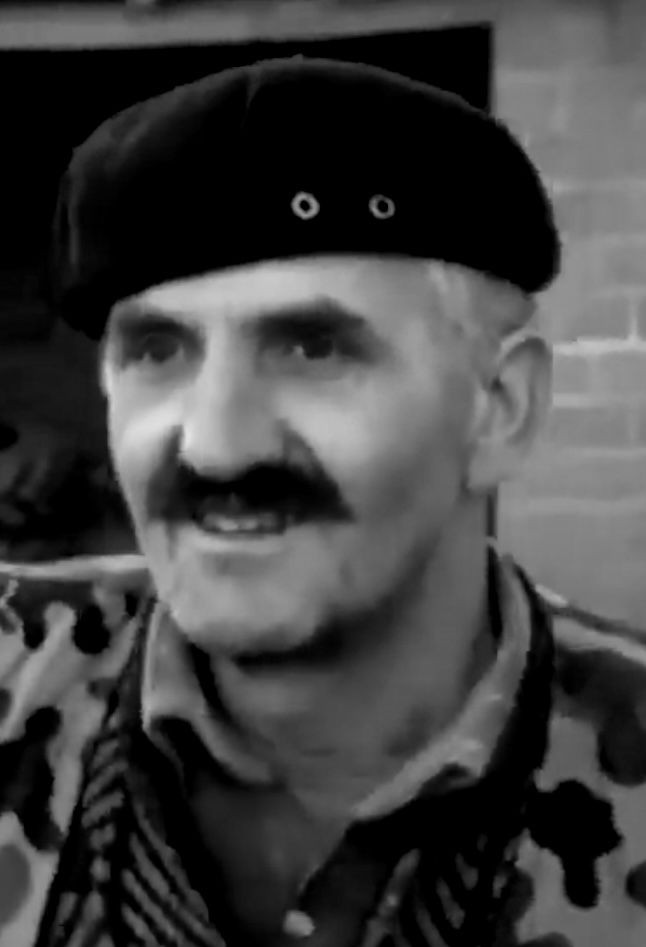
- Hamëz Jashari during an interview after the attack
Date	22 January – 23 January 1998
Location	Prekaz, FR Yugoslavia (present-day Kosovo)
Result	KLA victory: Yugoslav Forces launch a second attack months later

Belligerents
(Federal Republic of Yugoslavia) FR Yugoslavia	Kosovo Liberation Army

Commanders and leaders
(Federal Republic of Yugoslavia) Unknown	Shaban Jashari; Hamëz Jashari; Ilaz Kodra

Units involved
(Federal Republic of Yugoslavia) Yugoslav Army; Serbian police	Kosovo Liberation Army

Strength
(Federal Republic of Yugoslavia) Unknown	22 January: Several militants 23 January: Several militants and thousands of Adem Jashari's supporters

Casualties and losses
Unknown	None
- (Albania) Two Jashari children wounded by Serbian police

The First Attack on Prekaz occurred on 22 and 23 January 1998 during the Insurgency in Kosovo when the Yugoslav Army and Serbian police attacked the Jashari compound in Donji Prekaz, Kosovo. The goal of the attack was to arrest one of the founders of the Kosovo Liberation Army (KLA), Adem Jashari after he was charged with terrorism in absentia along with several other individuals in a trial that was criticized for not conforming to international standards.

Adem Jashari was not present during the attack and the police retreated after being repelled by men inside the compound on 22 January. The police made a second attempt a day later but were repelled by thousands of Adem Jashari's supporters that descended on the village.

The attack was followed by a larger attack initiated months later on 5 March 1998, which resulted in the deaths of Adem Jashari, his brother Hamëz, and nearly sixty other people, many of them women, children, and elderly people.

== Background ==
Adem and Hamëz Jashari were members of the Kosovo Liberation Army (KLA), a militant group of Kosovo Albanians that sought the independence of Kosovo from Yugoslavia. Adem Jashari was responsible for organizing the first armed political formation in Skënderaj, in 1991.

On 30 December 1991, during what today is referred to as the prewar period, a large convoy of Yugoslav security forces with armored vehicles and helicopters conducted a siege of the Jashari compound at the village of Prekaz. After four Yugoslav authorities were killed and a mob of armed and unarmed Albanians descended into the village, Yugoslav forces withdrew from the village and deemed it as a no-go area.

== Attack ==
In an attempt to arrest KLA commander Adem Jashari for killing a Serbian policeman, Serbian forces assaulted the Jashari compound in Donji Prekaz on 22 January 1998 at 5:20 am. However, Adem was not there at the time, but several KLA fighters from the Jashari family were and repelled the Yugoslav forces away from the village.

The next day, on January 23, the police and military made another attempt to assault the village. During this second attempt, a mob of thousands of Albanians who supported Adem Jashari entered the village in defense of the compound. Afterwards, the Yugoslav forces withdrew from Donji Prekaz.

During the attack, the Jasharis were aided by friends and neighbors that came into Donji Prekaz from the woods. The KLA and the Jashari family suffered no casualties from the assault, as many were hiding in the woods. However, two of Adem Jashari's nieces were injured by the Serbian police during the assault on the compound.

After the attack, the Serbian Ministry of Internal Affairs claimed that the attack was a shootout between local gangs.

== Aftermath ==
After Yugoslav forces failed to capture Adem Jashari for a second time, they conducted a far larger attack on 5 to 7 March which killed 59 people including 28 women and young children and at least three people by summary execution. The attack was heavily criticized by human rights organizations as excessive force. According to Amnesty International, the attack was meant to kill all suspects and their families rather than arresting or apprehending armed Albanians.
