= Bashkim Jashari =

Kosovar military officer

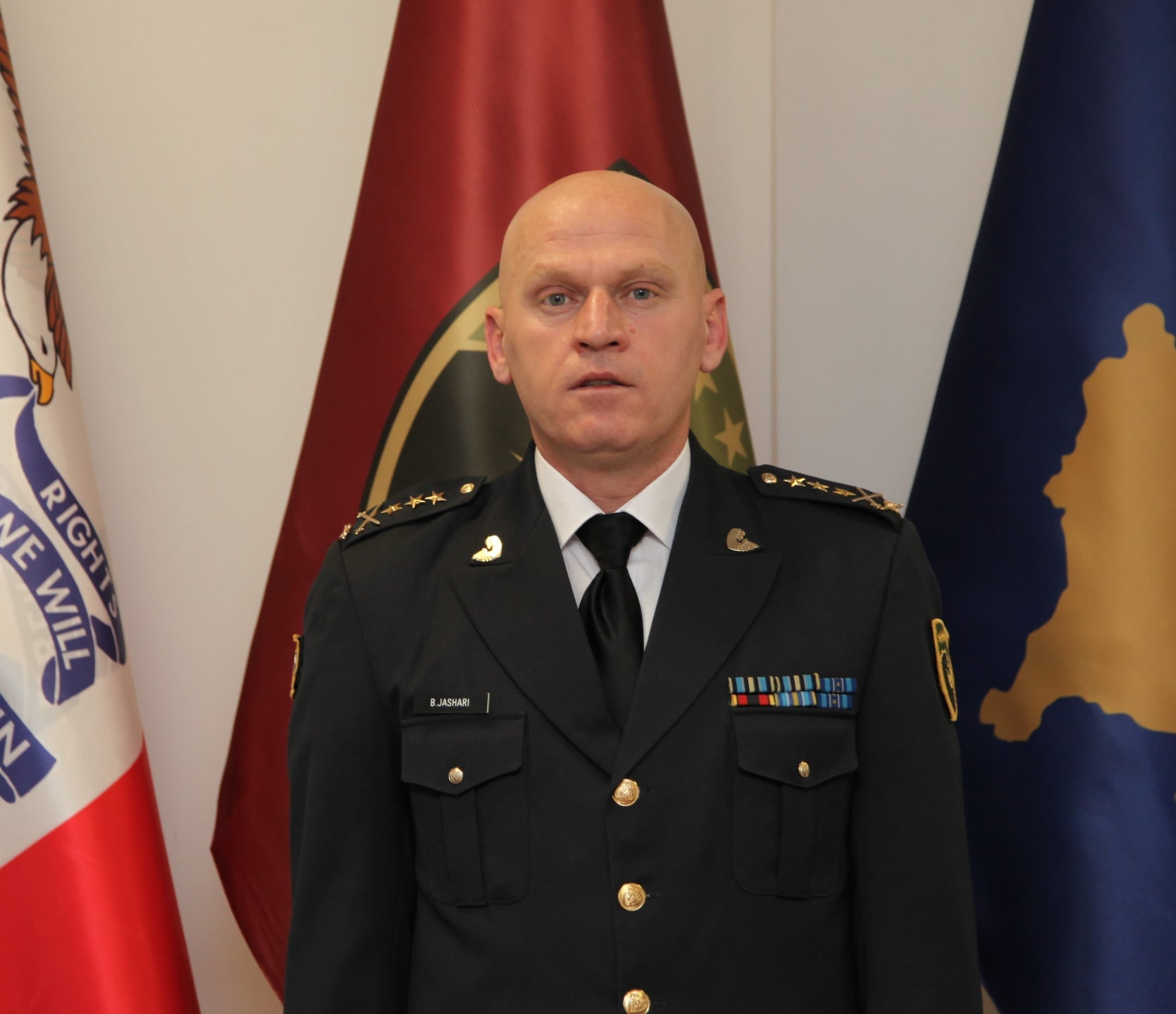
- Lt. Gen. Bashkim Jashari

Commander of Kosovo Security Force
- Incumbent
- Assumed office 30 November 2021
- President: Vjosa Osmani
- Ministry of Defence: Ejup Maqedonci
- Preceded by: Rrahman Rama

Personal details
- Born: 15 November 1977 (age 49) Prekaz, Skenderaj, SAP Kosovo, SFR Yugoslavia (present-day Kosovo)
- Relations: Rifat Jashari (father) · Adem Jashari (uncle)

Military service
- Allegiance: Kosovo
- Branch/service: Kosovo Liberation Army; Kosovo Protection Corps; Kosovo Security Force
- Years of service: 1998–1999; 1999–2009; 2009–present
- Rank: Lieutenant General
- Battles/wars: Kosovo War

Bashkim Jashari (born November 15, 1977) is a Kosovar Albanian three-star general serving as commander of the Kosovo Security Force (KSF) since November 30, 2021, appointed by President Vjosa Osmani. He was promoted to the rank of lieutenant general on December 13, 2021. He is the son of Rifat Jashari and nephew of Adem Jashari.

== Early life and Prekaz ==
Jashari was born in the village of Prekaz, in the municipality of Skenderaj, Kosovo. He is a member of the extended Jashari family of Prekaz and the son of Rifat Jashari. He survived the March 5–7, 1998 Attack on Prekaz, an event widely documented by human-rights organizations; other survivors included his cousin Besarta Jashari.

== Kosovo Protection Corps ==
After the war and the KLA’s demilitarization, Jashari served in the Kosovo Protection Corps (KPC). By 2006 he was commander of the KPC’s Drenica (Zone One) command, as noted by the International Crisis Group, which cited his role in internal planning and community security during the 2004 unrest.

== Kosovo Security Force ==
Jashari joined the Kosovo Security Force following its establishment and on November 30, 2021, was appointed KSF commander by President Osmani after the resignation of Lt. Gen. Rrahman Rama. He was promoted to lieutenant general on December 13, 2021. In office he has represented the KSF in bilateral and multilateral defense engagements, including meetings with KFOR and Euro-Atlantic partners.

== See also ==
- Rifat Jashari
- Adem Jashari
- Kosovo Security Force
