= Glogovac attack =

1993 incident in Yugoslavia

- Part of the Prewar period
Date	22, 23 or 25 May 1993
Location	Drenas, Autonomous Province of Kosovo and Metohija, FR Yugoslavia
Result	KLA victory: Hashim Thaçi is charged with 10 years in absentia

Belligerents
Kosovo Liberation Army	FR Yugoslavia: Serbian Police (MUP)

Commanders and leaders
Hashim Thaçi; Adem Jashari; Ilaz Kodra	Unknown

Casualties and losses
None	4-5 killed 2 wounded

The Glogovac attack was an armed confrontation in May 1993, where the Kosovo Liberation Army (KLA) ambushed Serbian police. This attack is considered the first armed engagement by the KLA. The incident was carried out by Hashim Thaçi, also known as "The Snake," who later became one of the leaders of the Kosovo Liberation Army.

As a result, Hashim Thaçi was later pursued by the Ministry of Internal Affairs of the Republic of Serbia, according to Articles 551 and 554 of the Criminal Procedure Code and the order of the District Court in Pristina, K-37/97. He was sought for the purpose of serving a 10-year prison sentence in absentia.

== Background ==
=== Formation of the Kosovo Liberation Army (KLA) ===
The Kosovo Liberation Army (KLA) was established in the early 1990s as a paramilitary organization with the primary aim of achieving Kosovo's independence from Yugoslavia. It was composed mainly of ethnic Albanians who were dissatisfied with the treatment of Kosovo Albanians under Yugoslav and Serbian rule. The KLA emerged during the crisis in Bosnia, forming as a small radical group in late 1992 and early 1993. Initially, it consisted mostly of a few Kosovar Albanians who were members of an activist radical leftist organization from the early 1980s known as the Levizja Popullore e Kosovës (LPK), or the People's Movement of Kosovo. The LPK consistently advocated for Kosovo's independence and resisted Serbian control.

The KLA initially engaged in low-intensity guerrilla warfare, targeting Serbian police and military forces in Kosovo. Over time, the organization gained support from the Kosovo Albanian diaspora and other sympathizers, which helped in securing funds, weapons, and volunteers.

== Incident ==
In May 1993, a politically motivated attack took place in Drenas, carried out by the Kosovo Liberation Army (KLA) under the leadership of Hashim Thaçi and his associates. Concealed gunmen ambushed a police vehicle, resulting in the deaths and injuries of several Serbian policemen.

== Aftermath ==
The Serbian government condemned the attack as an act of terrorism. Hashim Thaçi, the leader of the KLA, was held responsible for the attack and sentenced to 10 years in absentia.

=== Casualties and injuries ===
According to authors like Mijajlović, the KLA is reported to have killed 5 Serbian police officers and injured 2 during the attack. However, other sources, such as those from the Western European Union, claim that the attack resulted in 2 police officers being killed and 5 others injured. A later source, a 2007 article by author Rathfelder in the German newspaper ZEITUNG, which covered Hashim Thaçi's biography, stated that the KLA under Thaçi's command had killed 4 Serbian police officers.
