= Ahmet Delia =

Albanian guerilla fighter

- Born: c.1850 Prekaz, Vilayet of Kosovo, Ottoman Empire (modern Kosovo)
- Died: 1913; Prekaz, Kingdom of Serbia (modern Kosovo)
- Occupation: Guerrilla fighter
- Known for: Participation in the League of Prizren; Armed resistance against Serbian army in 1913

Ahmet Delia (1850-1913) was an Albanian guerilla fighter and member of the League of Prizren during the Albanian National Awakening. Born in Drenica, Prekaz, Kosovo (back then Vilayet of Kosovo, Ottoman Empire) his father, Deli Prekazi, was one of the founders of the League. Ahmet Delia became active early during the Albanian war of resistance against the invading Serbian army in 1912.

== Fighting in Prekaz ==
Ahmet Delia became one of the most important figures of the Albanian struggle for freedom when he defended a house in Prekaz that was being attacked by Serbian forces in 1913. A group of 13 Serb soldiers had entered the village and begun looting, burning and killing Albanian civilians. Ahmet Delia, aged 63 at the time, spotted the soldiers as they forced the neighbor Halil and his family on the yard.

When Delia heard the women and children crying he decided to take action and approached the house. He called on his son Mursel and the village chieftain, Rame Islami, and together they approached the soldiers. Delia lacked proper weapons and armed himself with an axe whilst the other two took up spades. When Delia entered the yard the other two blocked the door, cutting off the Serb soldiers and allowing Delia to fatally wound the vanguard. The Serb soldiers, alarmed by the sudden ambush, decided to try and surround Delia only to be ambushed by Mursel in turn, killing them and arming himself with their rifles which he then turned on the rest of the unit.

Delia continued to swing his axe against the Serb soldiers whilst Mursel and Rame overran those that converged on Delia. One soldier managed to shoot Delia, injuring him, but was almost immediately overpowered by Mursel who choked the soldier to death. The fight ended with 12 dead Serbian soldiers leaving only Jovan Radosavljevic as the sole survivor of the unit, who attempted to flee but was captured by Rame shortly afterwards. Delia spared Jovan's life and ordered the release of the soldier to deliver a message to then king of Serbia, Petar Karađorđević, of the fate that awaited anyone attempting to occupy Albanian lands. Delia succumbed to his injuries hours later and the village was repeatedly attacked later that year.

During the Kosovo War of 1998, Serbian forces burned down the majority of the village.
