= Xhemail Abria =

Wise old man from Drenica

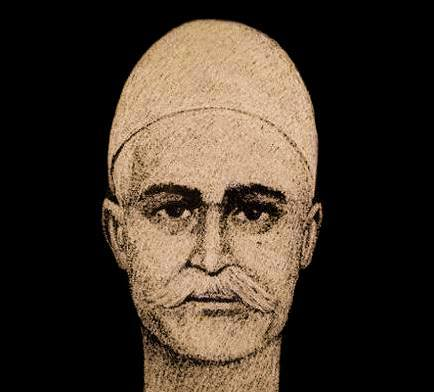
Xhemail Abria

Xhemail Abria (1830–1908) was a Kosovar wise old man and intellectual born in Abria village, Drenica region, Kosovo.

== Background ==
He was the son of Sefer Kuçi. Educated at home as a youth, he worked as a shepherd. Though self-taught, he was precocious and participated in the popular education of the time.

== Career ==
He was awarded the title Pleqnar i Kosovës ("Elder of Kosovo") at the Junik Assembly of 1877 and raised his profile by attending the inaugural meeting of the League of Prizren in 1878. He represented Drenica at the subsequent meeting, presided over by Binak Alia, where the Karanarme decree was signed. Alia later passed the chairmanship on to Abria. In addition, he participated in the 1899 Assembly of Peć (held near what is now Deçan) and Deli Prekazi's Drenica revolt in 1903.

== The People's Genius ==
Xhemail Abria was known by three surnames: Abria (from his birthplace, known in Albanian as Abria e Epërme), the honorific Aga, and Seferi (from his father). Rising from illiteracy to a connoisseur's understanding of the philosophy, history, and geography of the Albanian people, he was given the sobriquet of Gjeniu i Popullit ("The People’s Genius").

An apocryphal example was his response to a query from a village elder named Rexhë Hyseni from Belo Polje, near what is now Istok. The man asked Abria to solve a thorny dispute between two local clans over a family gravesite too old to otherwise identify. Abria suggested the following, akin to a crude version of modern DNA analysis:

Exhume one of the dead and get a bone from therein. Summon one man from each family and obtain a drop of blood from each. Put each drop on the bone and see which one is absorbed into the marrow, awarding the site to that drop’s bloodline.

== Quotes ==
- Fjala n`kamë nuk peshon rand! (“Words have no weight standing (so sit)!”)
- Ma pive kafen e ftoftë! (“I drank cold coffee!”)
- Gratë s`um dulen po i pashë! (“I can’t stand women, I see them!”)
- Mos e kapërce masën as për t`mirë, as për t`keq! (“Do not overdo anything, for good or for ill!”)
- Burri e ka burrninë n`tre kat! (“The man’s manhood is three floors high!”)
- Dikush vdes pa hi n`dhe! (“Someone can die without being buried!”)
- Nuk vnohet perça n`krye t`huej! (“There is no boundary between his mind and another’s!”)
- Fjalën e pleqnarit dhe armën e trimit s`ka kush si i nalë! (“There is nothing like the words of elders and the weapons of the brave!”)
- Asht zor m`e ba anmikun mik, se mikun anmik e ban kur t`dush! (“It is hard to make an enemy a friend, while a friend can be made an enemy anytime you like!”)
- Dy pipa dalin prej ni cungu...! (“Two branches come out of a stump!”)
- Me hasmin duhet me i mat fjalët se preket! (“With your enemy, you must measure the effect of your words!”)
- Tri sene s`duhet me i keshë: vllaun e keq, gruan e keqe e kojshin e keq! (“You shouldn’t laugh all three of the following: a bad brother, a bad wife, and bad neighbors”)
- Katër sende nuk mund me mi fsheh askush: diturinë dhe budallakun, pasurinë dhe fukarallakun! (“There are four things nobody can hide from me: wisdom and foolishness, wealth and poverty!”)
- Hoxhë, kno ma shpesh n`qitape, se dijenia pa hyzmet asht si llamba pa gaz, që nihere jep pak dritë, e dikur shymet krejt! (“Said to an imam: speak more often, knowledge without wisdom is like a lamp without oil, it may burn briefly but extinguishes once purchased!”)

== Bibliography ==
- Bajrami, Xhemail (2010). Xhemail Abria – Pleqnar i Kosovës. Pristina: Koha.
- Çeta, Anton (1990). Prozë popullore nga Drenica, vol. II. Pristina: Enti i teksteve dhe i mjeteve mësimore i Krahinës Socialiste Autonome të Kosovës.
- Greiçevci, Riza (2012). Kështu ka thanë Xhemail Abria. Pristina, 2012.
- Kadishani, Jetish (1988). Fjalë të urta dhe shprehje popullore. Klina: Klubi letrar "Jehona e Dukagjinit."
- Nushi, Pajazit (1984). "Mendimi i pleqnarve dhe struktura e tij." Gjurmime albanologjike: folklor dhe etnologji. Pristina: Albanological Institute of Pristina.
- Rukiqi, Mehmet (1998). Krijues dhe bartës të tregimeve popullore në Drenicë. Pristina: Albanological Institute of Pristina.
