= Siege of Prekaz (1991) =

Encirclement of the Jashari house by Serbian Police

- Part of the Yugoslav war and Kosovo prewar period
Date	30 December, 1991
Location	Prekaz, Serbia, Yugoslavia
Result	Jashari Family victory: Prekaz declared a no-go area by Yugoslav authorities

Belligerents
(Republic of Kosova) Jashari Family	SFR Yugoslavia

Commanders and leaders
(Republic of Kosova) Adem Jashari (Republic of Kosova) Hamëz Jashari	(Socialist Federal Republic of Yugoslavia) Unknown

Strength
(Republic of Kosova) 6 militants and a mob of Albanians	(Socialist Federal Republic of Yugoslavia) Convoy with armored vehicle's and helicopters

Casualties and losses
3 villagers wounded	(Socialist Federal Republic of Yugoslavia) unknown

The siege of Prekaz was an encirclement of the Jashari family house on December 30, 1991, by heavily armored Serbian Militia. Their goal was to capture or kill Adem Jashari, who had committed several acts of sabotage against the Yugoslav administrative apparatus in Kosovo.

== Background ==
In late 1990, the People's Movement of Kosovo (LPK) and Albanian President Ramiz Alia agreed to train volunteers from Kosovo in the hope of starting an armed uprising. The volunteers received strict instructions to avoid detection by Yugoslavia's secret police (UDBA). They first flew to Zürich, then Trieste, and finally boarded a boat to Durrës. On October 1, 1991, a group of 53 volunteers began 30 days of military training in the village of Surrel, near the Albanian capital. A second, more diverse group, including members from Kosovo and Macedonia such as Adem Jashari, Sahit Jashari, Murad Jashari, Fadil Kodra, and Ilaz Kodra, arrived on November 1. Plans for a third group were thwarted by Yugoslav authorities. On December 2, Adem Jashari, with 33 armed men, crossed the border back into Kosovo.

== Siege ==
The day before the initial siege, Adem Jashari received a call from a trusted friend warning him of an approaching MUP convoy with armored vehicle's and helicopters. In response, Adem and his brother Hamëz gathered four friends and relatives and sought refuge in the neighboring village of Kodra. Believing it was safe, Adem and Hamëz returned home in the early hours of December 30, but they were met with gunfire from Serbian policemen. During the ensuing shootout, a mob of both armed and unarmed Albanians converged on the Jashari home, effectively breaking the siege and forcing the MUP unit to retreat and subsequently declare Prekaz a "no-go area".

== Aftermath ==
On January 22, 1998, Serbian police besieged the Jashari house for a second time. The fighting lasted for half an hour until the police were repelled by KLA fighters. Two of Adem Jashari's nieces, Iliriana and Selvete, were wounded.
