= Bekim Jashari =

Kosovan politician

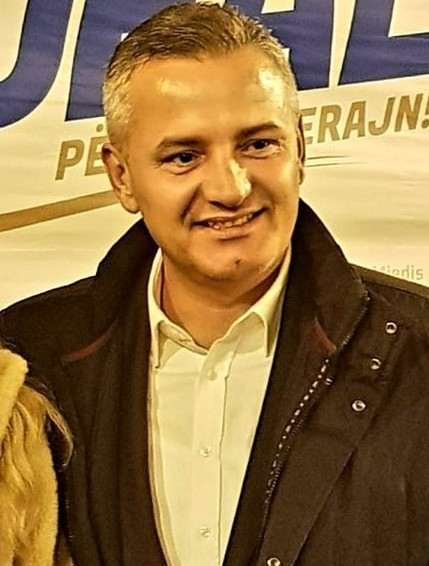
- Bekim Jashari, 2021

Mayor of Skenderaj
- In office 22 October 2017 – 30 November 2021
- Preceded by: Sami Lushtaku
- Succeeded by: Fadil Nura

Personal details
- Born: 28 January 1975 (age 51) Gornje Prekaze, SR Serbia, SFR Yugoslavia
- Citizenship: Kosovan; Albanian
- Party: Independent List "Bekim Jashari" (2021–2023)
- Other political affiliations: Independent (until 2021)
- Spouse: Shehrije Jashari (m. 1998)
- Children: 4
- Parents: Hamëz Jashari (father); Feride Jashari (mother)
- Relatives: Besarta Jashari (sister); Adem Jashari (uncle)
- Education: University of Pristina

Bekim Hamëz Jashari (born 28 January 1975) is a Kosovan former politician who served as mayor of Skenderaj in Kosovo from 22 October 2017 to 30 November 2021.

== Early life and career ==
Jashari was born on 28 January 1975 in village Prekaz i Epërm of Skenderaj, in a family with national traditions and intellectual values, as leaders of Albanian education in Skenderaj. He was the first child of the couple Hamëz and Feride.

As the grandson of teacher Shaban, education has been primary in the formation of the Bekim. He finished primary and secondary school in Skenderaj. With the completion of secondary school, in 1992 the political situation in the region had become unstable.

Jashari's opportunities for university education had diminished and his stay in Kosovo as the son of the political resistance ideologue Hamëz Jashari posed a danger. Consequently in July 1993, he with the blessing of father Hamëz, took the path of exile. Bekim was placed in Munich, Germany to the Uncle Rifat, who, in addition to the work on which the well-being of the family in Kosovo depended, took on the burden of caring for the offspring of the three branches Murat, Lulzim and he from the Shaban Jashari's trunk.

During his stay in exile, Bekim as the son of Jashari family was systematically informed about the situation in Kosovo and the political and military developments there, so for Bekim and the Jashari family, the "Epopee of the Kosovo Liberation Army" was conditionally expected, which was a spark of freedom that left Bekim's family home in March 1998 during the Attack on Prekaz, where most of his family members were killed, and spread throughout Kosovo.

But during his stay in Germany, Bekim was not limited to the situation and political activity. Throughout his stay in the host country he continued to be educated, professionally trained, and to work diligently in the largest automotive corporation, BMW. Undoubtedly the synergy of intellectual and family work values, with the strong values of education and work in Germany greatly influenced Bekim's approach later in his career.

=== Mayor of Skenderaj ===
Jashari announced he would run for Mayor of Skenderaj in the 2017 local elections in the summer of that year. Skenderaj had been run by the Democratic Party of Kosovo since the end of the Kosovo War, but in respect to the Jashari family, the Democratic Party did not put forward a candidate. Jashari was elected mayor on 22 October 2017 winning 85.5% of votes.
