= Fadil Nura =

Kosovan politician (born 1979)

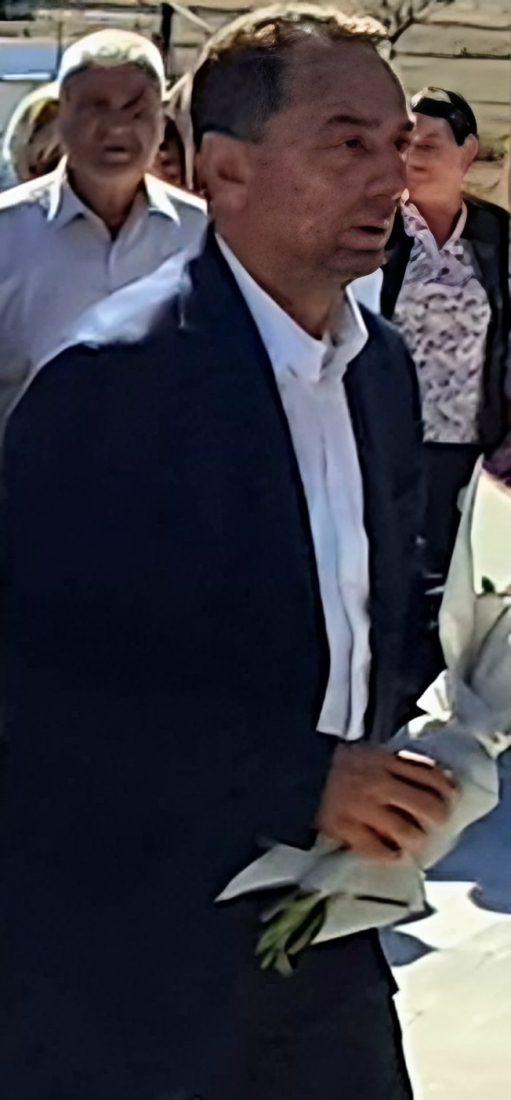
- Nura during the commemoration of the martyrs in Tërnac, 2025

Mayor of Skenderaj
- Incumbent
- Assumed office 2 November 2021
- Preceded by: Bekim Jashari

Member of the Assembly of the Republic of Kosovo
- In office 19 November 2020 – 2 November 2021

Personal details
- Born: 4 March 1979 (age 47) Prelloc, SAP Kosovo, SR Serbia, SFR Yugoslavia
- Party: Democratic Party
- Children: 2
- Education: University of Pristina

Military service
- Political representative: Kosovo Liberation Army

Fadil Nura (born 4 March 1979) is a politician in Kosovo. He was a member of the Assembly of the Republic of Kosovo from 2020 to 2021 and has been the mayor of Skenderaj since 2021. Nura is a member of the Democratic Party of Kosovo (PDK).

== Early life and career ==
Nura was born to a Kosovo Albanian family in the village of Prelloc in the municipality of Skenderaj, in what was then the Socialist Autonomous Province of Kosovo in the Socialist Republic of Serbia, Socialist Federal Republic of Yugoslavia. He graduated from the University of Pristina's Faculty of Law in 2005 and earned a master's degree from the same institution in 2008. From 2008 to 2010, he was director of Skenderaj's administrative and staff department.

== Politician ==
Nura was deputy mayor of Skenderaj from 2011 to 2014 and was the municipality's acting mayor from 2014 to 2017. He was a deputy minister of justice in the government of the Republic of Kosovo from 2018 to 2019.

=== Parliamentarian ===
Nura received the sixty-second position on the PDK's electoral list in the 2019 Kosovan parliamentary election. Parliamentary elections in Kosovo are conducted under open list proportional representation, and he finished in eighteenth place among the list's candidates. The list won twenty-four seats, and Nura would have been elected had the assembly mandates been assigned solely on the basis of votes received. Due to a requirement for one-third female representation, however, he did not initially receive a seat.

He was awarded an assembly mandate on 19 November 2020 as a replacement for party leader Kadri Veseli, who resigned from parliament after being indicted for war crimes and crimes against humanity in the Kosovo War. The PDK served in opposition during this period.

Nura finished in sixteenth place among the PDK's candidates in the 2021 parliamentary election and was re-elected when the party list won nineteen mandates. Vetëvendosje won the election, and the PDK continued in opposition. Nura was a member of the committee for oversight of public finances and the committee on agriculture, forestry, rural development, environment, spatial planning, and infrastructure.

=== Mayor of Skenderaj ===
Nura ran against incumbent Skenderaj mayor Bekim Jashari, an independent politician, in the 2021 Kosovan local elections. During the campaign, Nura said that the PDK had refrained from fielding a candidate against Jashari in the previous 2017 Kosovan local elections and that he himself had supported Jashari's candidacy. He added, however, that Skenderaj had stagnated under Jashari's leadership and that the municipality now needed "protectionism, not dilettantism." He defeated Jashari in the first round of voting. After winning the mayoral election, Nura resigned from the Republic of Kosovo assembly on 2 November 2021.

In September 2023, Nura announced that Skenderaj had laid the foundation stone for a memorial on the location where the Kosovo Liberation Army (KLA) appeared publicly for the first time.

== Electoral record ==
=== Local (Skenderaj) ===
2021 Kosovan local elections: Mayor of Skenderaj
Candidate	Party	Votes	%
Fadil Nura	Democratic Party of Kosovo	13,123	57.89
Bekim Jashari (incumbent)	Independent List Bekim Jashari	9,236	40.74
Sokol Haliti	Civic Initiative "For Skenderaj"	311	1.37
Total		22,670	100.00
