= Prekaz i Epërm =

Prekaz i Epërm Горње Преказе Gornje Prekaze
- Village
- Location within Kosovo
- Coordinates: 42.782274°N 20.828980°E
- Location: Kosovo
- District: Mitrovica
- Municipality: Skenderaj
- Elevation: 674 m (2,211 ft)

Population (2024)
  - Total: 1,707
- Time zone: UTC+1 (CET)
  - Summer (DST): UTC+2 (CEST)

Prekaz i Epërm (Albanian definite form: Prekazi i Epërm; Serbian Cyrillic: Горње Преказе / Gornje Prekaze) is a village in Skenderaj municipality, Kosovo. This village was the site of the battle that started the Kosovo War, the Battle of Prekaz and birthplace of KLA leader Adem Jashari and his brother, Hamëz Jashari.

== History ==
According to Rifat Jashari in an interview the village of Prekaz was founded by three brothers, Jashar, Kadri and Meha in the late 1700's. Each would create their own street and family. The fourth family of Prekaz, Lushtaku, would come to the village later.

During the 20th century, the village of Prekaz played a role in many events in local history, including being the site of several attacks and battles. In 1913, during the Second Balkan War, a group of Serbian soldiers entered the village, ransacking it as well as assaulting the local population. However, they were attacked by a group of three Albanian irregulars led by Ahmet Delia who, wielding an axe, killed all but one of the soldiers; Ahmet later died of his wounds as a result of the incident.

The village also played an important role during the Drenica uprising of 1945 where clashes broke out in the village, resulting in its annexation by Albanian insurgents.

The home of the Meha family in the village was surrounded during the 1981 protests in Kosovo after Tahir Meha fired upon Yugoslav police in Srbica. Yugoslav forces would attack the Meha household, which was protected by Tahir and his father Nebih, leading to fierce fighting breaking out. Despite destroying a Yugoslav tank with a hand grenade, the two insurgents were killed and their house was destroyed.

=== Kosovo War ===
The village marks one of the founding locations of the Kosovo Liberation Army (KLA), with its two generals, Adem and Hamëz Jashari being from the village. A convoy of Yugoslav troops unsuccessfully attempted to besiege the Jashari family in 1991 during the Prewar period.

Yugoslav forces would attempt once again to attack Prekaz in 1998 during 22-23 January 1998, however they were once again forced to retreat by the KLA, despite the absence of Adem Jashari.

In March 1998, Yugoslav forces attacked Prekaz for a third time after a police station was allegedly attacked by KLA militants. The attack was a Yugoslav success, leading to the deaths of all 22 militants present there, including Adem Jashari.

On 26 March 1998, Yugoslav forces ambushed KLA general Ilir Lushtaku near Prekaz, killing him.

Some Albanian sources also mention a battle in Prekaz on 29 March 1999, when Yugoslav forces re-entered the village to raid. However they were pushed back by KLA forces.

== Tourism ==
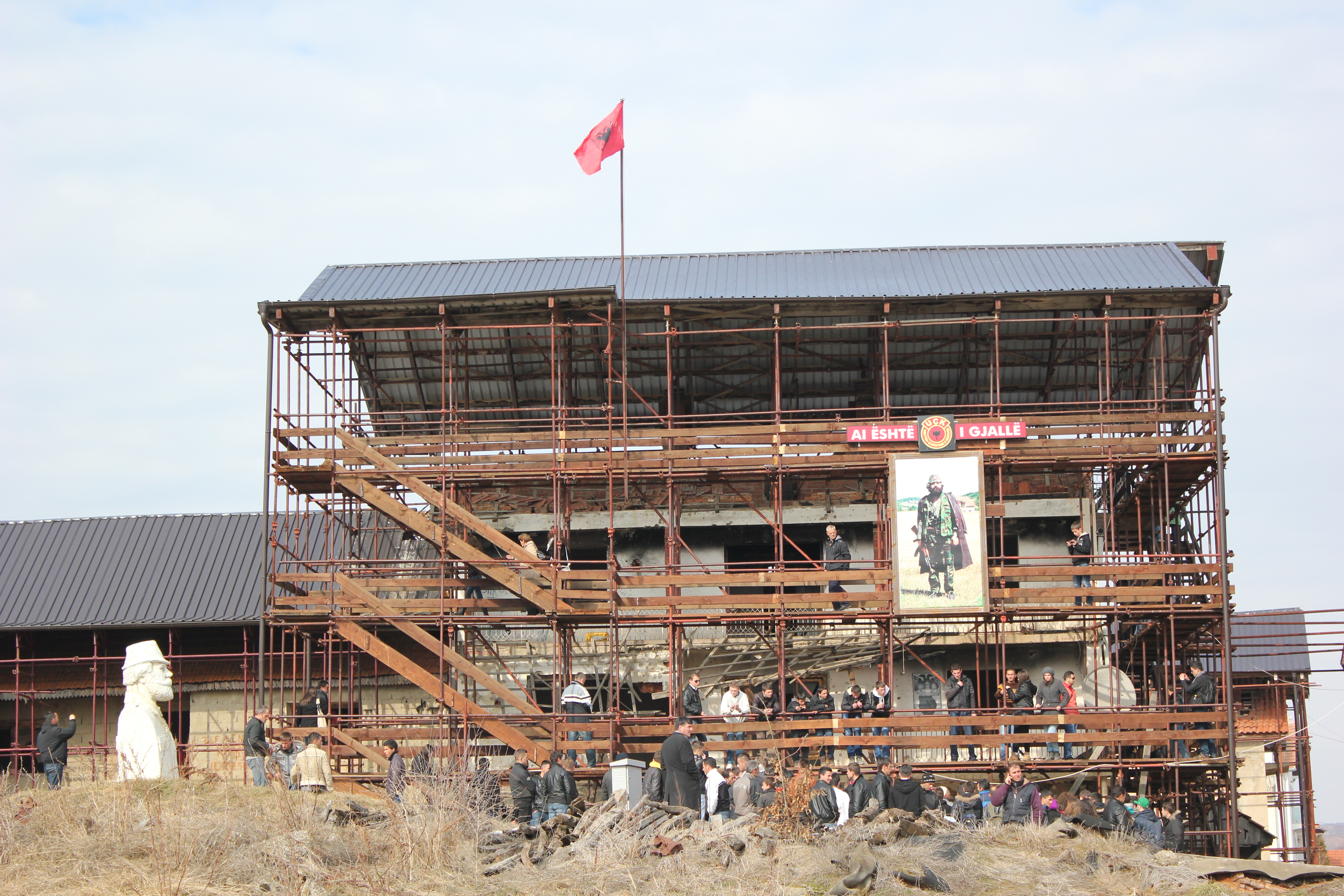
House of Adem Jashari in Prekaz

The most visited location in Prekaz is the Adem Jashari Memorial Complex, a cultural heritage site which consists of the graves of the Jashari family, the destroyed Jashari house, a statue of Adem Jashari and a museum. The location holds a special cultural festival that happens during the anniversary of the Attack on Prekaz each year, called "Night of the flames".

== Notable people ==
- Adem Jashari- general and "father" of the KLA.
- Hamëz Jashari- KLA general and brother of Adem Jashari.
- Shaban Jashari- KLA general and father of Hamëz and Adem Jashari.
- Tahir Meha- Albanian irregular known for attacking Yugoslav police in 1981.
- Nebih Meha- Father of Tahir Meha.
- Ahmet Delia- Albanian freedom fighter known for attacking Serbian soldiers while armed with an axe in 1913.
- Bekim Jashari- Albanian politician and former mayor of Skenderaj.
- Rifat Jashari- Albanian public figure.
- Ilaz Kodra- KLA general
- Avdyl Kodra- KLA commander
- Ilir Lushtaku- KLA commander
- Sami Lushtaku- Mayor of Skenderaj and KLA commander
- Bashkim Jashari- KLA soldier and Kosovar military officer
