= Adem Jashari Memorial Complex =

Cultural heritage monument of Kosovo

Coordinates: 42°45′15.4″N 20°48′20.1″E

- Kompleksi Memorial Adem Jashari (Albanian)
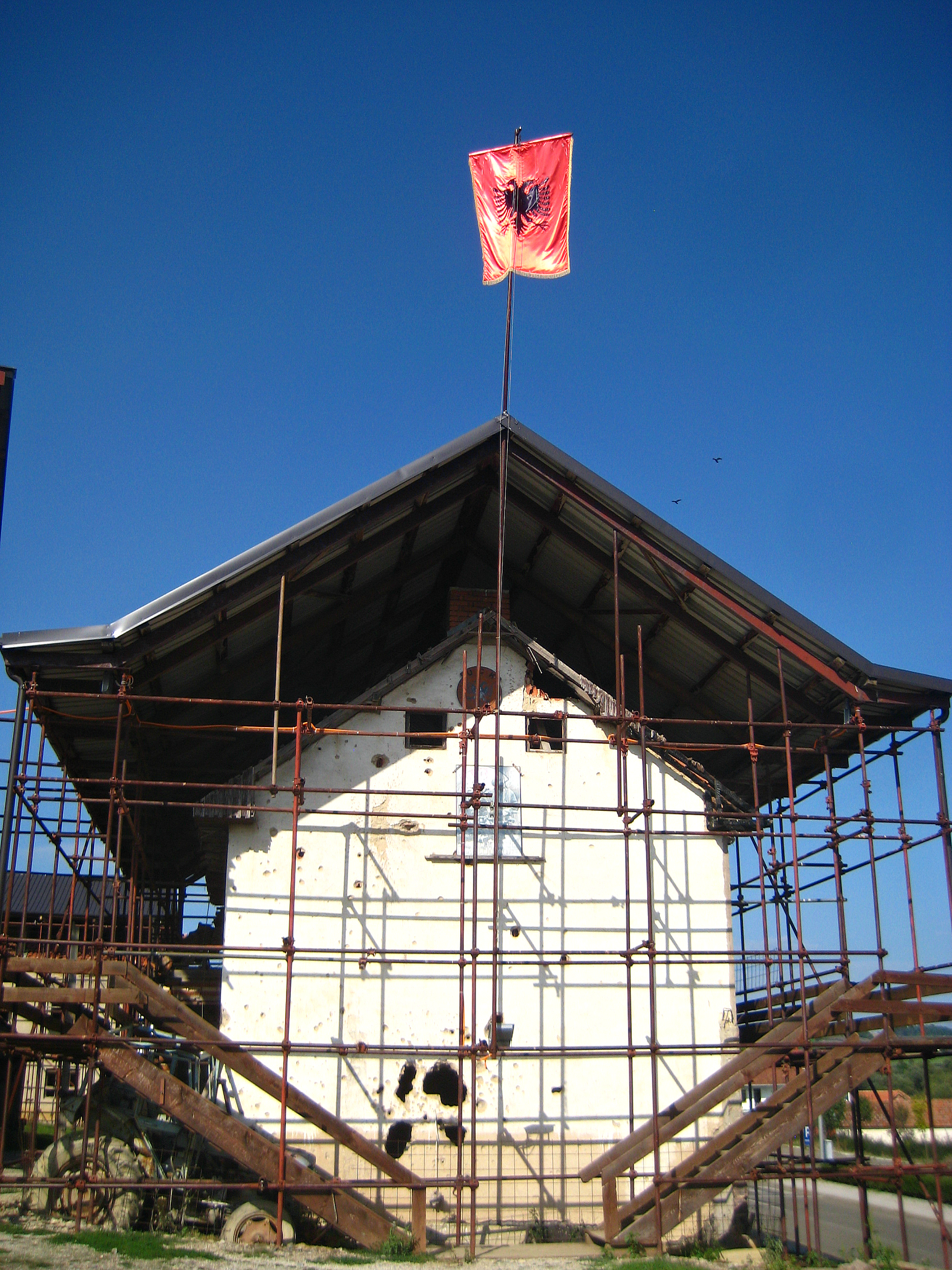
- Interactive map of Adem Jashari Memorial Complex
- Location: Prekaz i Epërm, Skenderaj, Kosovo

History
- Built: March 1998

Cultural Heritage under Permanent Protection
- Official name: Kompleksi Memorial "Adem Jashari"
- Type: Architectural Heritage: Monument/Ensemble
- Part of: 124/2023 - Special Protection Zone (SPZ)
- Reference no.: 3494

The Adem Jashari Memorial Complex (Albanian: Kompleksi Memorial Adem Jashari) is a memorial complex in Prekaz i Epërm, Skenderaj, Kosovo. It is categorized by the government as "Architectural" and was built in honor of the family and life of the Kosovo Liberation Army fighter Adem Jashari, killed in action during the Kosovo War on March 7, 1998, during what was later known as the Attack on Prekaz.

== Description ==
The location includes both the houses and graves of several soldiers from the Jashari family. Therefore, it was placed under national heritage protection by the Assembly of the Republic of Kosovo. The graves of Shaban, Hamëz, and Adem are guarded by Sentinels from the Kosovo Security Force.

== Gallery ==
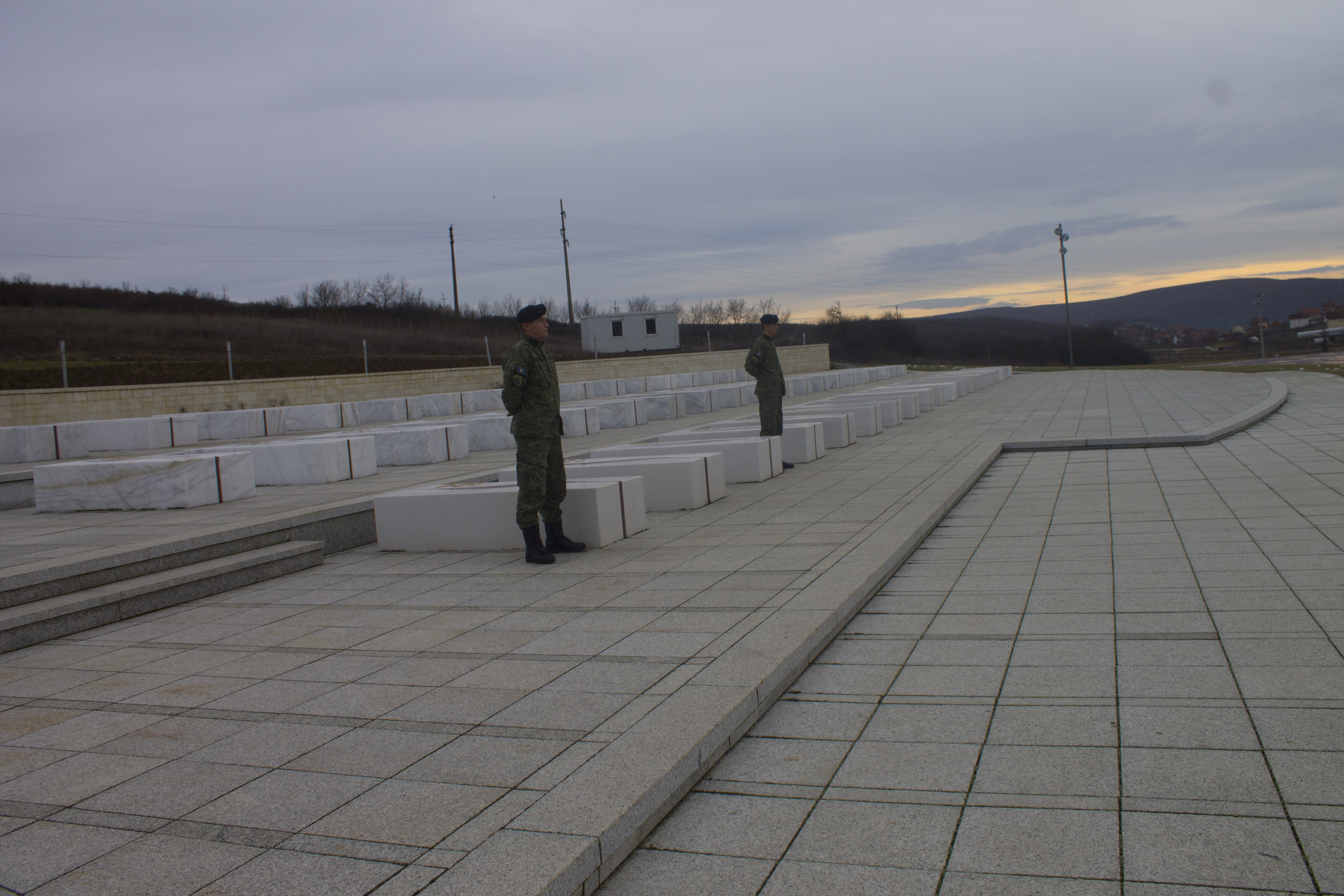
Soldiers guarding the tombs

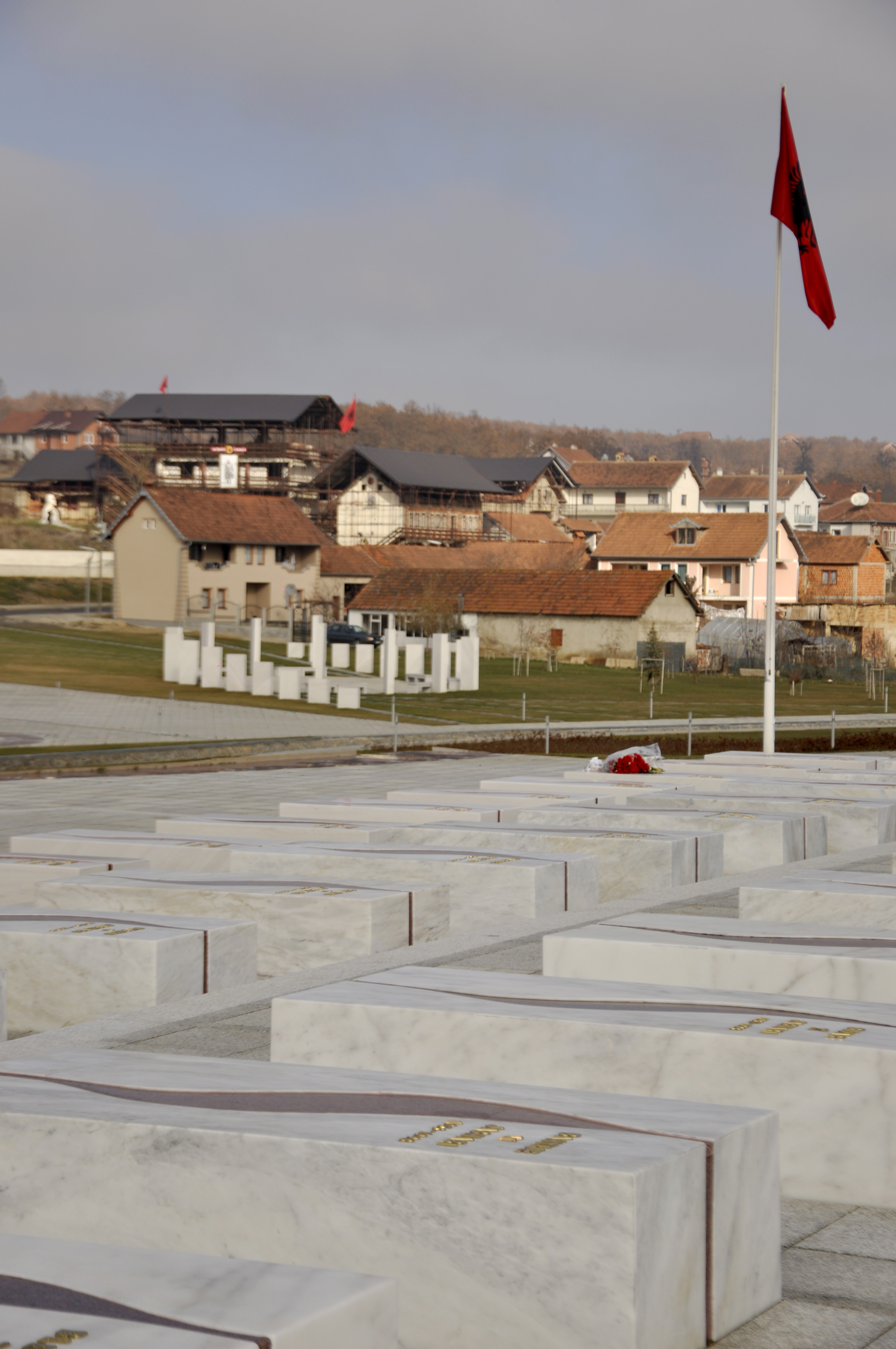
Photo of the Complex by Arben Llapashtica

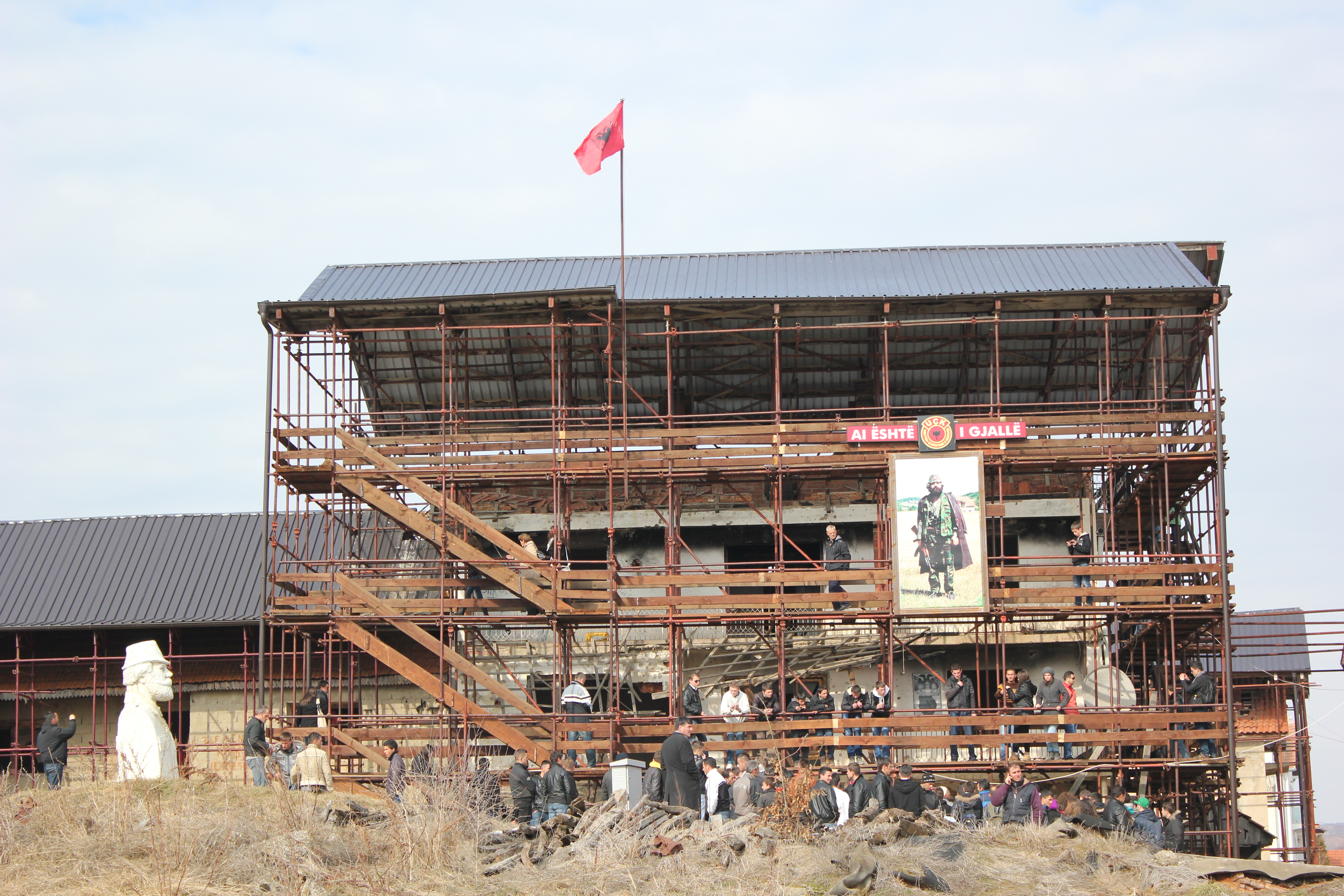
Extended view
