= Drenica =

Coordinates: 42°33′31″N 20°48′45″E

- Historical region of Kosovo
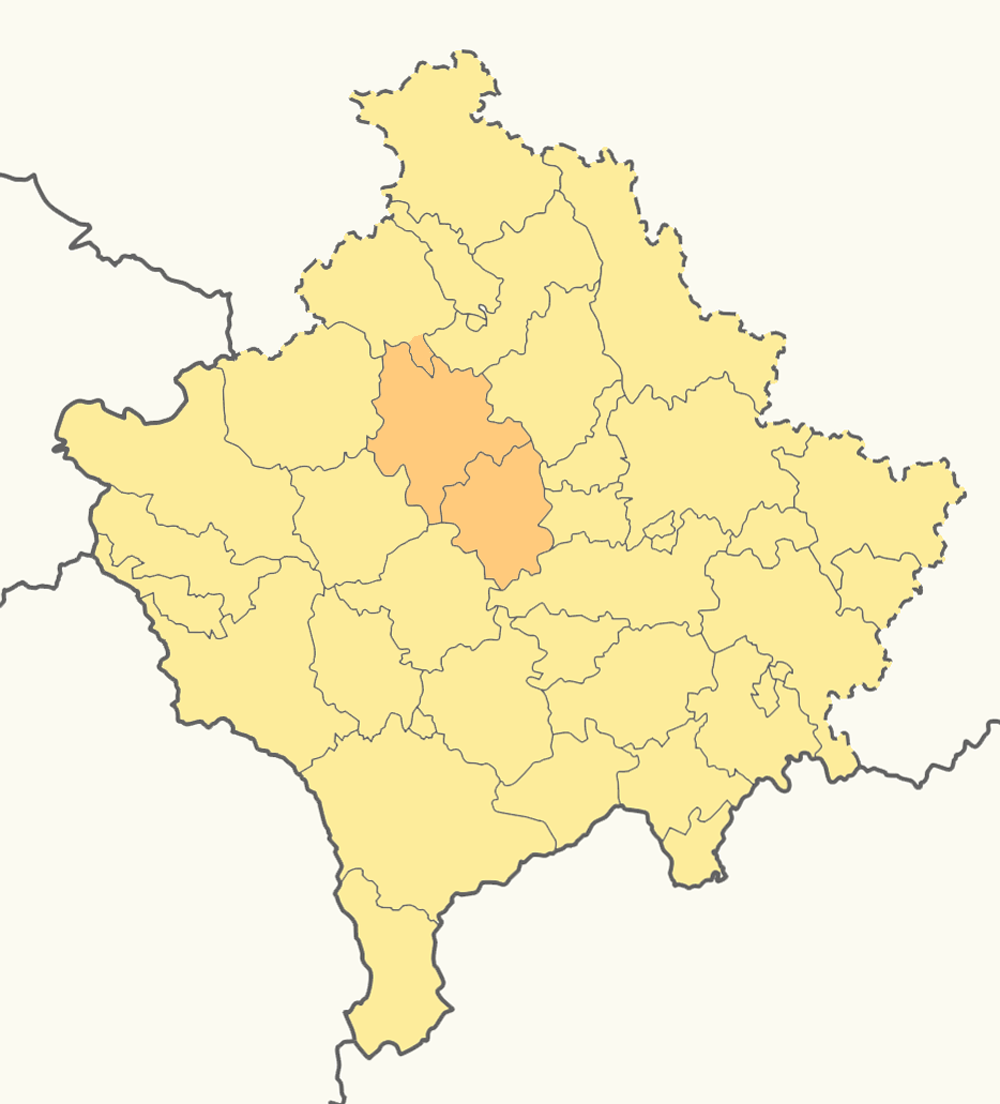
- Country: Kosovo
- Municipalities: Drenas; Skenderaj

Area
  - Total: 668 km^{2} (258 sq mi)

Population (2011)
  - Total: 109,389
  - Density: 164/km^{2} (424/sq mi)

Drenica (Albanian indefinite form: Drenicë, Serbian Cyrillic: Дреница), also known as the Drenica Valley, is a hilly region in central Kosovo, covering roughly around 700 square kilometres (270 sq mi) of Kosovo's total area (6%). It consists of two municipalities, Drenas and Skenderaj, and several villages in Klina, Zubin Potok, Mitrovica, Istog, and Vushtrri It is located west of the capital, Pristina.

According to the 2011 Census, the population of the region is 109,389, excluding the surrounding villages. Albanians form the absolute majority of the region.

== Geography ==
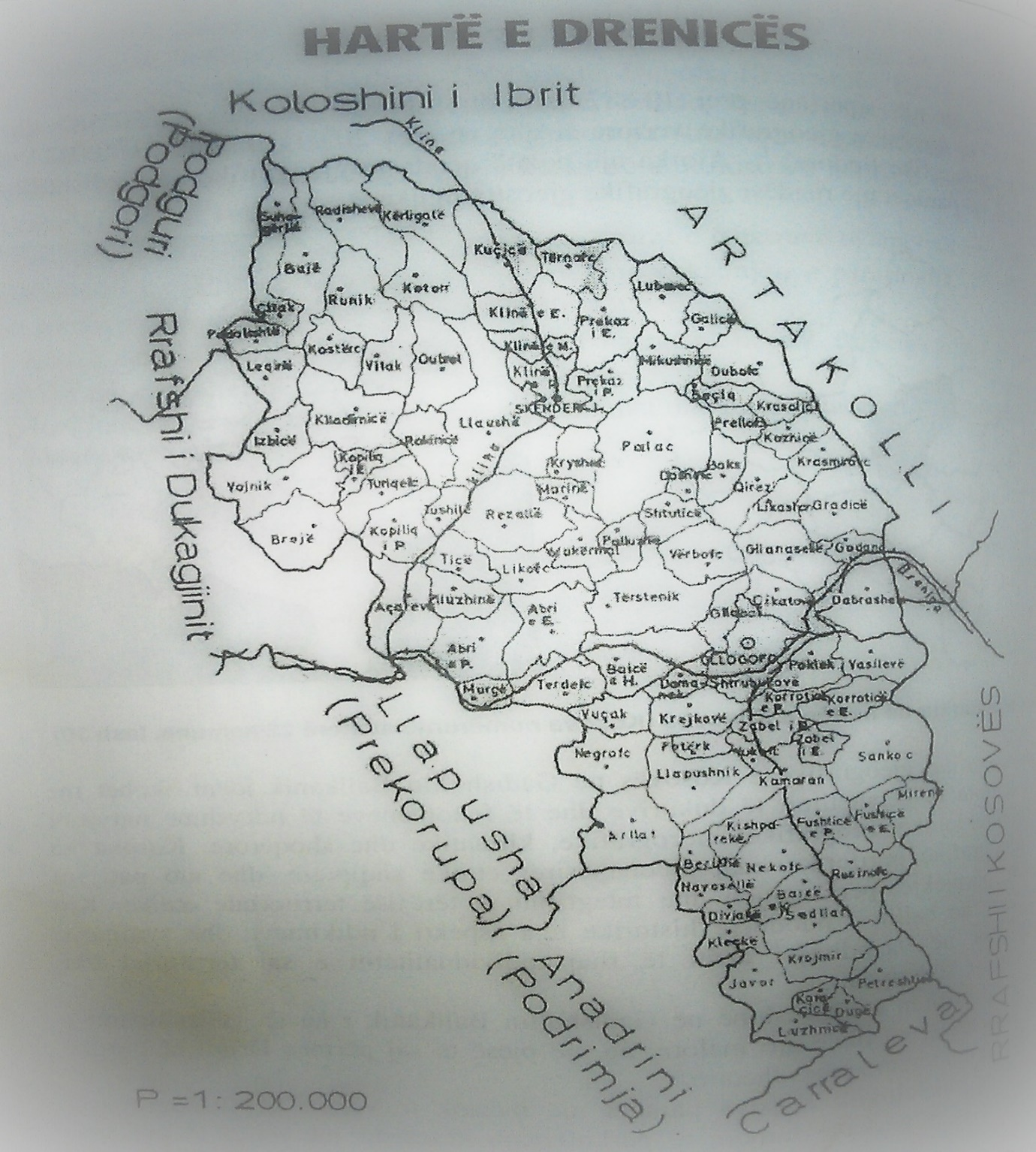
Geographic location of Drenica

Drenica is located in the center of what is today Kosovo, in the western part of the region itself of Kosovo. Artakolli i Çyçavicës once also belonged to Drenica but was separated from foreign invaders of the region. It is sometimes regarded as a region in its own right. Drenica is divided into Upper Drenica, also called Red Drenica and Lower Drenica, also called Pasha's Drenica. The highest mountains in the region are Mount Caraleva (1,177m) and Mount Çiçavica (1,091m).

== History ==
=== Middle Ages ===
Between 1246 and 1255, Stefan Uroš I had reported Albanian toponyms in the Drenica valley. A chrysobull of the Serbian Tsar Stefan Dušan that was given to the Monastery of Saint Mihail and Gavril in Prizren between the years of 1348–1353 states the presence of Albanians in Metohija, the vicinity of Prizren and in the villages of Drenica. Albanian toponyms such as Arbanaski Potok are mentioned in the region in a document older than the years of 1253-1254.

Draškovina was the name of a medieval Serbian župa (county) that included parts of Metohija and northern Drenica. The area of Kosovo, including Drenica, was part of Vuk Branković's territory during the fall of the Serbian Empire. Drenica was first mentioned as a župa at the end of the Middle Ages. It was mentioned in 1413, when Đurađ Branković, his mother Mara, and brothers Đurađ and Lazar, endowed the village of Dobroševce to the Monastery of Saint Paul of Mount Athos. Despot Đurađ Branković (1427–1456) founded the Devič monastery in the region. There were many Serbian Orthodox monasteries besides Devič in Drenica, so it was often called the second Serbian Holy Mountain. During the Ottoman period, the monastery of Devič was protected by local Albanian Muslims on whose territory Devič was situated on.

=== Interwar Period ===
During the Interwar Period, disaffected Kosovar Albanians formed a 'Committee for the National Defence of Kosovo' in Shkodër in 1918, their main demand being the unification of Kosovo with Albania. A general revolt started, known as the Kachak (outlaw) movement, led by Azem Galica, against the incorporation of Kosovo into Yugoslavia. Fighting blew up in Drenica, Galica's home territory. Yugoslav Kingdom troops moved into Drenica and wounded Galica who later died as a result. His death dealt a mortal blow to the Albanian armed resistance against Yugoslav military presence in Kosovo, which he had led for the previous eight years. The end of the major Kacak resistance came when Yugoslav government helped Ahmed Zogu to return to power in Tirana in December 1924, in exchange for his suppressing the Committee for the National Defence of Kosovo.

=== World War II ===
During World War II, Drenica was among the many regions of Kosovo where Serb settlers were subjected to persecution by Albanian paramilitaries, including expulsions and murders. The Drenica Uprising of 1945, in which the Albanians of Drenica resisted Yugoslav control after the Yugoslav partisans committed many atrocities against the locals, began on 22 January and ended on 18 February. This began when 75 well-known Drenica Albanians were killed by having their heads bashed in by sledgehammers, and were then thrown into a large ditch – the whole Drenica region, at this time numbering around 35,000 inhabitants, rose in revolt as a result of these actions in a bid for freedom. The Drenica uprising was sustained by over 6,000 men. The Drenica region was surrounded by 12–15 partisan brigades, which comprised 36,000–50,000 Serbs, Montenegrins, Bulgarians and Albanians. The fighting lasted for 28 days, and 430 Drenica fighters were subsequently killed or wounded. Over 150 homes were looted or burnt down, and around 6,000 inhabitants of Drenica, Vushtrri and Mitrovica were deprived of food and all of their belongings. Partisan casualties numbered to 2,550 dead, 6,000 wounded and 850 prisoners captured. On the 18th of February, on the final day of fighting, the main commanders of the uprising fell in battle – they were Shaban Polluzha, Miftar Bajraktari, Mehmet Gradica and Gani Llaushi. Due to the death of these important commanders, and the lack of ammunition, the Drenica uprising crumbled.

=== Kosovo War ===
The villages surrounding the towns of Drenas and Skenderaj were the birthplace of the ethnic Albanian separatist Kosovo Liberation Army (KLA) and a stronghold of Albanian nationalism. By 1997, Albanians had begun to refer to Drenica as "liberated territory" because of the local KLA presence. The government considered Drenica a hotbed of "Albanian terrorism." Drenica was a KLA stronghold throughout and prior to the Kosovo War, and saw many armed conflicts against the security forces of FR Yugoslavia. It was also a safe place for refugees coming from other parts of Kosovo. In 1998, Serb police and military launched a campaign in Drenica that terrorised the local population and culminated with the Attack on Prekaz against the Jashari family. Serb forces killed 80 Albanians, of which 25 were women and children, and former Serbian president Milan Milutinović commended the massacre.

The Yugoslav army and paramilitary units used the Feronikel plant near Drenas as a base for operations during the war. Before the war, the factory produced nickel and ore. After the Albanian workers were laid off or expelled, it was also used as a barracks and a fire base, in which cannons and rockets were fired against KLA positions.

== Culture ==
The gradual development of animistic and pagan beliefs in certain stages of ancient Balkanic culture would result in the formation of mountain cults – particularly forest cults – which survived in Albanian culture as evidence of past pagan Balkanic beliefs. The forms in which it survived include the holding of a kuvend (meaning ‘convention’ in the Albanian Kanun) – which functioned as a regulated form of parliament in Albanian society – in certain places like Lisi i Kullës (tree of the Kulla) and Murrizi (Hawthorn) in Obri of Drenica, and Lisi i Gjatë (the tall tree) in Kotorr, and Gjashtë Lisat (six trees) in Likoshan of Drenica. There are several Thaçi tribal families in the Drenica region.

== Notable people ==
- Adem Jashari, co-founder of the KLA
- Ahmet Delia, League of Prizren fighter
- Avni Spahiu, diplomat, former television director
- Azem Galica, main Kachak leader
- Shote Galica, Kachak, Heroine of Albania
- Bekim Jashari, former mayor of Skenderaj, son of Hamez Jashari
- Don Xhoni, Albanian rapper and songwriter
- Gashi (rapper), American rapper and songwriter
- Hamëz Jashari, Commander in the KLA, Hero of Kosovo
- Hasan Prishtina, Albanian politician and eighth Prime Minister of Albania
- Hashim Thaçi, former Head of the KLA, former president of Kosovo
- Iljaz Prokshi, Albanian writer and poet
- Jakup Krasniqi, former Acting President of Kosovo, former chairman of the Assembly of Kosovo
- Haradin Bala, former KLA commander (nickname "Shala")
- Leonora Jakupi, Albanian singer and songwriter
- Rifat Kukaj, Albanian writer
- Shaban Polluzha, main Ballist Commander in Kosovo during WW2
- Tahir Meha, Albanian political activist and patriot
- Bilall Dreshaj, Albanian Military Commander in WW2, fought in the battle of Novi Pazar
- Sylejman Selimi, former KLA, KPC and KSF Commander, ambassador of Albania
- Fadil Nura, mayor of Skenderaj
- Izet Ibrahimi, Albanian politician, former mayor of Drenas
- Përparim Hetemaj, Albanian footballer
- Mehmet Hetemaj, Albanian footballer
- Xhemajl Abria, Albanian intellectual, "Elder of Kosovo"
- Bedri Hamza, politician and mayor
- Flora Brovina, former vice President
- Kaqusha Jashari, politician
- Ylli Sallahi, Albanian footballer
- Ibrahim Gashi, historian and politician
- Amir Rrahmani, Albanian footballer
- Mergim Vojvoda, Albanian footballer
- Florian Loshaj, Albanian footballer
