= Adem Jashari =

Commander of the Kosovo Liberation Army (1955–1998)

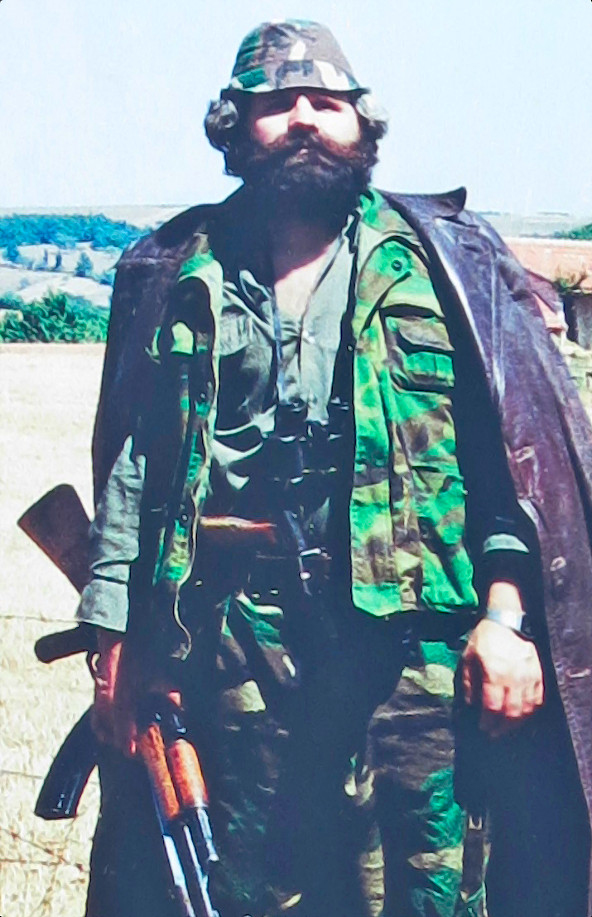
- Born: Fazli Jashari; 28 November 1955; Prekaz, FPR Yugoslavia
- Died: 7 March 1998 (aged 42); Prekaz, FR Yugoslavia
- Burial place: Adem Jashari Memorial Complex, Prekaz
- Spouse: Adilje Jashari
- Children: Kushtrim; Fitim; 3 other children
- Relatives: Shaban Jashari (father); Hamëz Jashari (brother); Rifat Jashari (brother); Bekim Jashari (nephew); Besarta Jashari (niece)
- Military career
- Allegiance: Albania; Kosova
- Branch: Kosovo Liberation Army
- Service years: 1991–1998
- Rank: Commander
- Commands: Drenica region
- Conflicts: Prewar period: • Siege of Prekaz (1991) • Glogovac attack Insurgency in Kosovo (1995–1998); Kosovo War: • Attacks on Likoshane and Çirez (WIA) • Attack on Prekaz †
- Awards: Hero of Kosovo; National Flag Decoration
- Memorials: Adem Jashari Memorial Complex

Adem Shaban Jashari (born Fazli Jashari; 28 November 1955 – 7 March 1998) was one of the founders of the Kosovo Liberation Army (KLA), a Kosovo Albanian separatist militia which fought for the secession of Kosovo from Yugoslavia during the 1990s.

Beginning in 1991, Jashari participated in attacks against the Serbian police before travelling to Albania to receive military training. Arrested in 1993, he was released at the behest of the Albanian Army and later returned to Kosovo, where he continued launching attacks against the Yugoslav establishment. In July 1997, he was convicted of terrorism in absentia by a Yugoslav court; the trial was subsequently criticized by Human Rights Watch. After several unsuccessful attempts to capture or kill him, Serbian police launched an attack against Jashari's home in Prekaz in March 1998. The battle that followed resulted in the deaths of 57 members of Jashari's family, including that of Jashari, his wife, brother and sons.

Seen as the "father of the KLA", Jashari is considered a symbol of Kosovar independence by ethnic Albanians. He was posthumously awarded with the title "Hero of Kosovo" following its declaration of independence in 2008.

== Life ==
Adem Shaban Jashari was born on 28 November 1955, in the village of Prekaz, SFR Yugoslavia, as Fazli Jashari. Descended from Kosovo Albanian guerrillas who had fought Yugoslav forces decades prior, he was raised on Albanian war stories and was rarely seen without a gun. According to journalist Tim Judah, Jashari "hated the Serbs, and although he was one of the KLA’s early recruits, he was no ideological guerrilla." The earliest known attack against Serbian police by Adem Jashari dates back to Kosovo protests in 1989, where Hashim Thaçi stated that Jashari was "armed to the teeth" and threw Molotov cocktails at Serbian armored vehicles.

=== Guerrilla activities ===
Drenica is a hilly region in central Kosovo inhabited almost exclusively by Kosovo Albanians. Prior to the Kosovo War, the government of Yugoslavia considered it "the hotbed of Albanian terrorism." Jashari was a farmer. In 1991, he participated in an armed uprising against the Yugoslav authorities in Kosovo. During this period, a Kosovo Albanian irredentist organization that came to be known as the Kosovo Liberation Army first emerged.

From 1991 to 1992, Jashari and about 100 other ethnic Albanians wishing to fight for the secession of Kosovo from Yugoslavia underwent military training in the municipality of Labinot-Mal in Albania. Afterwards, Jashari and other ethnic Albanians committed several acts of sabotage aimed at the Serbian administrative apparatus in Kosovo. Attempting to capture or kill him, Serbian police surrounded Jashari and his older brother, Hamëz, at their home in Prekaz on 30 December 1991. In the ensuing siege, large numbers of Kosovo Albanians flocked to Prekaz, pressuring the police to withdraw from the village.

While in Albania, he was arrested in 1993 by the government of Sali Berisha and sent to jail in Tirana before being released alongside other Kosovo Albanian militants at the demand of the Albanian Army. With the Yugoslav forces now considering Prekaz a "no-go" area, Jashari launched several attacks over the next several years. These targeted the Yugoslav Army (VJ) and Serbian police in Kosovo. Jashari was convicted of terrorism in absentia by a Yugoslav court on 11 July 1997. Human Rights Watch subsequently described the trial, in which fourteen other Kosovo Albanians were also convicted, as "[failing] to conform to international standards." Pursuing Jashari for the murder of a Serb policeman, Yugoslav forces again attempted to assault the Jashari compound in Prekaz on 22 January 1998. With Jashari not present, thousands of Kosovo Albanians descended on Prekaz and again succeeded in pushing the Serbs out of the village and its surroundings. The next month, a small unit of the KLA ambushed Serbian policemen. Four policemen were killed and two were injured in the ensuing clashes. At dawn on 5 March 1998, the KLA launched an attack against a police patrol in Prekaz.

=== Death ===
In response to this attack, the Yugoslavs organized an operation involving tanks, APCs and helicopters. They were backed up by artillery from a nearby ammunition factory. With the intention of "eliminating the suspects and their families," the police attacked villages that had been identified as KLA strongholds, including Likošane and Ćirez. Human Rights Watch noted that "special police forces attacked without warning, firing indiscriminately at women, children and other noncombatants." KLA members and their families subsequently fled to Jashari's compound. Here, the police invited Jashari to surrender, giving him a deadline of two hours in which to respond. During this period, a number of families left the compound. Jashari remained, ordering his family members to stay inside and telling his militants to resist to the last man.

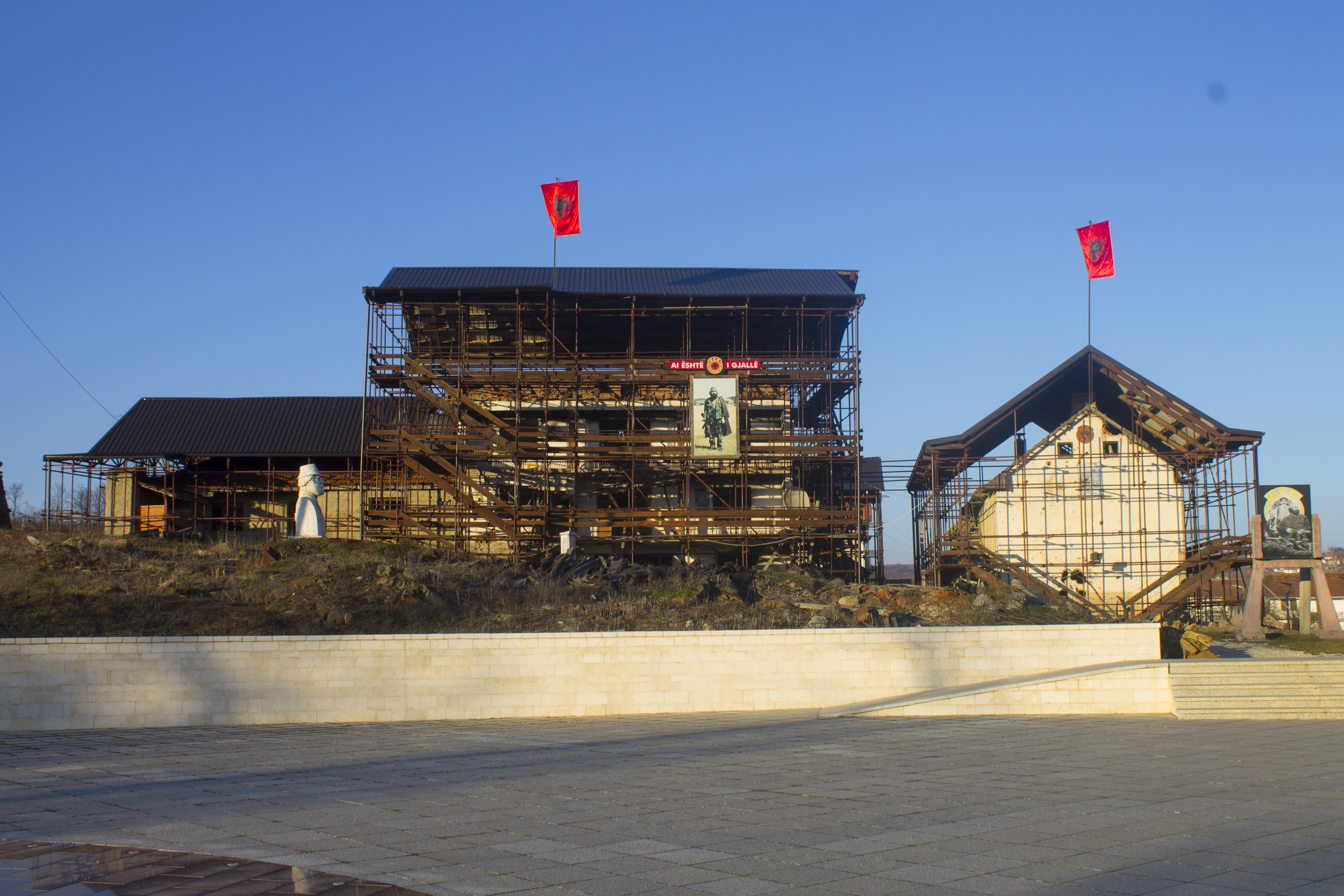
The Kulla and the house of Adem Jashari, where the Prekaz massacre took place

Once the two-hour deadline had expired, the two sides began exchanging gunfire. In one of the houses, where most of Jashari's extended family had gathered, a mortar shell fell in through the roof, causing many deaths. After a two or three-day siege, the police captured the Jashari compound. Once inside, they discovered that Jashari and his brother Hamëz had been killed. Also killed were Jashari's wife, Adilje, and his thirteen-year-old son, Kushtrim. Overall, approximately fifty-eight Kosovo Albanians were killed in the attack, including eighteen women and ten children under the age of sixteen. Goran Radosavljević, a major in the Serbian Interior Ministry, said that "[Jashari] used women, children and the elderly as hostages." Speaking of the attack, Yugoslav General Nebojša Pavković stated that it was "a normal policing action against a well-known criminal. It was successful. The other details I don't remember." The only survivor was Besarta Jashari, Hamëz Jashari's daughter. She claimed that the policemen had "threatened her with a knife and ordered her to say that her uncle (Adem Jashari) had killed everyone who wanted to surrender."

Following the military assault that destroyed the Jashari family compound, journalist Chris Hedges visited the ruins. He noted finding a charred volume among the debris containing a map of Greater Albania dating back to the 1878 League of Prizren era.

=== Aftermath ===
Soon after the attack against Prekaz, 46 bodies were taken to a hospital morgue in Pristina on 7 March before being returned to Skenderaj the next day. There, they were placed inside a warehouse located on the outskirts of town. Photographs taken during this time revealed that Jashari had received a bullet wound to the neck. On 9 March, the police publicly stated that they would themselves bury the bodies of those killed if they were not quickly claimed and buried by family members. The next day, the police dug a large grave near Donji Prekaz and buried the bodies of fifty-six people, ten of whom could not be identified. On 11 March, the bodies were disinterred by relatives and reburied in accordance with Islamic tradition on a field known as the "field of peace".

The shootout at the Jashari family compound involving Adem Jashari, a KLA commander and surrounding Yugoslav troops in 1998 resulted in the massacre of most Jashari family members. The deaths of Jashari and his family generated an international backlash against the Federal Republic of Yugoslavia. As news of the killings spread, armed Kosovo Albanian militias emerged throughout Kosovo, seeking to avenge Jashari's death as Albanians flocked to join the KLA. The event became a rallying myth for KLA recruitment regarding armed resistance to Yugoslav forces.

== Legacy ==
The exploits of Adem Jashari have been celebrated and turned into legend by former KLA members, some in government, and by Kosovar Albanian society resulting in songs, literature, monuments, memorials with streets and buildings bearing his name across Kosovo. Dubbed the "Legendary Commander" (Albanian: Komandanti Legjendar) by Albanians, Jashari is regarded by many in Kosovo as being the "father of the KLA". Portraits of him carrying an automatic weapon often adorn the walls of homes inhabited by ethnic Albanians. Considered a symbol of independence by Kosovo Albanians, the anniversary of Jashari's death is annually commemorated in Kosovo and his home has since been transformed into a shrine. The field where he and his family were buried has since become a place of pilgrimage for Kosovo Albanians, and several authors have equated Jashari with Albanian national hero Skanderbeg as well as Albanian kaçak rebels from the past.

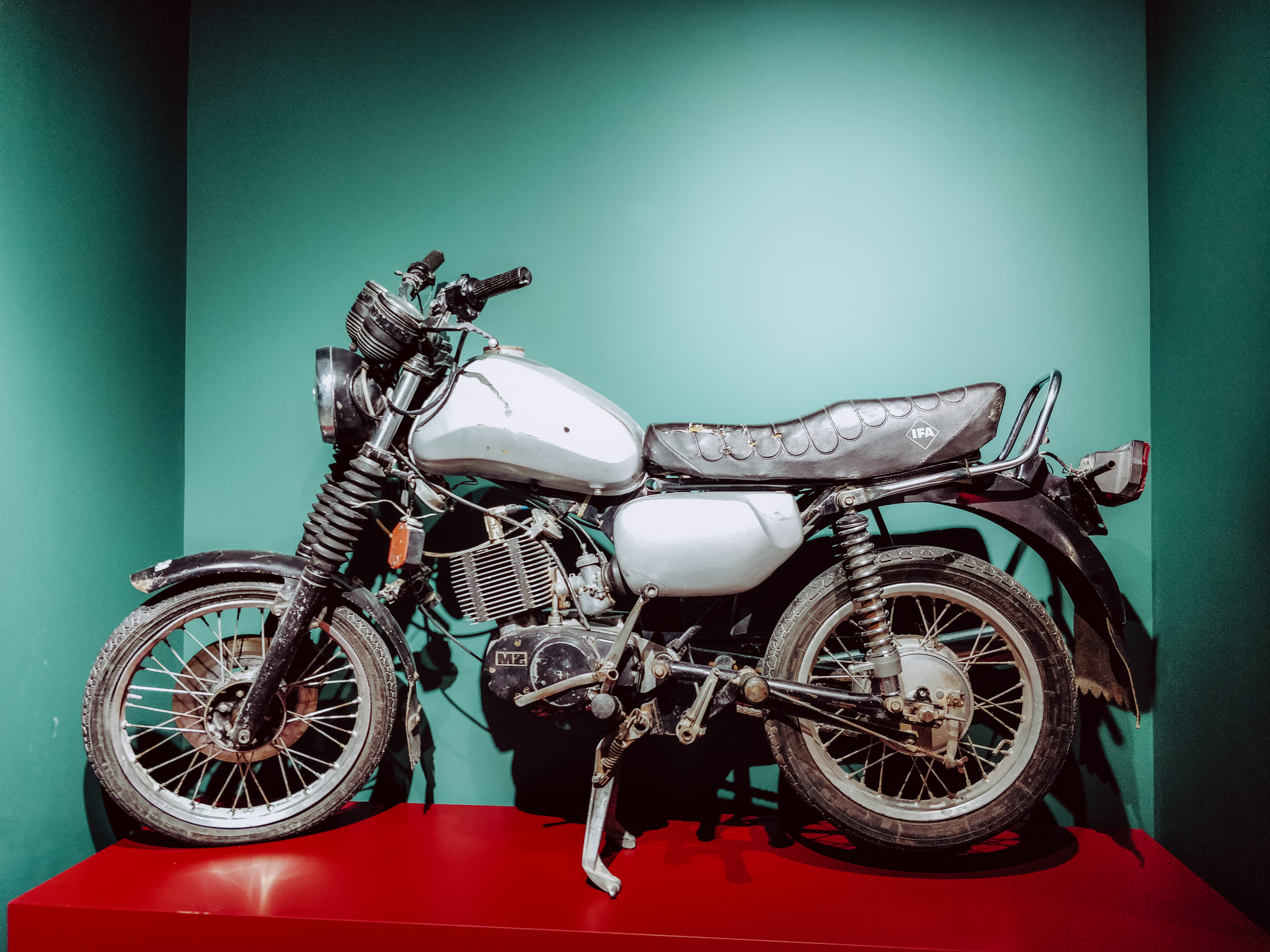
Adem Jashari's motorcycle, displayed at the Kosovo Museum. Sources indicate that he was particularly fond of motorcycles.

Following Kosovo's declaration of independence in 2008, Jashari was posthumously awarded the title "Hero of Kosovo" for his role in the Kosovo War. The olympic stadium in Mitrovica, the square near the old historic center of Prishtina and Kosovo's International Airport have also been named after him.

== See also ==
- Albanian nationalism (Kosovo)
- Adem Jashari Memorial Complex
