= Hamëz Jashari =

Kosovar soldier (1950–1998)

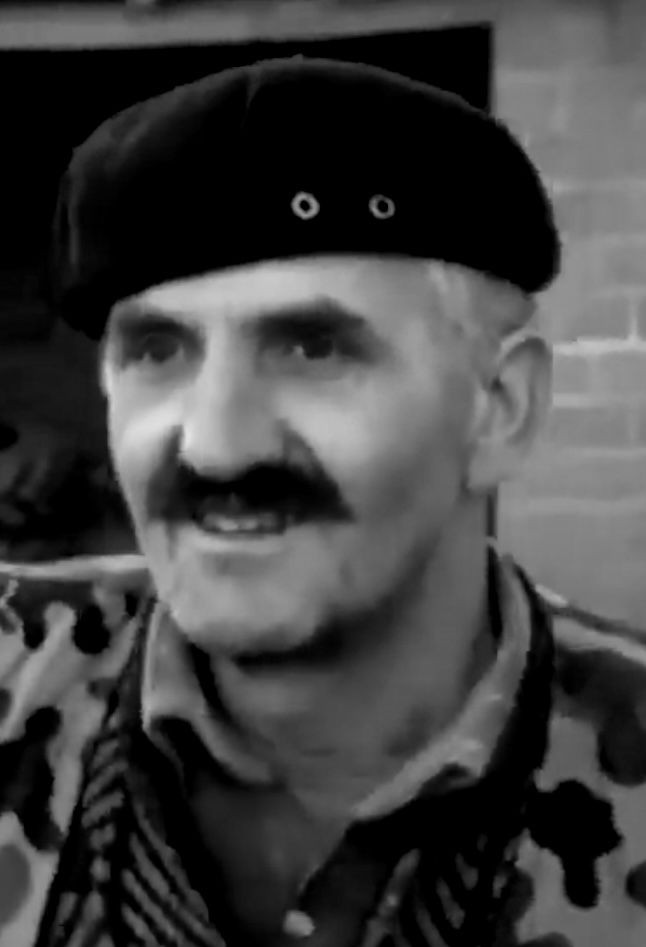
- Hamëz Jashari during a January 1998 interview
- Born: 19 February 1950; Prekaz i Epërm, Kosovo, FPR Yugoslavia
- Died: 7 March 1998 (aged 48); Prekaz i Epërm, Kosovo and Metohija, FR Yugoslavia
- Spouse: Feride Jashari
- Children: Bekim Jashari (Son), Besarta Jashari (Daughter)
- Relatives: Adem Jashari (Brother), Kushtrim Jashari (nephew)
- Military career
- Allegiance: Kosova
- Branch: Kosovo Liberation Army
- Service years: 1991–1998
- Rank: Commander
- Commands: Drenica region, Kosovo
- Conflicts: Siege of Prekaz (1991); Insurgency in Kosovo (1995–1998): • First Attack on Prekaz; Kosovo War: • Attack on Prekaz †
- Awards: Hero of Kosovo (2010)

Hamëz Jashari (Note: Albanian: Hamëz Jashari; Serbo-Croatian Latin: Hamaz Jašari) (19 February 1950 – 7 March 1998) was an Albanian commander and guerrilla fighter of the Kosovo Liberation Army. He was the brother of the well-known founder of the organization, Adem Jashari. Together, they fought against Yugoslav forces during the uprising from 1995 to 1998, leading up to the Kosovo War.

== Early life ==
Hamëz Jashari was born into a large Albanian family. His father was Shaban Jashari and his mother was Zahide Jashari.

Hamëz completed his primary education at the village school, attended secondary school in Skenderaj, and pursued studies at the higher economic school. He worked at the ammunition factory in Skenderaj and had a strong affinity for the arts, excelling in writing, drawing, theater, and music.

Hamëz was married to Feride Mecini from Klina e Epërme in Skenderaj, and together they had nine children. Despite opportunities to live abroad, including a brief stay in West Germany in 1973, Hamëz remained deeply rooted in Kosovo and dedicated to its cause. Along with Rifat, he traveled to Turkey to obtain pamphlets advocating for "Kosova Republic."

== Political activity ==
Hamez Jashari was a supporter and collaborated of the Democratic League of Kosovo since the early days of its founding in 1989 which he helped create. where he was placed as chairman of the Sub-branch Democratic League of Kosovo in Skenderaj. A few weeks later however, he resigned due to the Democratic League of Kosovo not accepting war as a means of liberation for Kosovo.

Hamza and his family still kept close contact with Ibrahim Rugova and his party until their deaths. Rugova sent him to Albania for military training from 1991-1992.

== Guerrilla warfare ==
=== Founding of the Kosovo Liberation Army ===
Flag of the Kosovo Liberation Army

Hamëz Jashari, alongside his brother Adem, was instrumental in the formation and operations of the Kosovo Liberation Army (UÇK). The UÇK was officially founded in the early 1990s as a response to increasing repression and violence against the Albanian population by Serbian authorities. Its mission was to resist Serbian rule and fight for the independence of Kosovo. Hamëz's deep knowledge of the local terrain and his leadership skills made him a formidable guerrilla commander.

On 30 December 1991, when the brothers were at home in Prekaz, the Serbian police surrounded them in an attempt to arrest them, but they managed to escape unharmed. This event marked the beginning of a series of attacks by Adem and Hamëz against the Yugoslav police.

Operating primarily in the Drenica region, the Jashari brothers led numerous attacks against Serbian police and military forces. Their tactics included ambushes, sabotage, and hit-and-run operations, aimed at disrupting the operations of the Yugoslav authorities and galvanizing support among the Albanian population. Hamëz's charisma and dedication inspired many young Kosovo Albanians to join the UÇK and take up arms against the Serbian regime. During the uprising of 1996-1997, the Kosovo Liberation Army, under the leadership of Hamëz Jashari and his comrades, killed approximately 121 Serbian policemen, leading to significant unrest in Kosovo.

Hamëz Jashari's commitment to guerrilla warfare and the cause of Kosovo's independence left an indelible mark on the region's history. His sacrifice and that of his family became a rallying point for the Albanian resistance, ultimately contributing to the international intervention that led to Kosovo's eventual declaration of independence. On 30 December 1991, when the brothers were at home in Prekaz, the Serbian police surrounded them in an attempt to arrest them, they managed to escape unharmed. Later, Adem and Hamëz started attacks against the Yugoslav Police.

Finally, on 5 March 1998, Prekaz was attacked by Yugoslav police forces. Adem and Hamëz Jashari and approximately 58 members of their family were killed, after the refusal of Adem Jashari and his brothers to surrender. The sole survivor of the attack was Hamëz's then 11-year-old daughter, Besarta.

In 2010 he received the order Hero of Kosovo by the president of Kosovo, Jakup Krasniqi.
