= Attack on Prekaz =

1998 military operation and war crime

Coordinates: 42°46′N 20°49′E

- Part of the Kosovo War and the Drenica massacres
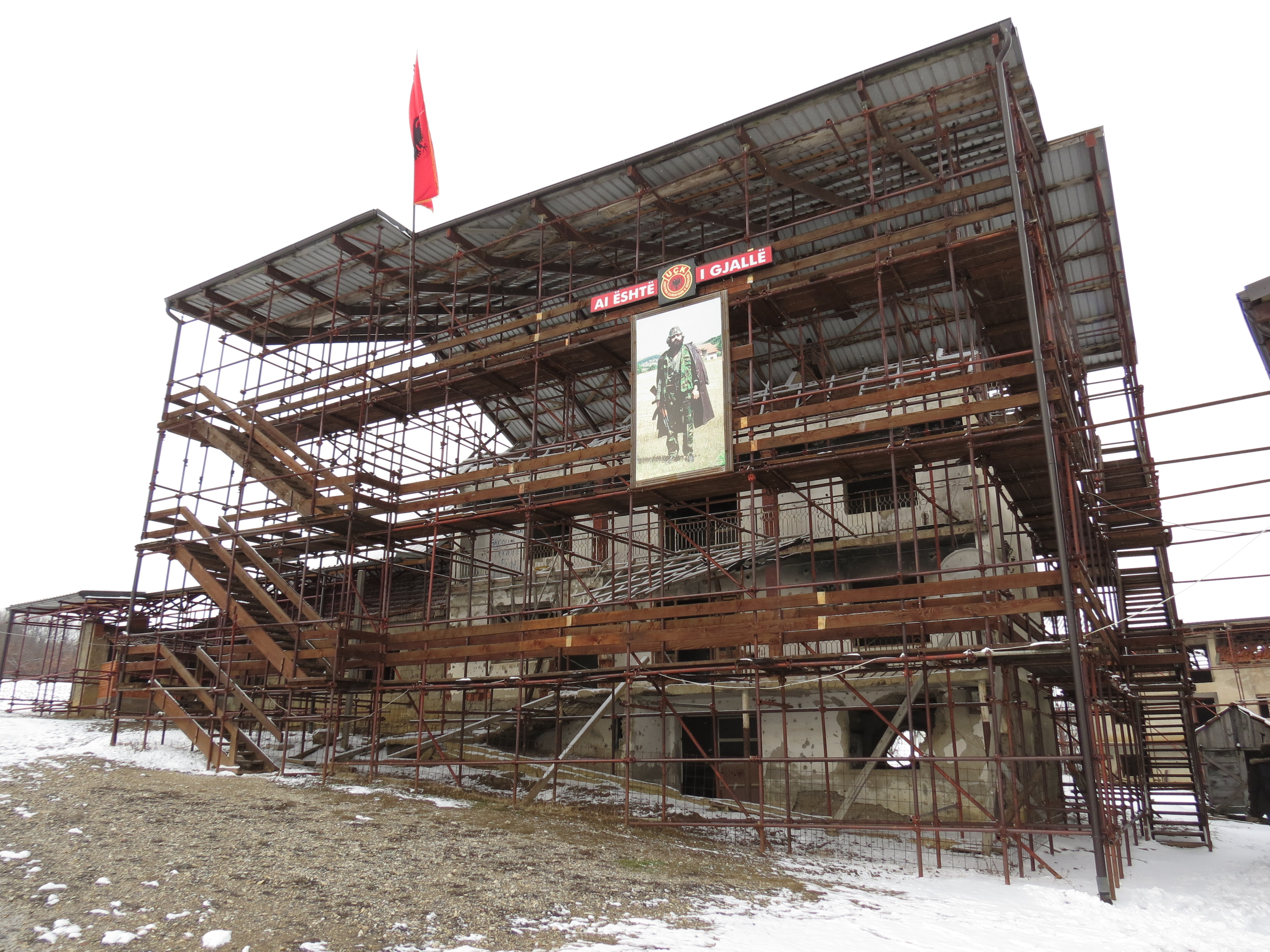
- The main house that was attacked by the Serbian police
Date	5–7 March 1998
Location	Prekaz, FR Yugoslavia (present-day Kosovo)
Result	Yugoslav victory

Belligerents
(Federal Republic of Yugoslavia) FR Yugoslavia	Kosovo Liberation Army

Commanders and leaders
(Federal Republic of Yugoslavia) Milorad Ulemek; (Federal Republic of Yugoslavia) Goran Radosavljević; (Federal Republic of Yugoslavia) Sreten Lukić; (Federal Republic of Yugoslavia) Vlastimir Đorđević	Adem Jashari †; Hamëz Jashari †; Shaban Jashari †

Units involved
(Federal Republic of Yugoslavia) Yugoslav Army; Serbian police Special Operations Unit; Special Anti-Terrorist Unit	Kosovo Liberation Army

Strength
(Federal Republic of Yugoslavia) c. 1,000+ policemen and special forces; at least one attack helicopter, several APCs, armoured vehicles, mortars and artillery	c. 22 militants

Casualties and losses
2 killed 7 wounded	c. 22 killed
- (Albania) 59 Albanians killed—mostly members of the Jashari family including 28 women and children below the age of 16, and at least three non-combatant adult males by summary execution (Albania) / (United Kingdom) One adolescent, a BBC journalist and an Albanian translator shot by police, but fled and survived (Albania) Up to 5,000 civilian refugees

The Attack on Prekaz, also known as the Prekaz massacre, was an operation led by the Special Anti-Terrorism Unit of Serbia which lasted from 5 to 7 March 1998, whose goal was to eliminate Kosovo Liberation Army (KLA) suspects and their families. During the operation, KLA leader Adem Jashari and his brother Hamëz were killed, along with nearly 60 other family members. The assault came two months after a smaller unsuccessful attack in January that year with the same objectives.

The attack was criticized by Amnesty International, which wrote in its report that: "all evidence suggests that the attack was not intended to apprehend armed Albanians, but to eliminate the suspects and their families." Serbia, on the other hand, claimed the raid was due to KLA attacks on police outposts. The attack and subsequent death of Jashari became an integral part of the local Albanian national narrative.

FR Yugoslav authorities considered this location to be a part of the hotbed of “Albanian terrorism". The operation was accompanied by use of at least three summary executions, and excessive and indiscriminate force by Serbian forces leading to excess (and intentional) non-combatant casualties.

== Background ==
Adem and Hamëz Jashari were members of the Kosovo Liberation Army (KLA), a militant group of ethnic Albanians that sought the independence of Kosovo from Yugoslavia. Adem Jashari was responsible for organizing the first armed political formation in Skënderaj, in 1991.

Pursuing Adem Jashari for the killing of a Serbian policeman, Serbian forces again attempted to assault the Jashari compound in Prekaz on 22 January 1998. On 28 February, a firefight erupted between Albanian militants and a Serbian police patrol in the small village of Likoshan. Four Serbian policemen were killed and several were injured. The KLA militants, one of whom was Adem Jashari, escaped. Subsequently, Serbian police killed thirteen people in a nearby household. Later that same day, Serbian policemen attacked the neighbouring village of Çirez and subsequently killed 26 Albanians. However, the Albanian militants managed to escape and the police decided to move in on Adem Jashari and his family. In the Drenica valley, Jashari decided to stay in his home and he instructed his fighters to stay there as well and resist to the last man.

== Operation ==
=== Yugoslav version ===
On 5 March 1998, the KLA launched another attack on a police patrol in Donji Prekaz, which caused the Serbian police to seek retribution, according to the official Serbian public report. After the second attack, the police prepared a brutal response for the Jasharis. They started hunting down local KLA militants who were forced to retreat to Jashari's compound in the same village.

Yugoslav policemen surrounded the group and invited them to surrender, while urging all other persons to clear the premises. The police further alleged that they gave them two hours to comply. Within the given deadline, dozens of civilians complied with the order and dispersed in safety from the stronghold. According to the police, after the two-hour deadline had expired, Adem Jashari, his brother and most of his family-members, however still refused to comply and remained inside the compound. After a tense verbal stand-off, according to official Serbian statements, Jashari's group responded by firing on the police using automatic weapons as well as mortars, hand grenades and snipers, killing two and injuring three policemen.

Goran Radosavljević, a major in the Serbian Interior Ministry, claimed that "Adem Jashari used women, children and the elderly as hostages...". Yugoslav Army General Nebojša Pavković stated that "It was a normal policing action against a well-known criminal. It was successful. The other details I don't remember".

=== Witness accounts ===
Witness accounts describe the police operation as well orchestrated which had included special police forces wearing camouflage and utilizing face paint, artillery shelling and armored personnel carriers. The police first attacked the Lushtaku family's compound which sat in between the Jashari family compound and a ammunition factory from where the police had their artillery. After the Lushtaku family fled, the police proceeded to attack the Jashari family compound.

Serbian soldiers had ordered the inhabitants of the Jashari compound to surrender or they would all be killed. When Qazim Jashari stepped outside with his hands up to surrender, he was killed immediately. Serbian soldiers also apprehended Nazim Jashari as he attempted to flee and extrajudicially executed him by firing several rounds into his back as he lay on his stomach.

During the attack, everyone in the house of Shaban Jashari except Besarta Jashari were killed. Among the dead were Shaban, Hamëz and Adem Jashari, along with their wives and children. Adem Jashari's 13 year-old son, Kushtrim Jashari, was the last to die as he took his father's rifle and shot at Serb soldiers.

On 6 March, police officers spotted a BBC journalist and an Albanian translator who were attempting to capture footage of the destruction of the Jashari compound. They were fired upon and took cover, but when attempting to flee they were fired upon again. The journalist was bruised when a bullet struck his phone and the translator was struck in the shoulder but was wearing a ballistic vest which prevented greater damage.

In the ensuing violence, the Yugoslav police killed nearly sixty people, including both Jashari brothers. The only survivor was Besarta Jashari, Hamëz Jashari's daughter. She claimed that the policemen had "threatened her with a knife and ordered her to say that her uncle (Adem Jashari) had killed everyone who wanted to surrender."

Evidence gathered later showed that the attack wasn't intended to apprehend of armed Albanian "militants"; rather, the attack was to eliminate them and their families. Other houses of Jashari family members were also attacked by the police as well as the residential compound of the Lushtaku family, home of Sami Lushtaku, the commandant of the KLA forces and his cousin, Ilir Lushtaku. In response, the UN security council turned to Chapter VII of the United Nations Charter without authorizing the final measure of the chapter which was military intervention.

=== Burial ===
The local Council for the Defense of Human Rights and Freedoms was contacted by the police to collect the bodies, but when the council requested documentation about the deceased none was made public. According to the council, the police had moved the corpses to a Pristina morgue before returning them to the Drenica area. On 9 March, the police warned that if the bodies weren't buried by their families they would be buried by the authorities, while the families requested autopsies to be performed.

On 10 March, the police got a bulldozer and dug a mass grave near Prekaz, and buried the bodies, ten of which were still unidentified at that time. Families had hoped that autopsies might be performed, but a group of doctors from Pristina, the families of the deceased, representatives from the Catholic Church, the Muslim community and international human rights organizations were denied access to the area. The heads of the Serbian police accused the organizations that they had smuggled weapons into the region in the past. On 11 March, the bodies were reburied according to Islamic tradition.

Forty-two individuals of Albanian ethnicity were confirmed to have died in Prekaz i Epërm during the operation. Six Albanians died in the nearby village of Llaushë under unclear circumstances.

== Aftermath ==
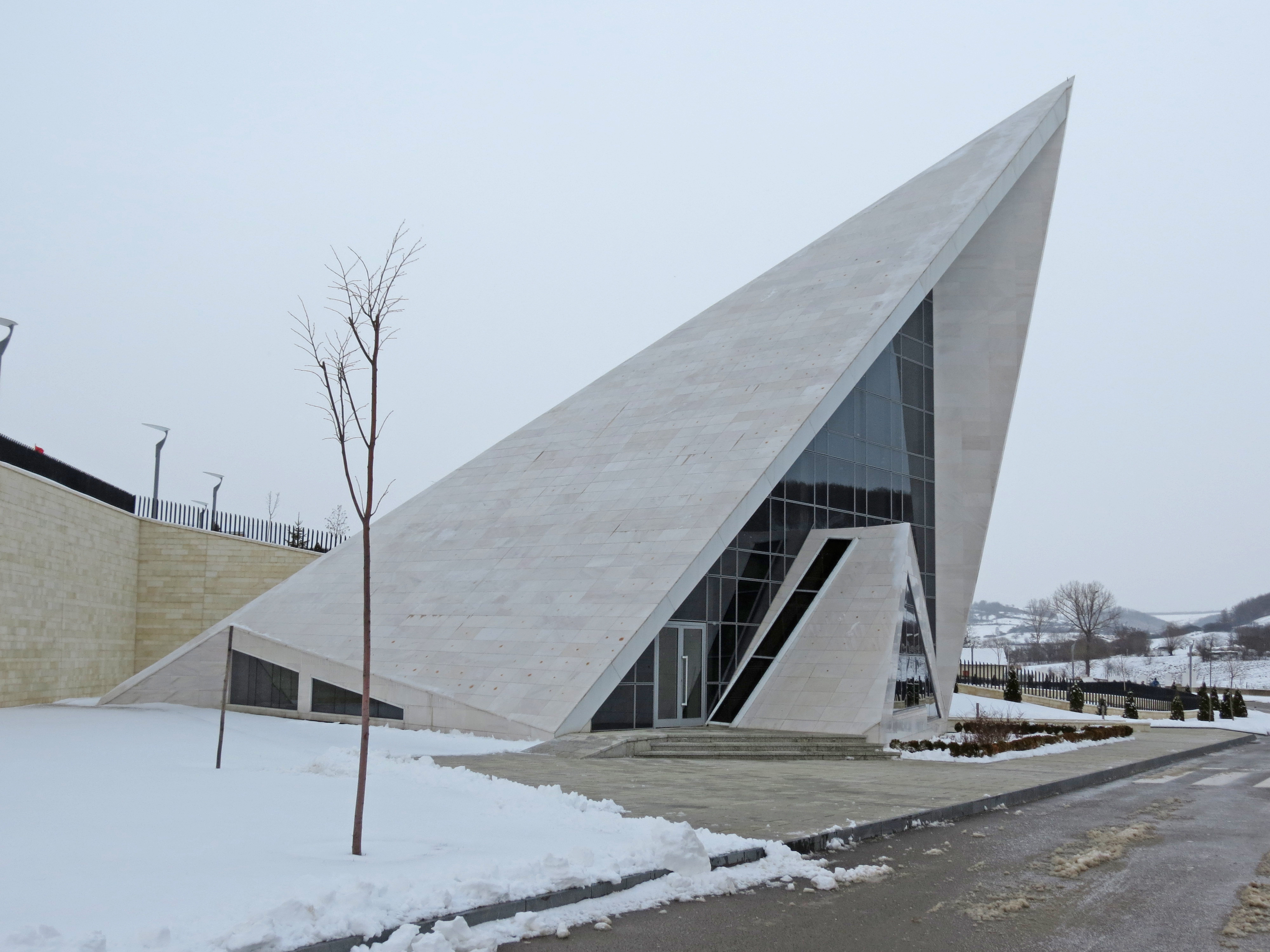
Adem Jashari Memorial Museum

The shootout at the Jashari family compound involving Adem Jashari, a KLA commander and surrounding Yugoslav troops in 1998 resulted in the massacre of most Jashari family members. The deaths of Jashari and his family generated an international backlash against the Federal Republic of Yugoslavia. The Prekaz attack led to a rapid increase of the KLA's popularity among ethnic-Albanians and village militias were formed in many parts of Kosovo. As news of the killings spread, armed Kosovo Albanian militias emerged throughout Kosovo, seeking to avenge Jashari's death as Albanians flocked to join the KLA. The event became a rallying call for KLA recruitment regarding armed resistance to Yugoslav forces.

After the event, Adem Jashari himself was portrayed as a "terrorist" in the Yugoslav media, while the Albanian media depicted him as a "freedom fighter". The casualties of the attack would be described as the fall of "martyrs" in the Albanian media, while in the Serbian media they were reported to be "collateral effects of the fight against terrorism". On 13 March, about 50,000 people demonstrated against the attacks, while on 15 March, the Catholic Church called for masses to be held throughout the region, after which about 15,000 people demonstrated in Pristina.

In late March 1998, more than 100,000 people marched in eight American cities and European capitals to protest the attack. Eventually, events spiralled out of control and the Kosovo War ensued.

== See also ==
- Drenica massacres

== Sources ==
- Abrahams, Fred; Andersen, Elizabeth (1998). Humanitarian Law Violations in Kosovo. Human Rights Watch. pp. 30–32. ISBN 978-1-56432-194-7.
- Di Lellio, Anna; Schwanders-Sievers, Stephanie (2006a). "The Legendary Commander: The construction of an Albanian master-narrative in post-war Kosovo" (PDF). Nations and Nationalism. 12 (3): 513–529. doi:10.1111/j.1469-8129.2006.00252.x.
- Di Lellio, Anna; Schwanders-Sievers, Stephanie (2006b). "Sacred Journey to a Nation: The Construction of a Shrine in Postwar Kosovo" (PDF). Journeys. 7 (1): 27–49. doi:10.3167/146526006780457315.
- Elsie, Robert (2011). Historical Dictionary of Kosovo. Scarecrow Press. ISBN 978-0-8108-7483-1.
- Judah, Tim (2002). Kosovo: War and Revenge. Yale University Press. ISBN 0300097255.
- Koktsidis, Pavlos Ioannis; Dam, Caspar Ten (2008). "A success story? Analysing Albanian ethno-nationalist extremism in the Balkans" (PDF). East European Quarterly. 42 (2): 161–190.
- Henriksen, Dag (2007). Nato's Gamble: Combining Diplomacy and Airpower in the Kosovo Crisis, 1998–1999. Naval Institute Press. ISBN 9781591143581.
- David, Saul (2015) The Encyclopedia Of War - From Ancient Egypt to Iraq (DK) On page 496 it says that Yugoslav army have 100 forces
