= War crimes in the Kosovo War =

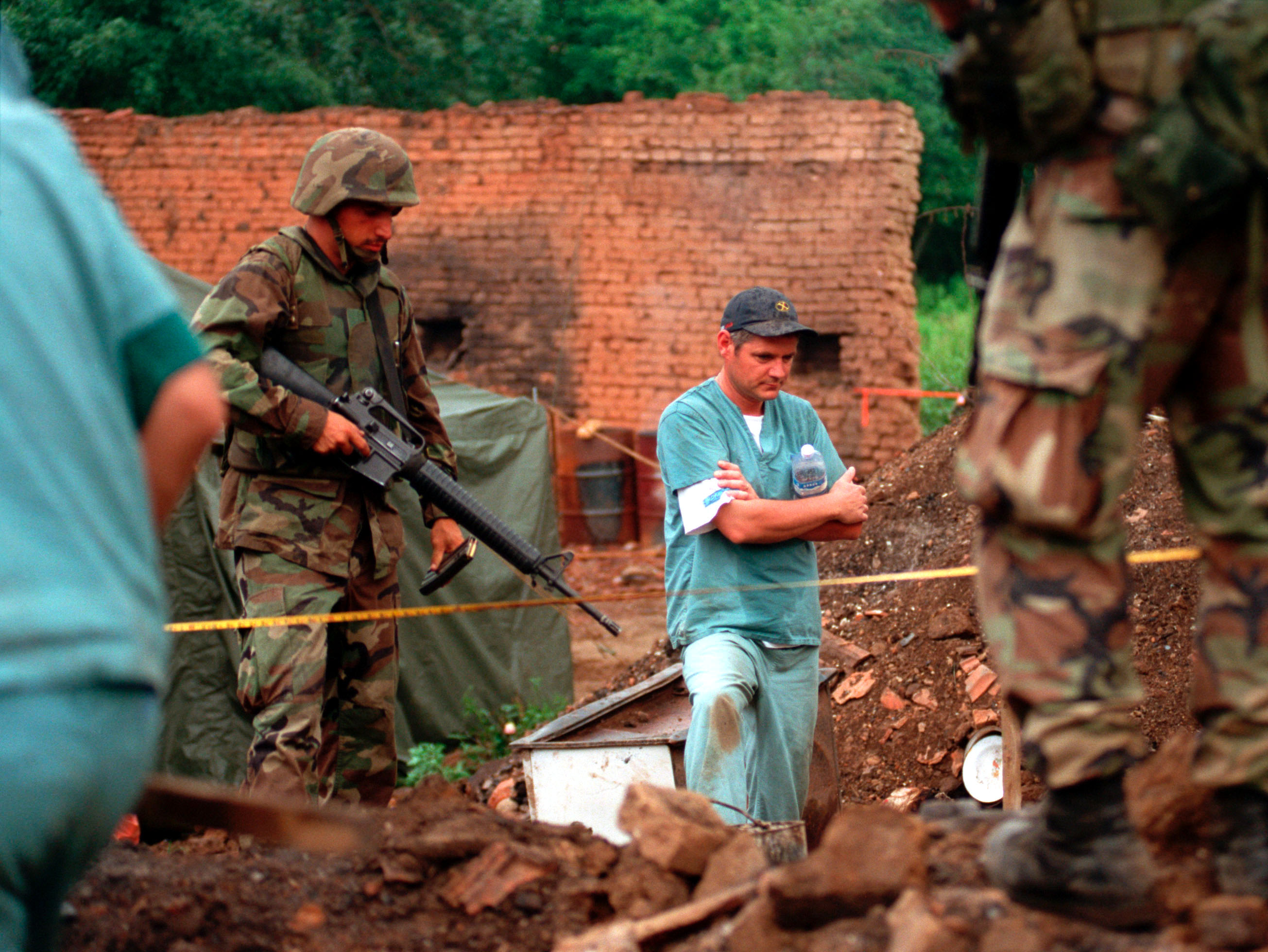
US Marines providing security as the Royal Canadian Mounted Police's forensic team investigate a grave site in a Kosovan village, 1 July 1999

War crimes were committed by all sides during the Kosovo War, which lasted from 28 February 1998 until 11 June 1999. According to Human Rights Watch (HRW), the vast majority of abuses were attributable to the government of Slobodan Milošević, mainly perpetrated by the Serbian police, the Yugoslav army, and Serb paramilitary units. During the war, Yugoslav forces killed between 7,000–9,000 Kosovo Albanians, engaged in numerous acts of rape, destroyed villages, and displaced nearly one million people. The Kosovo Liberation Army (KLA or the UÇK) has also been implicated in atrocities, such as kidnappings and summary executions of civilians. Moreover, the NATO bombing campaign has been harshly criticized by human rights organizations and the Serbian government for causing roughly 500 civilian casualties.

In 2015, the Humanitarian Law Center released a list of people who were killed or went missing from 1 January 1998 to 31 December 2000, including 8,676 Kosovo Albanian civilians, 1,196 ethnic Serbs and 445 civilians who were members of other ethnicities such as Romani people and Bosniaks.

== Background ==
By the 1980s, Kosovo Albanians constituted a majority in Kosovo. During the 1970s and 1980s, thousands of Serbs and Montenegrins left Kosovo, including some 57,000 during the 1970s alone. Socio-economic conditions, migration from underdeveloped areas, an increasingly adverse social-political climate and direct and indirect pressures were cited as the reasonings behind the departures. Slobodan Milošević gained political power by exploiting the grievances of Kosovo Serbs and pandering to the rising nationalist movement in Serbia.

Milošević abolished Kosovo's autonomy in 1989. With his rise to power, the Albanians started boycotting state institutions and ignoring the laws of the Republic of Serbia, culminating in the creation of the Republic of Kosova which received recognition from neighbouring Albania. Serbia (now in union with Montenegro as FR Yugoslavia) tried to maintain its political control over the province. With the formation of the Kosovo Liberation Army, a large number of Kosovo Albanians joined or supported the movement. The Serbian police and Yugoslav army response was brutal. In 1998, international sanctions were applied to the Federal Republic of Yugoslavia because of persecution of Kosovo's Albanians by Yugoslav security forces.

== Yugoslav war crimes ==
Serbian military, paramilitary and police forces in Kosovo have committed a wide range of war crimes, crimes against humanity, and other violations of international humanitarian and human rights law: forced expulsion of Kosovars from their homes; burning and looting of homes, schools, religious sites and healthcare facilities; detention, particularly of military-age men; summary execution; rape; violations of medical neutrality; and identity cleansing.

— Report released by the U.S. Department of State, Washington, DC, May 1999

Ethnic cleansing of Kosovo Albanians
- Part of the Kosovo War and the Yugoslav colonization of Kosovo
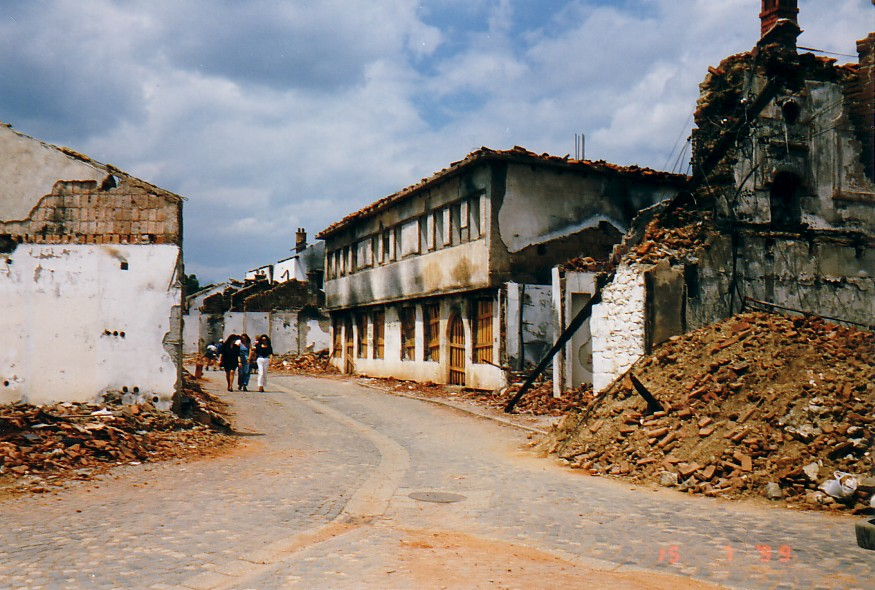
- Streetscape of destroyed village during Kosovo War, 1999
- Location: AP Kosovo and Metohija
- Date: 1998–1999
- Target: Kosovo Albanians
- Attack type: Ethnic cleansing, identity cleansing, genocidal massacres, gendercide, reprisals, genocidal rape
- Deaths: 7,000–9,000
- Victims: Human rights violations: • c. 850,000 expelled • up to 590,000 internally displaced • c. 10,000–45,600 most estimates say c. 20,000 women and girls raped
- Perpetrators: FR Yugoslavia • Yugoslav army • Serbian police Serbian paramilitaries
- Defenders: Kosovo Liberation Army, NATO
- Motive: Albanophobia

=== Persecution and ethnic cleansing ===
During the armed conflict in 1998, the Yugoslav army and Serbian police used excessive and random force, which resulted in property damage, the displacement of the population and the death of civilians. In the summer of 1998, hundreds of thousands of Albanians were driven from their homes.

The withdrawal of the Organization for Security and Co-operation in Europe monitors on 20 March 1999, together with the start of NATO's bombing campaign, encouraged Milošević to implement a "campaign of expulsions". The Yugoslav government maintained that the refugee crisis was caused by the bombings. It was alleged that the expulsions were part of an operation codenamed Horseshoe. However, the existence and implementation of this specific plan has not been proven. Nevertheless, Yugoslav army, Serbian police and Serb paramilitary forces in the spring of 1999, in an organized manner, initiated a broad campaign of violence against Albanian civilians in order to expel them from Kosovo and thus maintain the political control of Belgrade over the province.

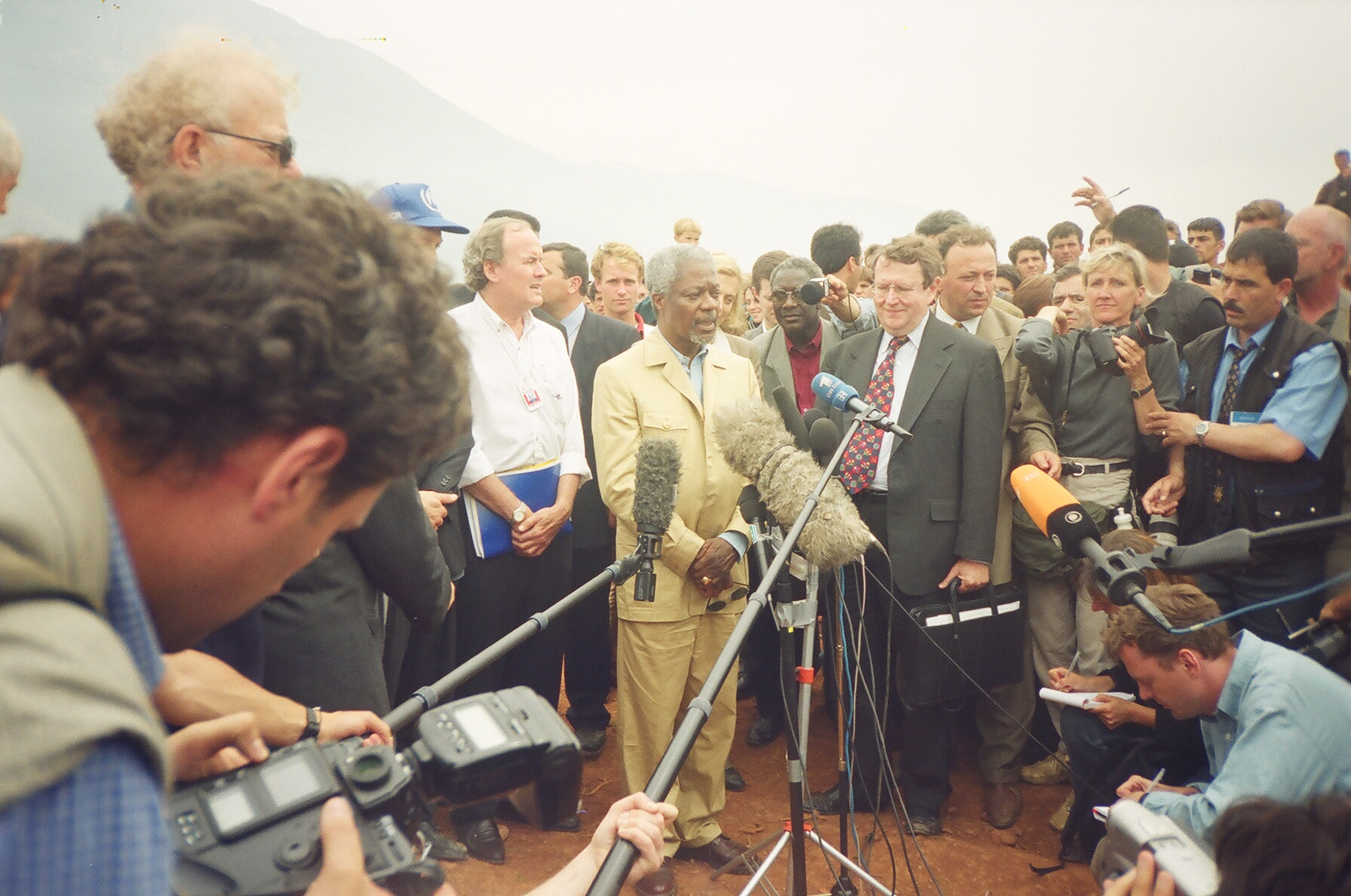
Kofi Annan, Secretary-General of the United Nations in a refugee camp in Kukës, Albania on May 20, 1999

According to the verdict of the International Criminal Tribunal for the former Yugoslavia, the Federal army and Serbian police systematically attacked Albanian-populated villages after the NATO bombing of Yugoslavia that began on 24 March 1999; abused, robbed and killed civilians, ordering them to go to Albania or Montenegro, burned their houses, and destroyed their property. Nemanja Stjepanović claimed that within the campaign of violence, Kosovo Albanians were expelled from their homes, murdered, sexually assaulted, and had their religious buildings destroyed. The Yugoslav forces committed numerous war crimes during the implementation of a "joint criminal enterprise" whose aim was to "through the use of violence and terror, force a significant number of Kosovo Albanians to leave their homes and cross the border in order for the state government to retain control over Kosovo." The ethnic cleansing of the Albanian population was performed in the following way: first the army surrounded a village, followed by shelling of the village, then the police entered it, often with the army, and then crimes occurred (murders, beatings, expulsions, sexual violence ...).

According to the United Nations High Commissioner for Refugees, by June 1999, the Yugoslav military, Serbian police and paramilitaries had expelled around 850,000 Albanians from Kosovo, and several hundred thousand more were internally displaced, in addition to those displaced prior to March. Approximately 440,000 refugees crossed the border into Albania and 320,000 fled to North Macedonia, while Bosnia and Herzegovina received more than 30,000.

Presiding Judge Iain Bonomy, who imposed the sentence, said that "deliberate actions of these forces during the campaign provoked the departure of at least 700,000 ethnic Albanians from Kosovo in the short period from late March to early June 1999."

=== Destruction of settlements ===
Human Rights Watch (HRW) wrote that the Yugoslav army indiscriminately attacked Kosovo Albanian villages. Police and military forces had partially or completely destroyed thousands of Albanian villages in Kosovo by burning or shelling them. According to a UNHCR survey, nearly 40% of all residential houses in Kosovo were heavily damaged or completely destroyed by the end of the war. Out of a total of 237,842 houses, 45,768 were heavily damaged and 46,414 were destroyed. In particular, homes in the city of Peja were heavily damaged. More than 80% of the 5,280 homes in the city were heavily damaged (1,590) or destroyed (2,774).

=== Rapes ===
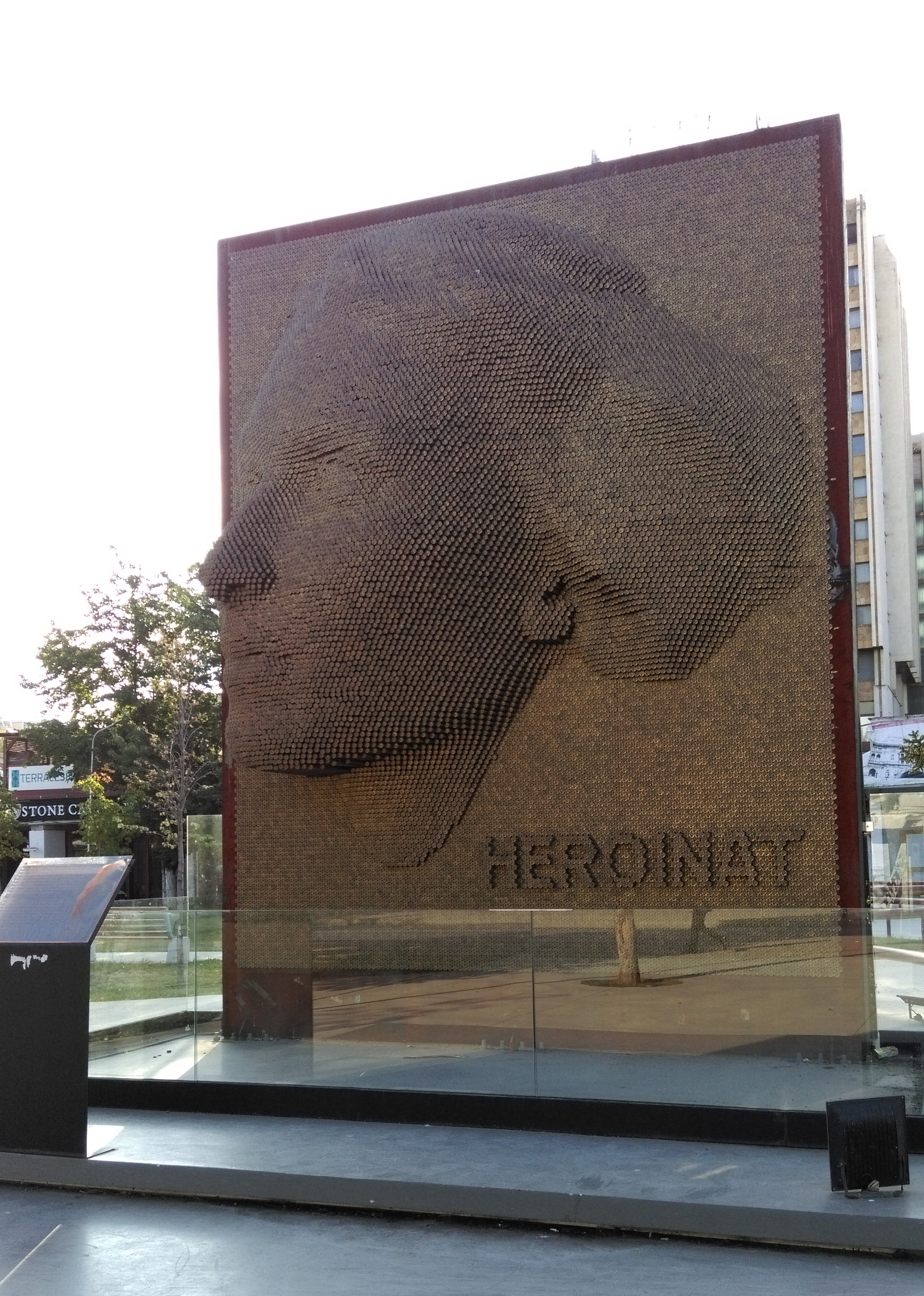
"Heroinat" (Heroines) monument in Pristina. It is dedicated to the female victims of sexual violence during the Kosovo War

Widespread rape and sexual violence occurred during the conflict and the majority of victims were Kosovo Albanian women. In 2000, Human Rights Watch documented 96 cases while adding that "it is likely that the number is much higher". The Centers for Disease Control and Prevention conducted a survey on displaced Albanians and found that approximately 4.3% of the population had been raped, and estimated that there had been between 23,000 and 45,600 female rape victims between August 1998 and August 1999. Other figures put forward for the number of rape victims were 10,000–20,000, the figures however have not been verified, given the lack of investigation into wartime rapes. The 20,000 estimate originated from a World Health Organization report and the US Centers for Disease Control from information gathered by local NGOs. The Kosovo Women's Network gave the figure of over 10,000 girls and women who experienced wartime rape. Due to a lack of prosecutions against perpetrators, there has been a reluctance for women to come forward or testify.

Throughout the duration of the war, members of the Yugoslav army, police and paramilitaries would remove girls and women fleeing for safety from refugee columns and rape them, at times more than once and later released them to continue their journey. Other women had been subjected to rape in their homes, at times in front of their family or in temporary refuges located by the women for their elderly parents or children as they attempted to flee the conflict. Other women stayed in Kosovo and were without protection. The crimes by the Yugoslav military, paramilitary and police amounted to crimes against humanity and a war crime of torture.

Although numbers are difficult to determine, following the conflict, there were cases of women committing suicide, aborting their pregnancies, giving birth to children and later raising them or placing them up for adoption with a few instances of attempted strangulation of their babies. Postwar, the issue of wartime rape did not receive enough attention in the media and in political discourse within Kosovo and victims were left to deal with their experiences in private.

The government has founded a programme to help those victims. As by October 2018, 250 women have signed up, despite pushing on behalf of the Kosovan government by giving free specialized healthcare and trauma counseling for wartime rape survivors. Many of the victims were young girls, from 13 to 19 years old. Many rapes were committed by paramilitaries associated with the Arkan group, where the majority of rapes were carried out in the presence of children and men who were later killed.

Vasfije Krasniqi-Goodman was the first woman to speak publicly about having suffered sexual violence during the Kosovo war. On April 14, 1999, when Krasniqi-Goodman was 16 years old, Serbian paramilitaries and police entered her village of Stanovc, Vushtrri. A Serbian policeman entered her house and later took her to the Church of Babimovc where she was raped by him and another man. Afterwards, she was threatened that her family would be killed if she revealed what had happened.

Victims from rural areas however face difficulties obtaining documents which prove they had medical treatment, gave birth or had abortions as a result of rape from medical centres that were set up for refugees in Albania, North Macedonia or Montenegro after they were expelled from their homes. Victims have also been asked to provide statements they gave to prosecutors in investigations which they were interviewed as victims of rape.

=== Destruction of mosques, churches, shrines, monuments and other traditional architecture ===
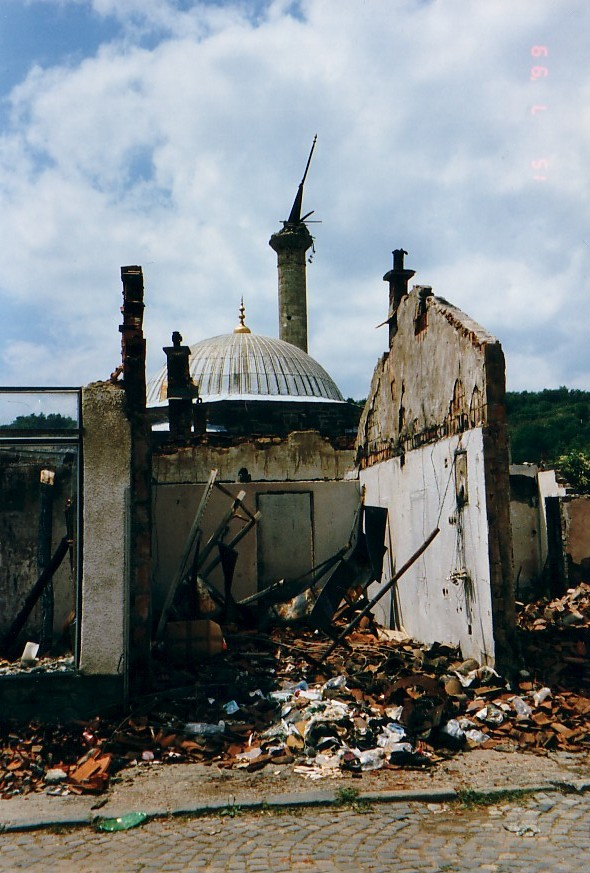
Destroyed mosque and houses

Numerous Albanian cultural sites in Kosovo were destroyed during the Kosovo conflict (1998–1999) which constituted a war crime violating the Hague and Geneva Conventions. Religious objects were also damaged or destroyed. Of the 498 mosques in Kosovo that were in active use, the International Criminal Tribunal for the former Yugoslavia (ICTY) documented that 225 mosques sustained damage or destruction by the Yugoslav Serb army. In all, eighteen months of the Yugoslav Serb counterinsurgency campaign between 1998 and 1999 within Kosovo resulted in 225 or a third out of a total of 600 mosques being damaged, vandalised, or destroyed alongside other Islamic architecture during the conflict. Other Islamic monuments were also targeted, two Sufi shrines/lodges dating from the 15-18th century were destroyed, A 15th century hamam and all nine quran reading schools were also destroyed. Additionally 500 Albanian owned kulla dwellings (traditional stone tower houses) and three out of four well preserved Ottoman period urban centres located in Kosovo cities were badly damaged resulting in great loss of traditional architecture. Kosovo's public libraries, in particular 65 out of 183 were completely destroyed with a loss of 900,588 volumes, while Islamic libraries sustained damage or destruction resulting in the loss of rare books, manuscripts and other collections of literature. Archives belonging to the Islamic Community of Kosovo with records spanning 500 years were also destroyed. During the war, Islamic architectural heritage posed for Yugoslav Serb paramilitary and military forces as Albanian patrimony with destruction of non-Serbian architectural heritage being a methodical and planned component of ethnic cleansing in Kosovo.

=== Identity cleansing ===
Identity cleansing was a strategy employed by the government of Yugoslavia during the Kosovo War. Identity cleansing is defined as "confiscation of personal identification, passports, and other such documents to make it difficult or impossible for those driven out to return".

Expelled Kosovo Albanians claimed that they were systematically stripped of identity and property documents including passports, land titles, automobile license plates, identity cards and other documents. In conjunction with the policy of expelling ethnic Albanians from the province, the Yugoslavs would confiscate all documents that indicated the identity of those being expelled. Physicians for Human Rights reports that nearly 60% of respondents to its survey observed Yugoslav forces removing or destroying personal identification documents. Human Rights Watch also documented the common practice of "identity cleansing": refugees expelled toward Albania were frequently stripped of their identity documents and forced to remove the license plates from their vehicles. The occurrence of these acts suggested that the government was trying to block their return.

In addition to confiscating the relevant documents from their holders, efforts were also made to destroy any actual birth records (and other archives) which were maintained by governmental agencies, so as to make the "cleansing" complete (this latter tactic sometimes being referred to as archival cleansing).

=== Massacres of civilians ===
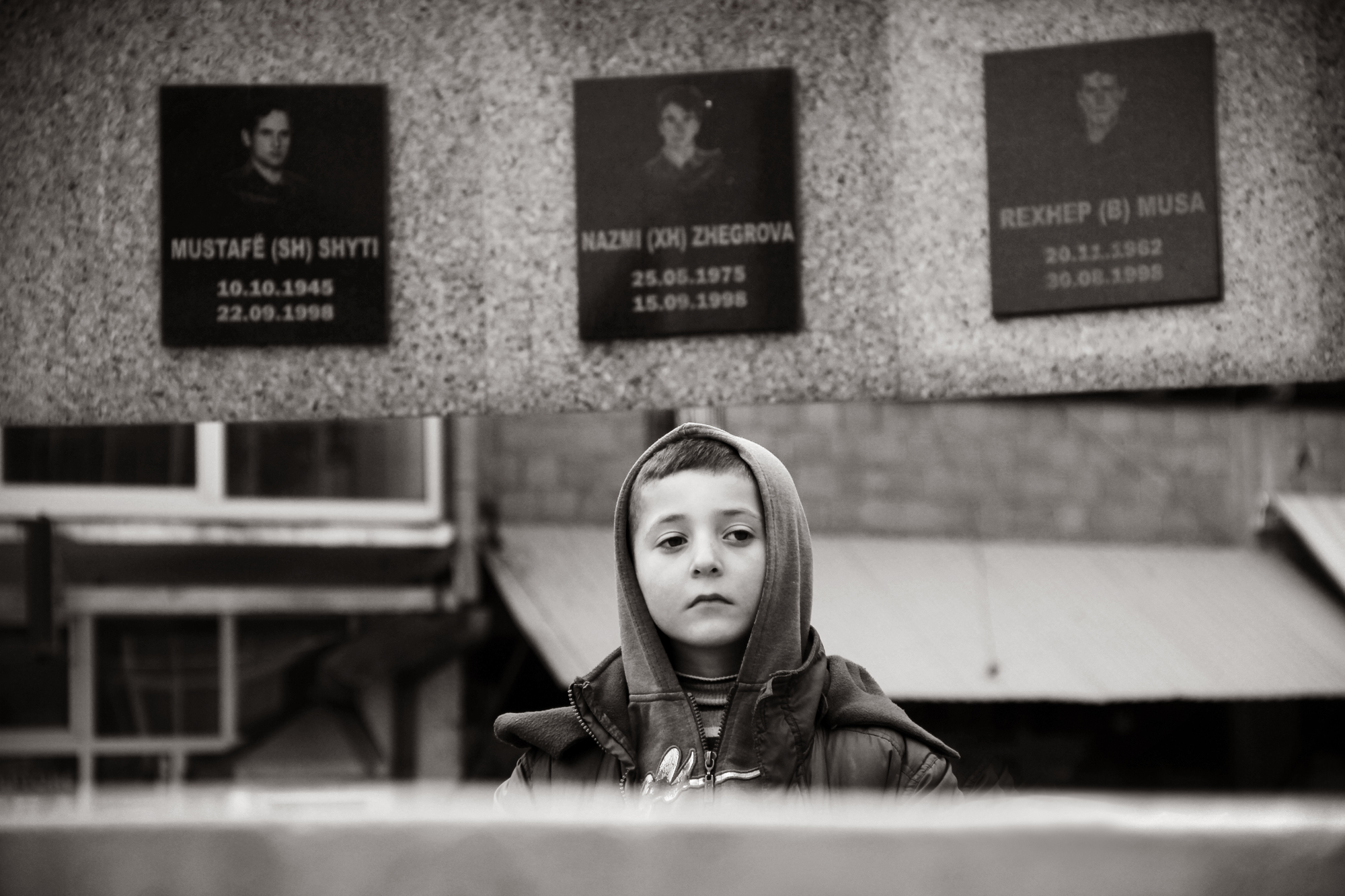
Memorial to Albanian victims in Vushtrri

Incomplete list of massacres:

- Meja massacre – at least 377 persons were killed by Serbian police and paramilitary forces in May 1999.
- Pastasel massacre – Serbian forces entered the village of Pastasel and expelled the women. Men from the village were gathered together and 106 were executed.
- Vushtrri massacre – More than 100 Kosovo refugees were killed by Serbian police.
- Krusha massacres – The ICTY discovered 98 bodies at Velika Kruša and, according to Human Rights Watch, the number of people killed could exceed this number. According to the ICTY, Sava Matić participated in the murder of 42 persons on March 26, 1999. There were also allegations of mass rape.
- Izbica massacre – Serbian forces killed at least 93 Albanian civilians.
- Rezalla massacre – About 83 Albanian civilians were captured and most of them were executed, leaving only two survivors.
- Orahovac massacre – Serbian forces executed 79 ethnic Albanians.
- Dubrava Prison massacre – Prison guards killed more than 70 Albanian prisoners in Dubrava Prison.
- Bela Crkva massacre – 62 known fatalities
- Suva Reka massacre on 26 March 1999 – 48 Albanian civilians killed, among them many children.
- Poklek massacre – 17 April 1999 – at least 47 people were forced into one room and systematically gunned down. The precise number of dead is unknown, although it is certain that 23 children under the age of fifteen were killed in the massacre.
- Račak massacre (or "Operation Račak") on 15 January 1999 – 45 Albanians were rounded up and killed by Serbian special forces. The first forensic report, by a joint Yugoslavian and Belarusian team, claimed that those killed were not civilians. This, however, was untrue as all 45 victims were civilians, though nine KLA members were also killed in the village. The massacre provoked a shift in Western policy towards the war.
- Ćuška massacre – 41 known victims.
- Attack on Prekaz – Serbian forces launched an operation aimed at killing Adem Jashari and his family. Approximately 58 members of the Jashari family were killed, including at least three non-combatants by summary execution and 28 women and young children.
- Drenica massacre – there were 29 identified corpses discovered in a mass-grave, committed by Serbian law enforcement.
- Likoshan and Çirez massacres – 26 Albanian civilians were killed.
- Mala Kaludra massacre on 19 April 1999 – 23 Albanian refugees were killed by Serbian paramilitaries as they fled towards Montenegro.
- Imeraj massacre on 26 March 1999 – Serbian forces entered the village of Pemishtë/Cërkolez and killed 19 Albanian civilians including 13 women and children.
- Gornje Obrinje massacre – 18 corpses were found, but more people were killed.
- Podujevo massacre – 14 Albanian civilians were killed and 5 wounded, including women, children and the elderly.
- Albanian leaders massacre – 5 Albanian leaders were killed after they had attended the funeral of Albanian lawyer Bajram Kelmendi.

=== Cover-up ===
Soon after NATO started bombing Yugoslavia, Slobodan Milošević ordered that all bodies in Kosovo that could be of interest to The Hague Tribunal should be removed. The Yugoslav army systematically transported the corpses of Albanians to places like the Trepça Mines near Mitrovica, where their remains were allegedly cremated. Thus, according to one source, it was estimated that between 1,200 and 1,500 bodies were burned in the Trepça Mines. However, these allegations surrounding the Trepça mines turned out to be false. More corpses of Kosovo Albanians were transported into Serbia, where the bodies were buried in mass-graves such as those at Batajnica.

In May 2001, the Serbian government announced that 86 bodies of Kosovo Albanians were thrown into the river Danube during the Kosovo War. After four months of excavations, Serbian forensic-experts located at least seven mass graves and some 430 bodies (including the corpses of women and children) in Central Serbia. Those sites included the graves at Batajnica near Belgrade, at Petrovo Selo in eastern Serbia and near Perućac Dam in western Serbia. So far, about 800 remains of Albanians killed and buried in mass graves in Serbia have been exhumed and returned to their families in Kosovo. Most of the bodies were discovered near Special Anti-Terrorist police bases where Serbian Anti-Terrorism units were stationed and trained in clandestine operations.

As a witness in the trial of eight police officers for war crimes against Albanian civilians during the Suva Reka massacre, Dragan Karleuša, the investigator of the Ministry of Interior of Serbia, testified that there are more graves in Serbia.

He commented, "why would they remove bodies in this way if the people had died normally," and concluded that they did not die normally and that the campaign to remove the bodies was, in fact, a cover-up for a "terrible crime".

According to the Humanitarian Law Center in Belgrade and Kosovo, in the period largely covering NATO's bombing of Yugoslavia (20 March-14 June 1999), Yugoslav forces killed 6,901 Albanian non-combatants.

== KLA war crimes ==
Albanian war crimes
- Part of the Kosovo War
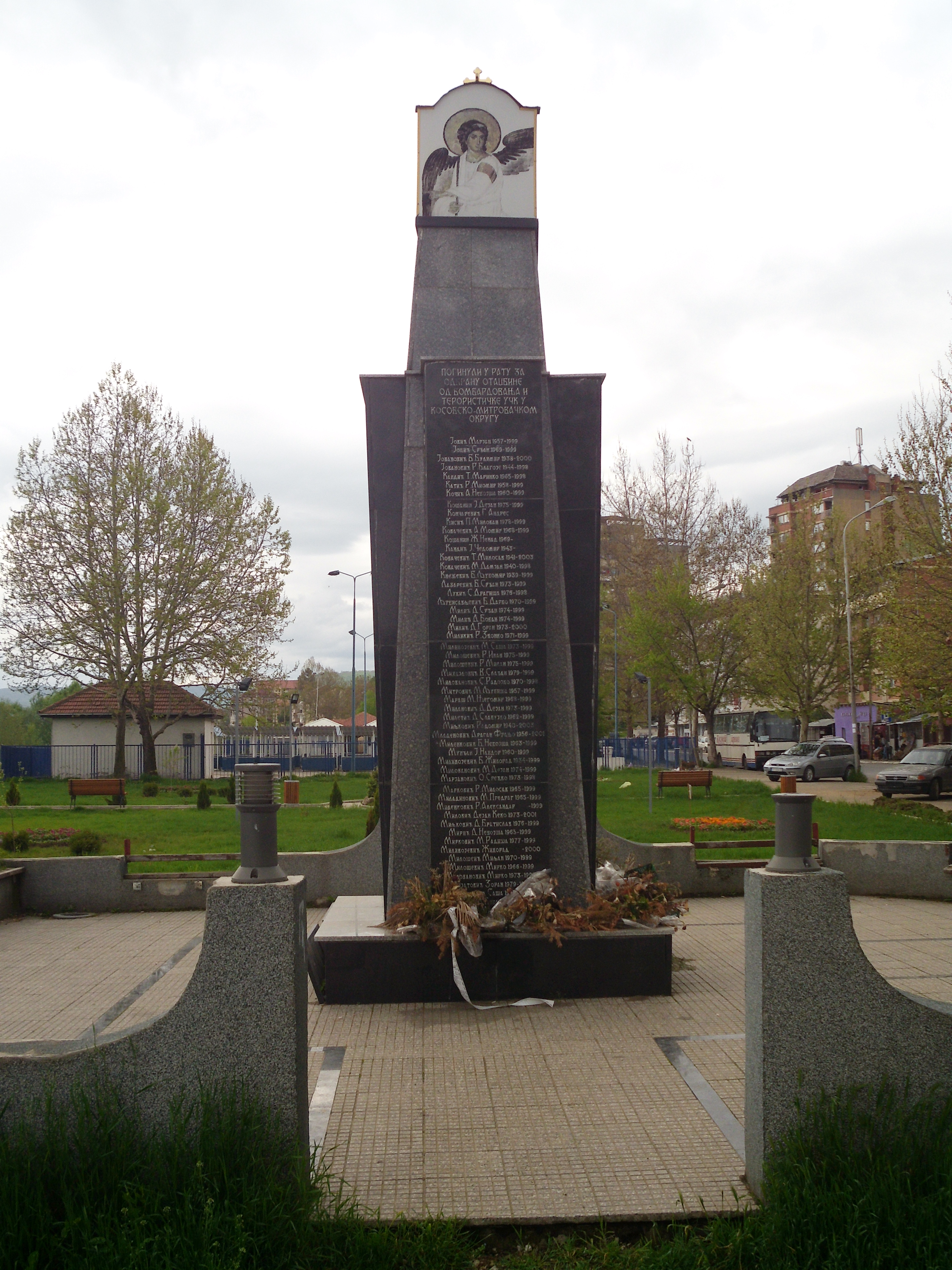
- Monument to Serb victims in Mitrovica
- Location: Kosovo
- Date: 1998–2001
- Target: Serbs and other non-Albanians (mainly Roma and some Croats), Albanians accused of collaborating with the FR Yugoslavia
- Attack type: Ethnic cleansing, summary executions, massacres, kidnappings, torture, rape
- Deaths: Until June 1999: Serbian estimate: 335 by the KLA; HLC estimate: 464 by the KLA (since 20 March 1999); After June 1999: Serbian claim: 847 (both security forces and civilians)
- Victims: Until June 1999: 560 non-Albanians presumably kidnapped by the KLA; After June 1999: Serbian claim: 1,154 kidnapped (both security forces and civilians); Expulsions: Tens of thousands expelled; Around 350 Croats
- Perpetrators: Elements of the Kosovo Liberation Army, Albanian gangs and extremists
- Defenders: Serbian police, Yugoslav army
- Motive: Serbophobia

=== Kidnappings and summary executions ===
In some villages under Albanian control in 1998, militants drove ethnic Serbs from their homes. Some of those who remained are unaccounted for and are presumed to have been abducted by the KLA and killed. The KLA detained an estimated 85 Serbs during its 19 July 1998 attack on Rahovec; only 35 of these were subsequently released. On 22 July 1998, the KLA briefly took control of the Belaćevac mine near the town of Obiliq. Nine Serb mineworkers were captured that day and they remain on the International Committee of the Red Cross's list of the missing and are presumed to have been killed. In August 1998, 22 Serbian civilians were alleged to have been killed in the village of Klecka, where the police claimed to have discovered human remains and a kiln used to cremate bodies; Human Rights Watch has not been able to substantiate this claim. In September 1998, Serbian police collected 34 bodies of people believed to have been seized and murdered by the KLA, among them some ethnic Albanians, at Lake Radonjić near Gllogjan in what became known as the Lake Radonjić massacre.

According to the International Committee of the Red Cross and the ICTY, 97 Kosovo Serbs were kidnapped in 1998. According to a Serbian government report, from 1 January 1998 to 10 June 1999 the UÇK killed 988 people and kidnapped 287; of those killed, 335 were civilians, 351 were Yugoslav soldiers, 230 were Serb police and 72 were unidentified; by nationality, 87 of the civilians killed were Serbs, 230 were Albanians, and 18 were of other nationalities. The Serbian government report estimated that after the war ended, 709 Serb civilians were killed and 1002 were kidnapped during the period 10 June 1999 to 11 November 2001. According to the Humanitarian Law Center in Belgrade and Kosovo, in the period largely covering NATO's bombing of Yugoslavia (20 March-14 June 1999), the KLA killed 328 Serb civilians and 136 Roma and other non-Albanian civilians.

According to the Kosovo government's Commission on Missing Persons, in 2019 560 non-Albanians were still missing from the war, including 360 Serbs. The majority disappeared between June 1999 and December 2000 following the withdrawal of Yugoslav troops from the region.

=== Massacres of civilians ===
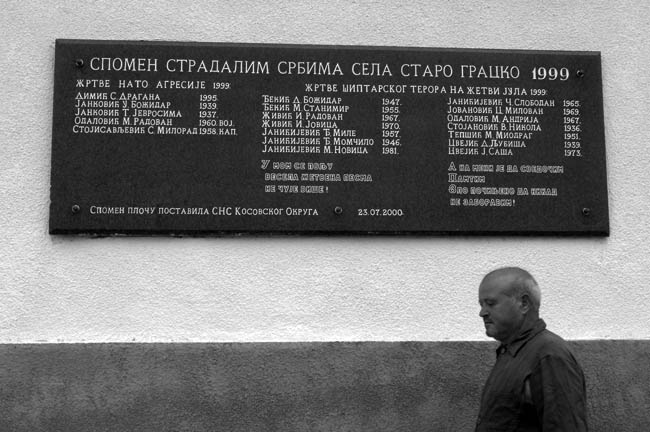
Staro Gracko massacre memorial

Incomplete list of massacres:

- Gnjilane killings in 1999 – After the end of the war, around 51 Serbs and other non-Albanians reportedly killed.
- Orahovac massacre – More than 100 Serbian and Roma civilians were imprisoned and 47 were killed.
- Lake Radonjić massacre – 34 individuals of Serb, Roma and Albanian ethnicity were discovered by a Serbian forensic team near the lake.
- Volujak massacre – 25 male Kosovo Serb civilians were murdered by members of the KLA in July 1998.
- Klečka killings – 8-10 Serbs and Albanians were killed whom the KLA considered "collaborators".
- Peć massacre – 20 Serbs were murdered and their corpses were thrown down wells.
- Ugljare massacre – 15 Serbs were murdered by Albanian separatists.
- Staro Gračko massacre – 14 Serbian farmers were murdered by suspected Albanian militants.
- Malisevo massacre – 12 Kosovo Serbs and a Bulgarian were executed after being taken prisoner.

=== Ethnic cleansing ===
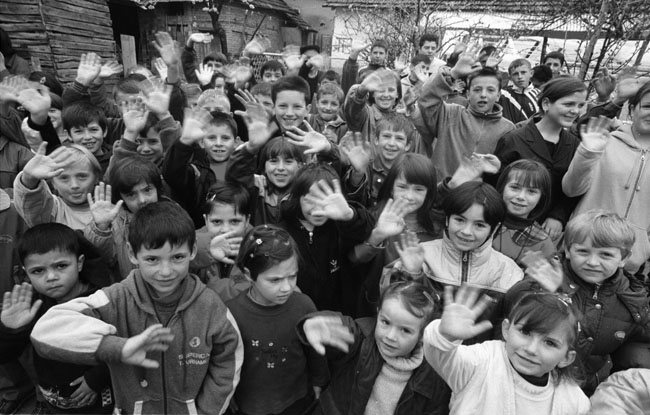
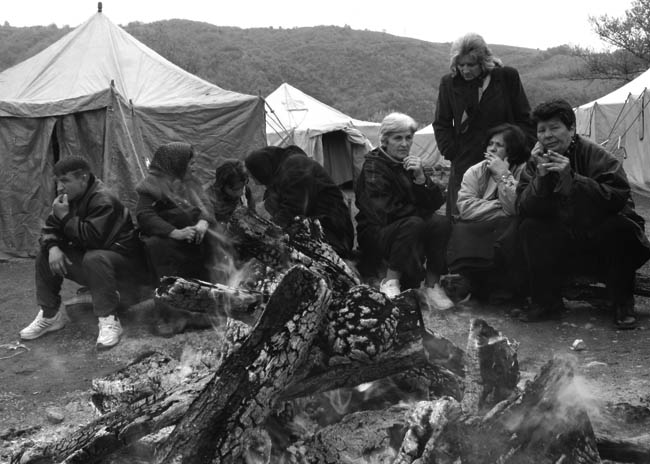
Serbian and other non-Albanian refugees

According to a 2001 report by Human Rights Watch:

The KLA was responsible for serious abuses... including abductions and murders of Serbs and ethnic Albanians considered collaborators with the state. Elements of the KLA are also responsible for post-conflict attacks on Serbs, Roma, and other non-Albanians, as well as ethnic Albanian political rivals... widespread and systematic burning and looting of homes belonging to Serbs, Roma, and other minorities and the destruction of Orthodox churches and monasteries... combined with harassment and intimidation designed to force people from their homes and communities... elements of the KLA are clearly responsible for many of these crimes.

=== Use of child soldiers ===
According to the 2001 UNHCR Global report: "there was considerable evidence of the use of child soldiers by armed opposition groups, especially the KLA, UCPMB and Free Montenegro group" during the Kosovo war.

When KLA members were registered by the International Organisation for Migration in Kosovo in 2000, around 10% were under the age of 18, while roughly 2% were below the age of 16, with some as young as 13. Under-18 recruits were mainly girls recruited to cook, and were not combatants.

=== Prison camps ===
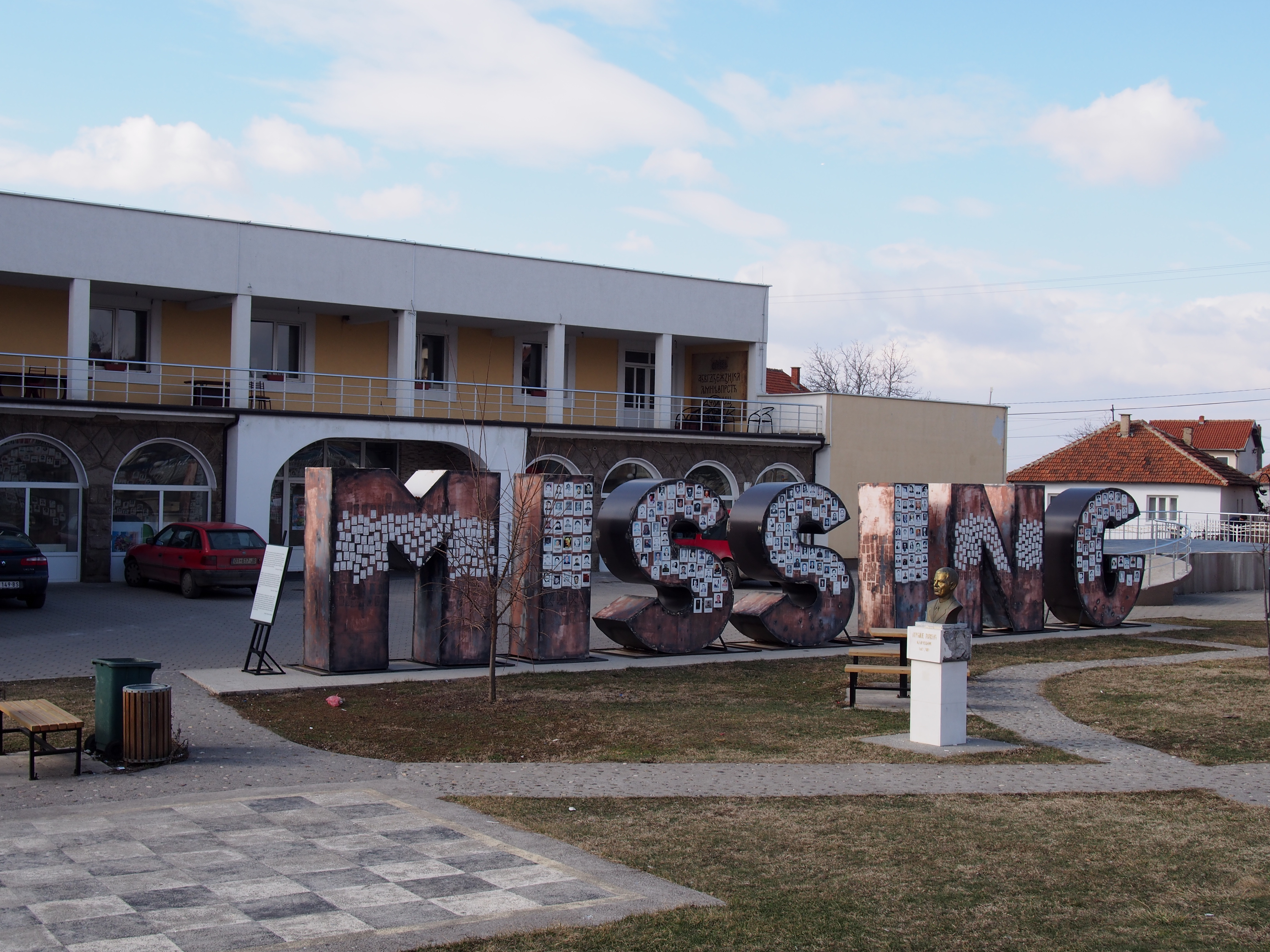
The "Missing" monument in Gračanica dedicated for the Serb victims missing from the Kosovo War

Some of the prison camps in Kosovo were:

- Lapušnik – A KLA prison camp in Drenas where 23 Serbs and Albanians were killed. Haradin Bala, a KLA prison guard, was found guilty of torture, mistreatment of prisoners and murder for crimes committed at the camp.
- Jablanica – 10 individuals were detained and tortured by KLA forces including: one Serb, three Montenegrins, one Bosnian, three Albanians, and two victims of unknown ethnicity.
- According to sources who spoke to the BBC, there were detention camps in Albania where Serbs and Roma civilians kidnapped by Albanian militants were taken, held, interrogated, tortured and in most cases killed.

=== Organ theft allegations ===
During and after the 1999 war, accusations were made of people being killed in order to remove their organs to sell them on the black market. Various sources estimated that the number of victims ranged from a "handful", up to 50, between 24 and 100 to over 300. The allegations were first publicized by then Chief Prosecutor for the ICTY Carla Del Ponte in her book The Hunt: Me and the War Criminals in 2008, causing a large response. According to the book after the end of the war in 1999, Kosovo Albanians were smuggling organs of between 100 and 300 Serbs and other minorities from the province to Albania. The perpetrators are said to have strong links to the Kosovo Liberation Army (UÇK). Claims were investigated first by the ICTY who found medical equipment and traces of blood in and around the house in Albania that had allegedly been used as an operating theater to remove the organs. They were then investigated by the UN, who received witness reports from many ex-UÇK fighters who stated that several of the prisoners had their organs removed.

In 2011, the French media outlet France 24 released a 2003 classified UN document which indicated that the UN had known about the allegations at that time. In 2010, a report by Swiss prosecutor Dick Marty to the Council of Europe (CoE) uncovered "credible, convergent indications" of an illegal trade in human organs going back over a decade, including the deaths of a "handful" of Serb captives killed for this purpose.

On 25 January 2011, the report was endorsed by the CoE. However, senior sources in the European Union Rule of Law Mission in Kosovo (EULEX) and many members of the European Parliament have expressed serious doubts regarding the report and its foundations, believing Marty failed to provide "any evidence" concerning the allegations. A EULEX special investigation was launched in August 2011. Responding to this allegation, the head of the war crimes unit of Eulex (the European Law and Justice Mission in Kosovo), Matti Raatikainen, claimed "The fact is that there is no evidence whatsoever in this case, no bodies. No witnesses. All the reports and media attention to this issue have not been helpful to us. In fact they have not been helpful to anyone." He described these allegations as a "distraction" that prevented the war crimes unit from finding the remains of close to 2,000 individuals of Serb, Albanian, and Roma ethnicity still missing in the conflict. The EU Report which was released in 2014 concluded that organ theft and trafficking took place but "on a very limited scale with a few individuals involved".

== NATO ==
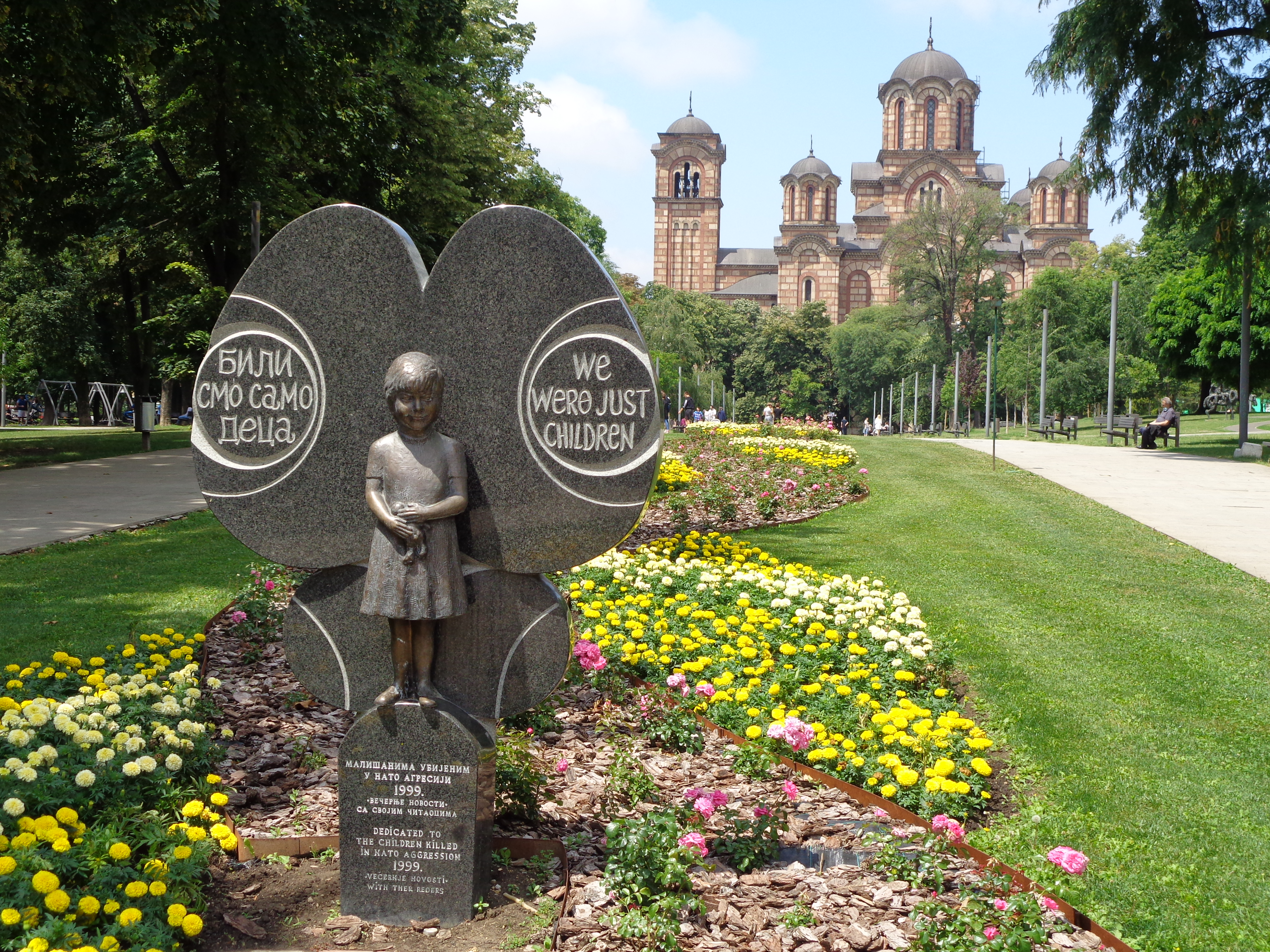
A monument to the children killed in the NATO bombing located in Tašmajdan Park, Belgrade, featuring a bronze sculpture of Milica Rakić

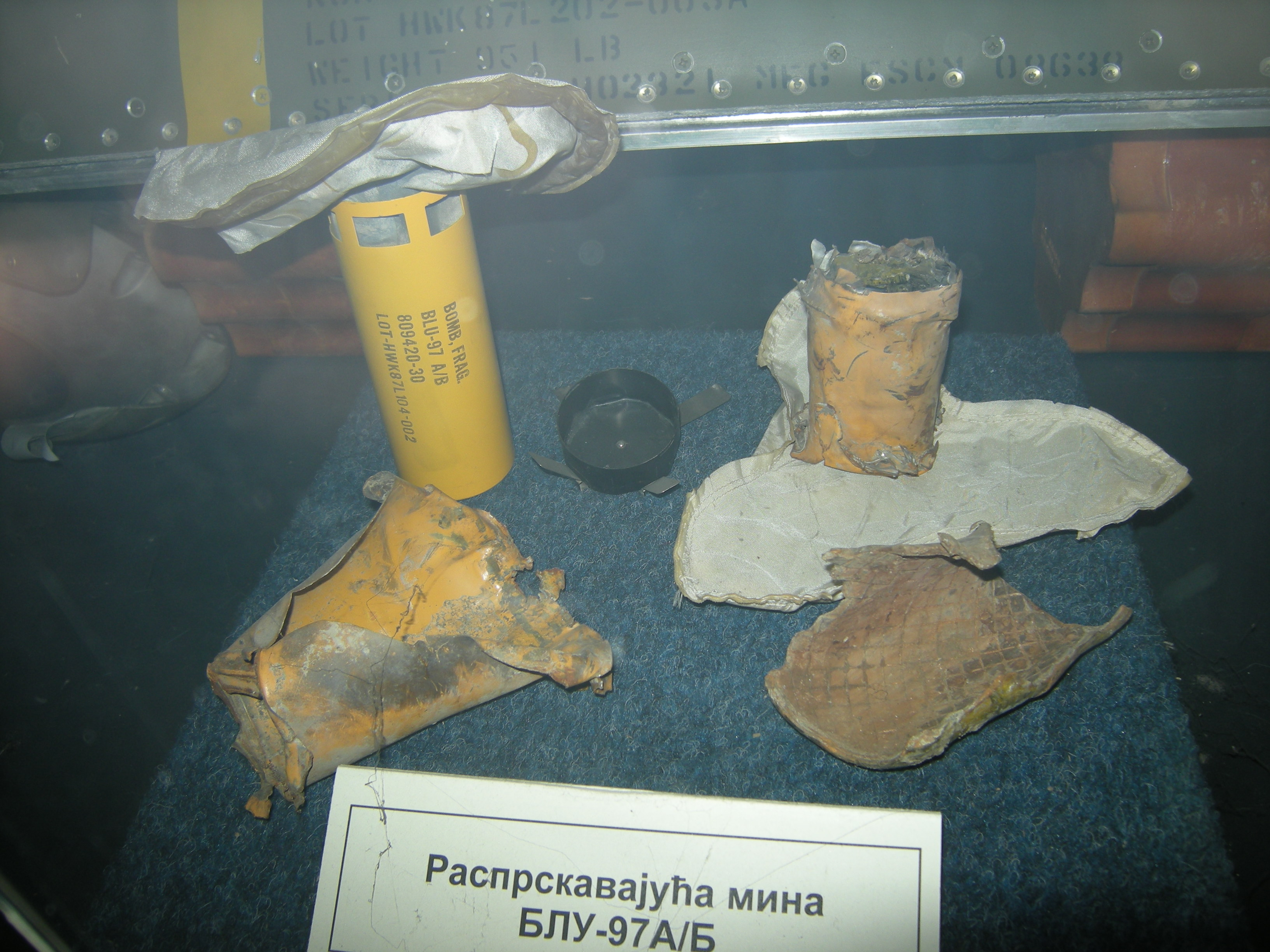
The NATO cluster munition in the Aeronautical Museum Belgrade

=== Civilian casualties ===
The Serbian government and a number of international human rights groups (e.g., Amnesty International) claimed that NATO had carried out war crimes by bombing civilians. The chief prosecutor for the war crimes tribunal for the former Yugoslavia in The Hague, Carla del Ponte, concluded that its investigation found no basis for charging NATO or its leaders with war crimes. According to Human Rights Watch, between 489 and 528 civilians were killed by NATO airstrikes of which 207 civilians were of Serbian and Montenegrin ethnicity, 219 were Albanian, 14 civilians were Roma, and 14 were of other nationalities. According to Serbian sources, the number of civilian casualties caused by the NATO bombing stood at 2,500.

Incomplete list of civilian casualties caused by NATO:

- Grdelica train bombing
- NATO bombing of Albanian refugees near Gjakova
- Koriša bombing
- NATO bombing of the Radio Television of Serbia headquarters
- Lužane bus bombing
- Cluster bombing of Niš (Cluster bombs were illegal by 2008, but were legal in 1999)
- US bombing of the People's Republic of China embassy in Belgrade
- Varvarin bridge bombing
- Dragiša Mišović hospital bombing

== Aftermath ==
=== Refugees ===
An estimated 200,000 Serbs and Roma fled Kosovo after the war. Romani people were also driven out after being harassed by Albanian gangs and vengeful individuals. The Yugoslav Red Cross registered 247,391 mostly Serb refugees by November 1999. During the Kosovo War, over 90,000 Serbian and other non-Albanian refugees fled the war-torn province. In the days after the Yugoslav Army withdrew, over 164,000 Serbs (around 75%) and 24,000 Roma (around 85%) left Kosovo and many of the remaining civilians were victims of abuse. After Kosovo and other Yugoslav Wars, Serbia became home to the highest number of refugees and IDPs (including Kosovo Serbs) in Europe.

In 2007, tens of thousands of Serbs were preparing to flee the province of Kosovo, packing their bags, fearing a new wave of ethnic cleansing at the hands of the Kosovo's new Albanian-led administration.

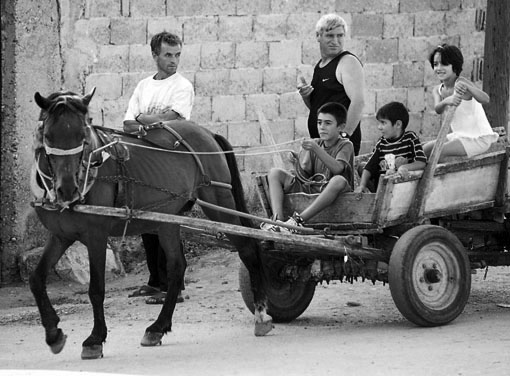
Serbian refugees

=== Killings ===
According to a 2001 Human Rights Watch report, as "many as one thousand Serbs and Roma have been murdered or have gone missing since 12 June 1999."

According to a Serbian government report, in the period from 10 June 1999 – 11 November 2001, when NATO had been in control in Kosovo, 847 people were reported to have been killed and 1,154 kidnapped. This comprised both civilians and security forces personnel.

==== Number of victims in the war in Kosovo ====
Estimates for the number of people killed during the Kosovo War vary but is estimated to be nearly 10,000. Between 7,000 and 9,000 Kosovar Albanians were killed by Yugoslav forces according to the International Criminal Tribunal for the former Yugoslavia. In 2014, the Humanitarian Law Centre in Serbia and Kosovo compiled a list of people who were killed or went missing during the war and in its aftermath, from January 1998 to December 31, 2000. The list totaled 13,517 people and included 8,661 Albanian civilians, 1,196 Serbs, and 447 Roma, Bosniaks and other non-Albanians; the rest were combatants.

=== Destruction of Serbian heritage ===
In total, 155 Serbian Orthodox churches and monasteries were destroyed between 11 June 1999 and 19 March 2004, after the end of the Kosovo War and including the 2004 unrest in Kosovo. KLA fighters are accused of vandalizing Devič monastery and terrorizing the staff. The KFOR troops said KLA rebels vandalized centuries-old murals and paintings in the chapel and stole two cars and all the monastery's food. Many other churches were the target of attacks by Albanian militants.

== War crimes trials ==
=== Criminal prosecutions of Serbian leaders before the ICTY ===
Slobodan Milošević, along with Milan Milutinović, Nikola Šainović, Dragoljub Ojdanić and Vlajko Stojiljković were charged by the International Criminal Tribunal for the Former Yugoslavia (ICTY) with crimes against humanity including murder, forcible population transfer, deportation and "persecution on political, racial or religious grounds". Further indictments were leveled in October 2003 against former armed forces chief of staff Nebojša Pavković, former army corps commander Vladimir Lazarević, former police official Vlastimir Đorđević and the current head of Serbia's public security, Sreten Lukić. All were indicted for crimes against humanity and violations of the laws or customs of war. Milosevic died in ICTY custody before sentencing.

The Court has pronounced the following verdicts:

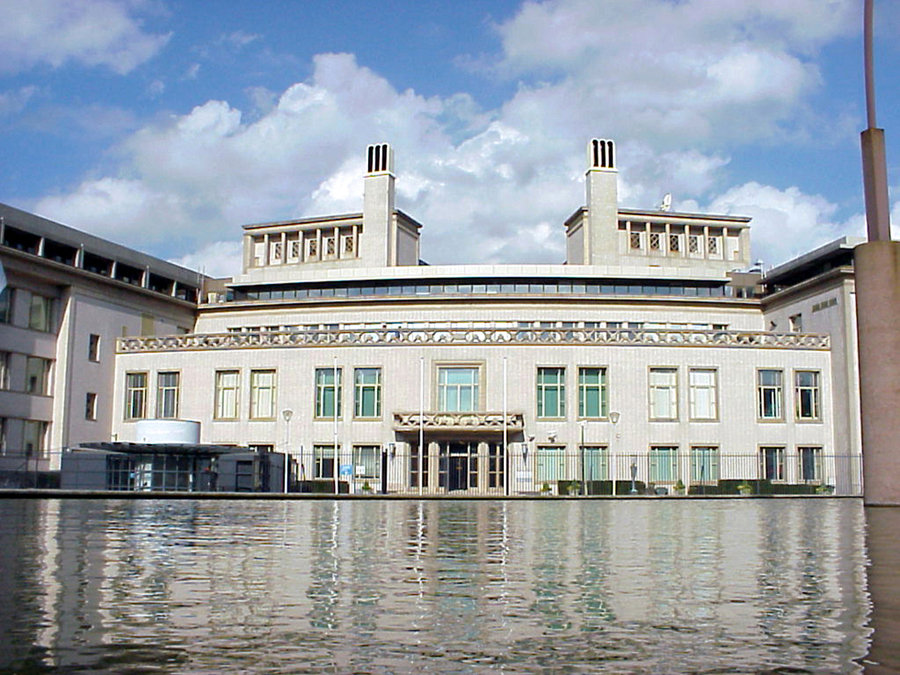
International Criminal Tribunal for the former Yugoslavia

- Milan Milutinović, former president of the Republic of Serbia and Yugoslav Foreign Minister, acquitted.
- Nikola Šainović, Yugoslav deputy prime minister, guilty on all counts, sentenced to 22 years in prison.
- Dragoljub Ojdanić, Chief of General Staff of the VJ, guilty to two counts, sentenced to 15 years in prison.
- Nebojša Pavković, commander of Third Army, guilty on all counts, sentenced to 22 years in prison.
- Vladimir Lazarević, commander of the Pristina Corps VJ, guilty of two counts, sentenced to 15 years in prison.
- Sreten Lukić, Chief of Staff of the Serbian police, guilty on all counts, sentenced to 22 years in prison.
- Vlastimir Đorđević, Chief of the Public Security Department of Serbia's Ministry of Internal Affairs, guilty of five counts, including crimes against humanity and war crimes, and sentenced to 27 years in prison.

Šainović, Pavković and Lukić were convicted as members of a joint criminal enterprise, while the others were convicted of aiding and abetting crimes.

=== Domestic trials in Serbia ===
==== Petrović case ====
The first trials in Serbia & FRY regarding the atrocities against Kosovar Albanians occurred in 2000 in front of martial courts, as charges of murder. The Niš Military Court in late 2000 found Captain Dragiša Petrović and army reservists sergeant Nenad Stamenković and Tomica Jović guilty of the murder of two Albanian civilians on 28 March 1999 in the village of Gornja Sušica near Pristina. Petrović got four years and ten months, while Stamenković and Jović were sentenced to four and a half years each. The Supreme Military Court overturned the verdicts and ordered a retrial at which they were again found guilty. In late 2003, their sentences were increased to nine years for Petrovic and seven each for Stamenkovic and Jovic.

The first domestic "war crimes" trial in FRY regarding Kosovo occurred in 2001–02, against a former Yugoslav Army soldier called Ivan Nikolić. Initially indicted for murdering two ethnic Albanians in the Kosovan town of Podujevë on 24 May 1999, the indictment was changed to "a war crime against civilian population". Nikolic was sentenced to 8 years in prison.

==== Rahovec Case ====
In 1999, Boban Petković, a Yugoslav army reservist and Đorđe Simić, a policeman; Petković was first charged with having murdered 3 Albanian civilians in May 1999 in the village of Rija near Rahovec with Simić acting as an accomplice. In July 2000, a court in Požarevac found Petković guilty and sentenced him to 4 years and nine months in prison, while Simić was sentenced to one year for providing Petković with the gun he used in the killings.

Serbia's Supreme Court overturned the judgements in 2001 and ordered a retrial. At the new trial, where, according to the new procedure the individuals were indicted for a "war crime", the District Court of Pozarevac sentenced Petkovic to 5 years in prison with obligatory psychiatric assistance, while acquitting Simić of all charges. The Supreme Court again overturned the judgements in 2006. In February 2013, Petković was found guilty by the Požarevac High Court of committing a war crime against the civilian population and sentenced to 5 years. Upon appeal, the Court of Appeals in Belgrade reduced the sentence to three years in 2014, acquitting Petković of two of the murders citing mitigating circumstances. The Humanitarian Law Center criticized the reduction of sentence and said the case was: "one of dozens of cases which have remained under the jurisdiction of courts and prosecutions of general jurisdiction … In each of these cases … monitors noted obvious violations of the law, indifference and biased prosecutions … as well as a very mild penal policy".

==== Suva Reka trial ====
In 2006, the trial began of ex-policemen Milorad Nišavić and Slađan Čukarić and State security member Miroslav Petković. They were found guilty by the War Crimes Panel of the Belgrade High Court, of the murder of 49 or 50 Albanian civilians in Suva Reka on 26 March 1999, including a total of 48 members of the Berisha family. Nišavić was sentenced to 13 years, Petković 15 years and Čukarić 20 years in prison. Three other policemen were acquitted, while in a separate trial Suva Reka police commander Radojko Repanović was found guilty due to command responsibility and sentenced to 20 years of prison. Two other policemen were acquitted, as well as a 3rd one, against whom the prosecution had dropped the case mid-trial. In 2010 Belgrade's Appeal Court had confirmed all verdicts against the 6 directly responsible indicted, but dismissed Repanovic's verdict and ordered a retrial. One of the acquitted, the commander of the 37th Police Unit Radoslav Mitrović, remains in custody as of 2013 along with several other members suspect for other accounts of war crimes. Repanović was found guilty of the same charges and sentenced to 20 years in prison in late 2010 by Belgrade's War Crimes Panel and in 2011 Belgrade's Appeal Court confirmed the judgement.

==== More findings of war crimes ====
Slobodan Stojanovic, a retired commander of the Serbian police who is a protected witness of the Serbian state, testified on Radio Free Europe regarding a series of actions that were taken against Albanian civilians during 1998 which made him withdraw from the force. He stated that Serbian Senior Officials were informed about every action that Serbian Forces members had taken in Kosovo, through the chain of command that was called "territory's clearance".

"I have been everywhere and when I saw what was happening, I pulled out. Simply, without any reason, they would approach people and threaten them, by demanding money from them. If anyone lacked money, they would kill them, without any other reason" he said, explaining that he knew the names of those who had killed innocent people, saying "the only good Albanian is a dead Albanian". He accused his former commander, Nenad Stojkovic of burning villages in Mitrovica and other crimes. He has also talked about other cases, for which, no one has accepted responsibility.

=== Trials of KLA leaders ===
The ICTY also leveled indictments against KLA members Fatmir Limaj, Haradin Bala, Isak Musliu and Agim Murtezi, for crimes against humanity in relation to the prison camp run by the defendants at Lapušnik between May and July 1998. They were arrested in February 2003. Charges were soon dropped against Agim Murtezi as a case of mistaken identity. The court charged the other three for the torture, beatings and murders of Serb civilian detainees. Limaj and Musliu were acquitted of all charges on 30 November 2005 and released. Bala was convicted of torture and cruel treatment of the detainees and for the murder of nine prisoners on 25 or 26 July 1998. He was sentenced to 13 years and granted early release in 2012.

In March 2005, the ICTY indicted the-then Kosovo Prime Minister Ramush Haradinaj along with former KLA commander Idriz Balaj, and deputy commander Lahi Brahimaj for war crimes against Serbs and other civilians in a compound of the KLA in the village of Jablanica. On 8 March, Haradinaj tendered his resignation. Haridinaj and Balaj were acquitted on all counts, while Brahimaj was found guilty of one count of torture and another count of torture and cruel treatment and sentenced to six years. Haridinaj was recalled due to witness intimidation and the case faced a retrial. On 29 November 2012, all three were acquitted.

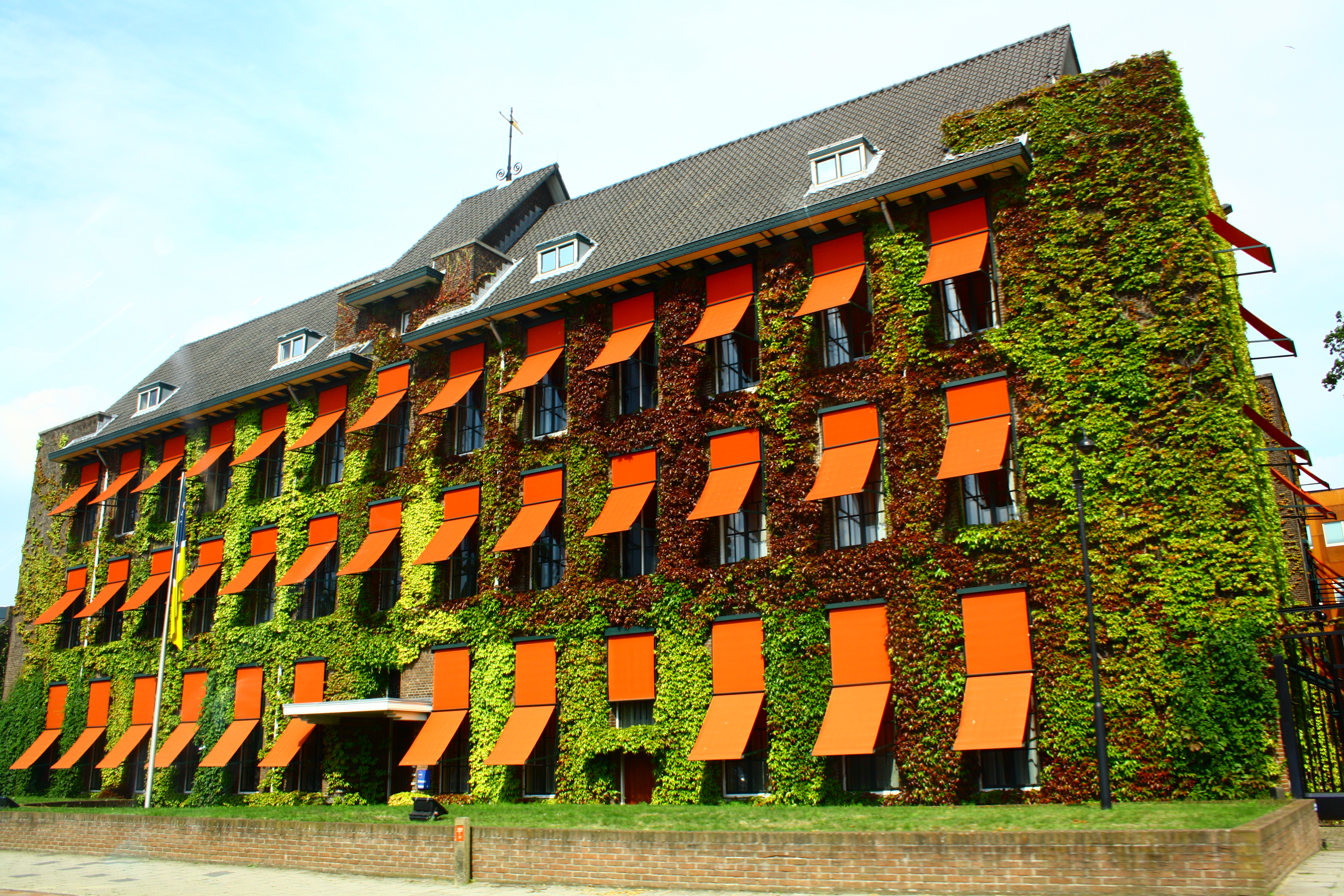
Kosovo Specialist Chambers

According to Human Rights Watch, senior leaders of the KLA accused of killings and body transfers to Albania remain at-large, some in high government posts.

In 2016, a court operating under Kosovan law, but located in the Hague, was established to investigate and prosecute crimes committed in 1999–2000 by members of the Kosovo Liberation Army against ethnic minorities and political opponents. In late September 2020, The Hague court began hearing cases against the background of tense relation between Kosovo and Serbia.

In June 2020, the Kosovan specialist court filed a ten-count Indictment, charging Kosovo President Hashim Thaçi, Kadri Veseli and others for crimes against humanity and war crimes. In November 2020, Thaci, Veseli, Rexhep Selimi, the president of the Kosovo Democratic Party, and veteran Kosovo politician Jakup Krasniqi were arrested and transferred to the detention center of the Kosovo Tribunal in The Hague to face trial. They were charged with the murders of 102 Serbs, Albanians, Roma and political opponents as part of a joint criminal enterprise. They were found guilty of war crimes and given prison sentences in September 2026.

In September 2020, Salih Mustafa, the former commander of the KLA's BIA Unit, was arrested and charged with being responsible for the torture and murder of "persons taking no active part in hostilities". In December 2022, Mustafa was found guilty of arbitrary detention, torture, and murder. He was sentenced to 26 years in prison.

=== Trials In Kosovo ===
On 19 July 2024, the Pristina Basic Court found an ex-policeman of Bosniak origin, Ekrem Bajrović, guilty of the murder and assault of Kosovo Albanian civilians in May 1999, sentencing him to 12 years in prison. Bajrović was one of several Serbian police and army personnel who took part in the abduction of 84 civilians on 7 May 1999 in the village of Saradran. The victims were taken to a police station in Gurakoc, where they were tortured. He also took part in the execution of 16 civilians in Saradran who were attempting to flee to Albania. Following a retrial, Bajrović's guilty verdict and 12-year sentence were upheld on 3 July 2026.

== See also ==
- 20th-century history of Kosovo
- Zllash torture

== Sources ==
- Abrahams, Fred; Ward, Benjamin (October 2001). Under Orders: War Crimes in Kosovo (PDF) (Report). Human Rights Watch. ISBN 9781564322647. Archived (PDF) from the original on 21 August 2021.
