= Mališevo mass grave =

Mass grave in Mališevo, Kosovo

Malisheva mass grave
- Part of Kosovo War
- Location: 42°28′58″N 20°44′46″E; Malisheva, Kosovo
- Date: 1998
- Target: Kosovo Serbs
- Attack type: Executions
- Deaths: 13
- Perpetrator: Kosovo Liberation Army
- Motive: Serbophobia
- Accused: Hashim Thaçi, Kadri Veseli, Jakup Krasniqi, Rexhep Selimi

The Mališevo mass grave is a grave found in 2005 in the town of Malisheva, Kosovo. The grave contained the bodies of 12 Serb civilians and 1 ethnic Bulgarian, executed during the Kosovo War by the Kosovo Liberation Army (KLA).

== Prelude ==
Between 17 and 20 July 1998, the KLA mounted a large-scale offensive in and around the town of Rahovec in western Kosovo. The KLA managed to abduct 85 Serb civilians during the offensive from local Serb villages and the Zočište Monastery. The offensive failed and during their retreat, the KLA released 45 Serb civilians in the days following the offensive, however approximately 40 remained in KLA detention.

== Massacre ==
According to an indictment filed by the Kosovo Specialist Chambers against former Kosovo President Hashim Thaçi, during the offensive in Orahovac on 17 July 1998, 11 Serb civilians captured by the KLA were transferred to the KLA stronghold of Mališevo. The 11 Serb civilians were placed in a basement of a building, housing two more detained civilians and were subsequently beaten by their KLA captors. On 19 July 1998, the prisoners were loaded into a van and were driven to a nearby location. The 13 prisoners were executed and subsequently buried.

== Aftermath ==
The grave was discovered in May 2005 close to the Mališevo hospital, approximately 100 meters from the main road leading through Mališevo. The discovery came one month after another mass grave was discovered consisting of 22 Serb civilians in the town of Klina. The 13 bodies were later identified as 12 Serbs and 1 ethnic Bulgarian, all men between the ages of 24 and 70. Four former senior KLA members including Kadri Veseli, Hashim Thaci, Jakup Krasniqi and Rexhep Selimi were indicted for various war crimes including the massacre of 13 civilians in Malisheva.

== See also ==
- Ugljare mass grave
- Batajnica mass graves
- Rudnica mass grave
