= Zllash torture =

Torture of civilians during the Kosovo war

- Part of Kosovo War and the aftermath
- Location: Kosovo, Zllash
- Date: April 1999
- Target: alleged collaborators, non-supporter of the KLA
- Attack type: murder, torture, and arbitrary detention
- Victims: 6 tortured 1 killed
- Perpetrator: Kosovo Liberation Army (UÇK): Guerilla BIA led by Salih Mustafa
- Motive: Albanian nationalism, Separatism
- Verdict: Guilty

The Zllash torture incident occurred during the Kosovo War, involving the torture of six individuals suspected of collaboration, ultimately resulting in the murder of one victim. The incident was carried out by the Kosovo Liberation Army (UÇK), specifically the Guerria-BIA unit under the leadership of Salih Mustafa.

In December 2022, the Kosovo Specialist Chambers, based in The Hague, found Mustafa guilty of war crimes and sentenced him to 26 years in prison. The judgement was appealed but quashed in December 2023, although his sentence was reduced to 22 years.

== Background ==
During the early stages of the Kosovo War, Salih Mustafa formed a special guerilla unit within the Kosovo Liberation Army (KLA) known as Skifterat also recognized as the Guerrilla BIA, which name "BIA" is an acronym formed from the initials of Bahri Fazliu, Ilir Konushevci, and Agron Rrahmani, who were deployed in the Operational Zone Llap and Gollak, including the village of Zllash, with an estimated unit strength of 500-600 members.

As the conflict intensified, Mustafa's unit engaged in guerrilla warfare tactics, conducting operations against Serbian forces and strategic targets. The Skifteraj unit operated clandestinely within enemy territories, coordinating with other KLA units to resist Serbian control and advance the cause of Kosovo's independence.

== Execution of torture ==
On April 18, 1999, Serbian forces launched an offensive against the KLA-held Marec Highlands, aiming to remove the KLA from the region and encircle their brigades. Exploiting adverse weather conditions, the Serbian forces attacked from multiple directions, resulting in intense battles across the area. Initially, Serbian forces clashed with fighters from the KLA's 153rd Brigade in Kukaj, where several Serb soldiers were killed, prompting a temporary retreat. However, Serbian artillery bombarded KLA positions during their withdrawal.

Despite facing heavy resistance, the KLA fighters managed to repel the Serbian forces on numerous occasions during their attempts to capture strategic points. Serbian forces suffered significant losses in both personnel and equipment, particularly along the Viti-Gerbesh line. Meanwhile, the KLA had the additional responsibility of providing protection and assistance to the civilian population that had fled from Pristina to the Marec Highlands, comprising approximately 80,000 inhabitants.

Following their losses in the battle, the Serbian command retaliated by targeting the civilian population of Makoc, resulting in the massacre of 153 people. Subsequently, the events surrounding the Battle of Marec set the stage for the subsequent atrocities, including the detention and torture of collaborators in Zllash.

=== Torture and murder ===
Salih Mustafa's involvement in the crimes extends to the brutal torture and murder of Albanian civilians during April 1999 in the detention center located in Zllash. Mustafa, along with other members of the BIA unit, actively participated in these atrocities as part of a joint criminal enterprise.

Evidence presented during investigations revealed that Mustafa not only gave orders but also directly engaged in the torture of two civilians. Moreover, he was present on multiple occasions at the detention center, overseeing and condoning the acts inflicted upon innocent detainees. The victims who endured suffering at the hands of Mustafa and his associates had been falsely accused of collaboration with Serbs, or not supporting the KLA.

== Aftermath ==
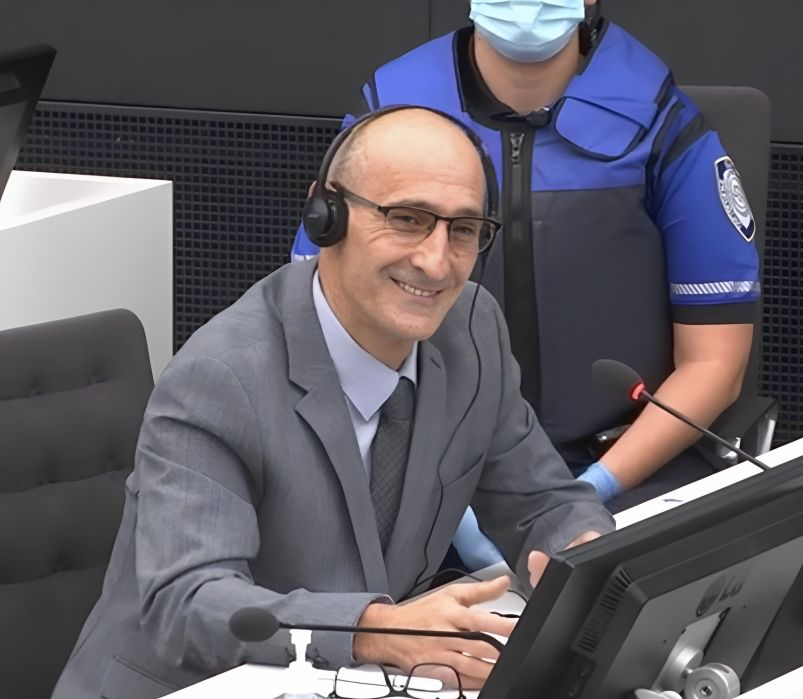
Salih Mustafa was brought before the Kosovo Specialist Chambers (2020), with plans to transfer him to The Hague

=== Trial of war crimes ===
In December 2022, the Kosovo Specialist Chambers, based in The Hague, found Mustafa guilty of war crimes; arbitrary detention, torture, and murder, and sentenced him to 26 years in prison. Mustafa was found guilty of operating a torture center where detainees were subjected to brutal treatment, including beatings, burns, and electric shocks. He personally interrogated and assaulted detainees, leading to the death of one victim who was denied medical care.

According to the court prosecutor Michalzuk, the victims were released on April 19, 1999, from Zllash, they were allegedly prevented from leaving along with another detainee. None of them were ever seen alive again. "Some time later, after an intense and painful search by family members, the victim's body was found in a shallow grave."

Mustafa, also known as "Commander Cali," had pleaded not guilty and compared the proceedings to a "Gestapo office," drawing a parallel to the notorious secret police of Nazi Germany. Additionally, he was ordered to pay compensation to his victims. This verdict marked a significant milestone for the Kosovo Specialist Chambers which was established in order to investigate and prosecute war crimes committed by the KLA, as it was the first war crimes judgment issued by the court.

Mustafa appealed the verdict, which was quashed in December 2023, however his original sentence of 26 years was reduced to 22 years. The presiding judge, Michele Picard, stated that the reduced sentence still reflects the seriousness of Mustafa's crimes. The court noted that comparable war crimes cases both in Kosovo and internationally had resulted in shorter sentences than initially imposed on Mustafa.
