= Kai Ambos =

German jurist and judge

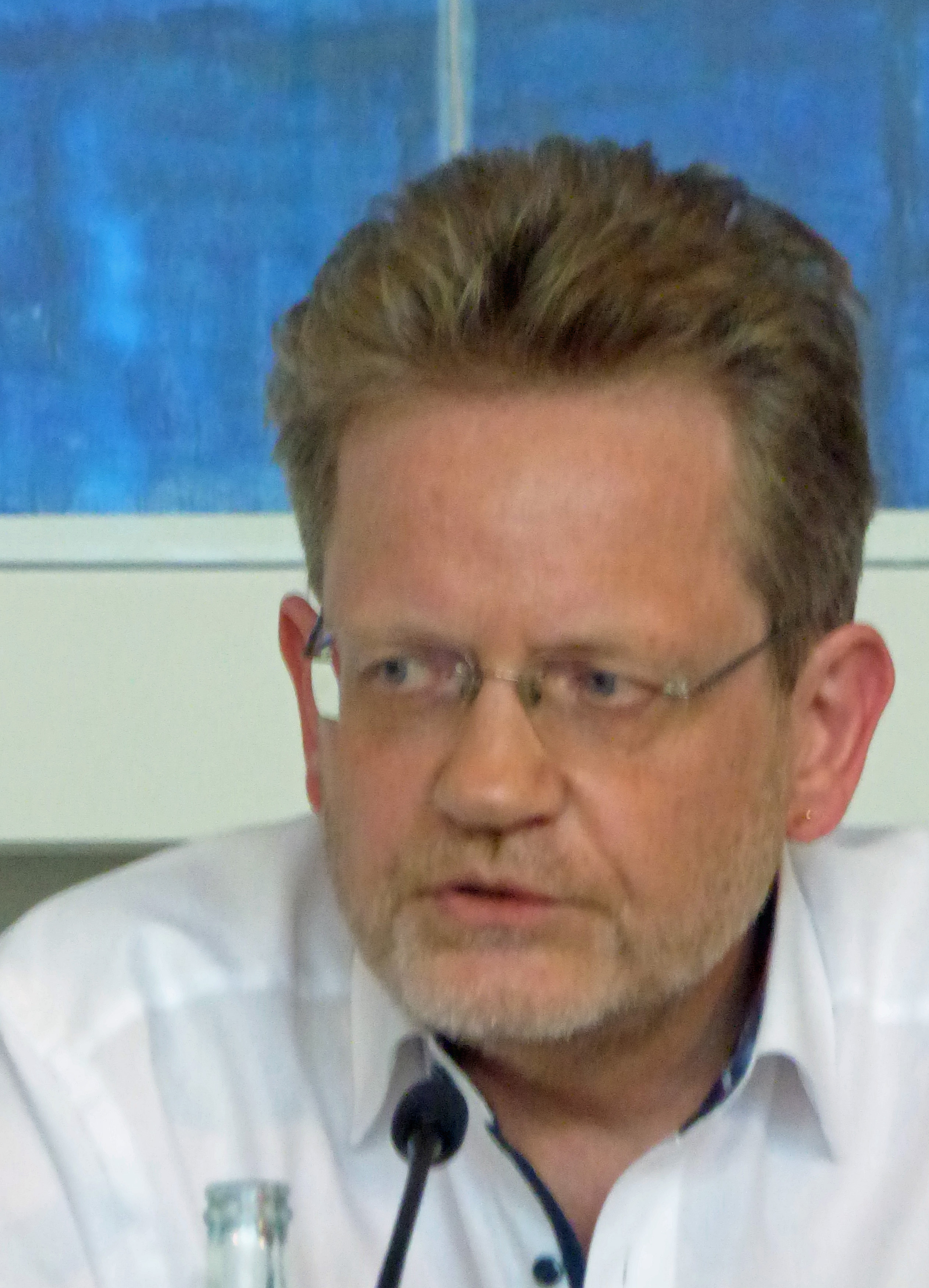
Ambos

Kai Ambos (born 29 March 1965) is a German jurist and judge. He holds the teaching chair at the University of Göttingen in criminal law, criminal procedure, comparative law and international criminal law. He served as a judge at the District Court for Lower Saxony between 2006 and 2017. In February 2017, he was appointed to serve as a judge on the Kosovo Specialist Chambers, a specialized hybrid criminal tribunal located in The Hague. He has authored and edited numerous publications on criminal law and procedure in Germany and internationally.

In 2011, he argued that the killing of Osama bin Laden was "both illegal and morally dubious".

== Biography ==
Kai Ambos was born in Heidelberg. He studied Law and Political sciences at the University of Freiburg, the University of Oxford and LMU Munich, where he passed his Level I law exams in 1990. His doctorate, also received from LMU Munich, and supervised by Horst Schüler-Springorum, followed just two years later. His dissertation, subsequently published under the auspices of the Max Planck Institute, concerned problems of drug control in Colombia, Peru and Bolivia. On 27 October 1997, he received the "Law and Development Prize" from the "Herbert Krüger foundation for overseas constitutional comparison" for it. Meanwhile, he passed his Level II law exams in 1994.

After that he worked as an academic research assistant at the Max Planck Institute for foreign and international criminal law and as an academic research assistant at the University of Freiburg under the direction of Prof. Dr. Albin Eser, with whom he has subsequently collaborated on a succession of academic projects. In 2001, his habilitation (like his doctorate) was awarded by LMU Munich. It was supervised by Profs. Klaus Volk and Simma, and addressed "General aspects of International criminal law" ("Allgemeinen Teil des Völkerstrafrechts"). It was subsequently published. The habilitation cleared the way for a lifelong career in the universities sector, and he accepted a teaching chair at the University of Freiburg. That appointment was a relatively brief one, however, since at the start of 2003 he moved to the University of Göttingen where he continues (in 2024) to occupy the teaching chair in criminal law, criminal procedure, comparative law and international criminal law.

Kai Ambos served as a judge in the district court in Göttingen for more than ten years, his appointment taking effect on 24 March 2006.

Beyond the academic world, he came to national and international attention as a member of the defense team for Mladen Markač at the International Criminal Tribunal for the former Yugoslavia in the case of Gotovina et al.. More than ten years after the official indictment, on 16 November 2012, the case ended, on appeal, with an acquittal for Markač and his co-defendants, by a majority verdict of the panel judges. The outcome gave rise to many media discussions: Ambos himself admitted that he had been very much surprised by the eleventh hour acquittal.

In 2013, Ambos received an honorary doctorate from the Universidad Nacional de la Amazonía Peruana in northern Peru for "services to criminal justice and criminal process and his commitment to reform of the justice systems in Peru and other Latin American countries". In January 2014 a "Research Centre for Latina American criminal law and criminal procedure" ("Centro de Estudios de Derecho Penal y Procesal Penal Latinoamericano" / CEDPAL) was inaugurated at Göttingen under the auspices of Ambos' professorship. He serves currently as its "Director General". The research centre is supported by its own academic advisory council and a specialist library containing more than 12,000 titles.

On 7 February 2017, Ambos was appointed to serve as a judge on the Kosovo Specialist Chambers in The Hague.

In 2024, Kai Ambos became entangled in a significant legal scandal in Chile involving payments for his legal services. This controversy is part of a broader investigation into Luis Hermosilla, a powerful and influential Chilean lawyer accused of handling illicit funds, including potential money laundering, to defend former Interior Minister Andres Chadwick; Chadwick faced allegations of human rights violations during the presidency of Sebastian Pinera, particularly related to his role during the social unrest known as the "Estallido Social" in 2019. Hermosilla allegedly used funds provided by businessman Daniel Sauer to pay Ambos for a legal report that was crucial in Chadwick's defense during his constitutional accusation. The substantial financial transactions involved are currently under scrutiny to determine if they were linked to illegal activities, resulting in Hermosilla's imprisonment in August 2024.

== More opinions ==
In 2012, he expressed his satisfaction over the appeals chamber's unanimous decision to overturn the "200 Meter Standard" during the trial of Gotovina et al. He also stated that he thought "Gotovina was a professional soldier" who sought to minimize civilian casualties and war damages (referring to documents used during the trial), and that "he couldn't see a butcher of Serbs in Markac either." He urged the Croats not to overinterpret the verdict and pretend that no crimes were committed during Operation Storm.

In 2012, Kai Ambos argued that the "misuse" by the Ecuadorian government of its London embassy to protect Julian Assange from prosecution in Sweden in respect of rape charges was a breach of human rights. Pointing out that Assange had been able to arrange matters so that it had taken three English courts a year and a half to reach the point at which they were about to extradite Assange, Ambos went on to highlight ways in which the parties had been able to politicise the affair, and he set out ways in which the case highlighted that in practice the European Arrest Warrant system was being implemented very much more robustly in some member states than in others.

In 2015, he addressed the matter of the Armenian genocide. Setting aside the continuing heated debates over whether the term was "politically correct", he invited consideration of whether it was "legally correct", pointing out that the necessity to prove "destructive intent" ("Zerstörungsabsicht") on the part of the Ottoman government presented formidable challenges.
