= Rudnica mass grave =

Grave containing multiple number of human corpses

The Rudnica mass grave is a site in Rudnica, southern Serbia where Kosovo Albanian victims of Serbian operations were transferred from several areas in Kosovo and buried in the site during the Kosovo War. The grave contains remains of 250 individuals.

The site was first examined in 2007 and research continued in the next years under the supervision of a team of forensic experts from the European Union Rule of Law Mission in Kosovo, the International Commission on Missing Persons, the International Criminal Tribunal for the former Yugoslavia and other missions. They were joined by teams from Kosovan and Serbian authorities. The site of the grave was not found until 13 December 2013. Excavations lasted until 22 August 2014. The bodies of 52 individuals were recovered. Repatriations of the remains began in December 2014. The investigation revealed broad links to state authorities and the army in Serbia for the killings and transfer of victims out of Kosovo and their burial in Rudnica and other sites. Vladimir Vukčević, Serbian War Crimes Prosecutor announced that Ljubiša Diković and others were under investigation. Tomislav Nikolić supported Diković and the investigation didn't continue. A law dubbed Lex Vukčević was passed in the Serbian parliament in 2014 and led Vukčević to retirement. He has linked the passing of the law and his retirement to the investigation of the War Crimes Office and the links it revealed to senior Serbian officials. In total, 1,000 Albanians have been found in mass graves in Serbia since the end of the Kosovo War. More than 1,100 are reported missing out of a total 1,600 missing in the war. New excavations revealed human remains in Kizevak, not far from Rudnica, in November 2020. No one has been put to trial in Serbia. The ICTY has convicted Vlastimir Đorđević for his role in concealing the bodies of Albanians found in mass graves.

== See also ==
- War crimes in the Kosovo War
- Batajnica mass graves
- Ugljare mass grave
