= Suva Reka massacre =

1999 massacre of Kosovo Albanians by Serbian police in Suva Reka, Kosovo

Coordinates: 44°06′N 19°18′E

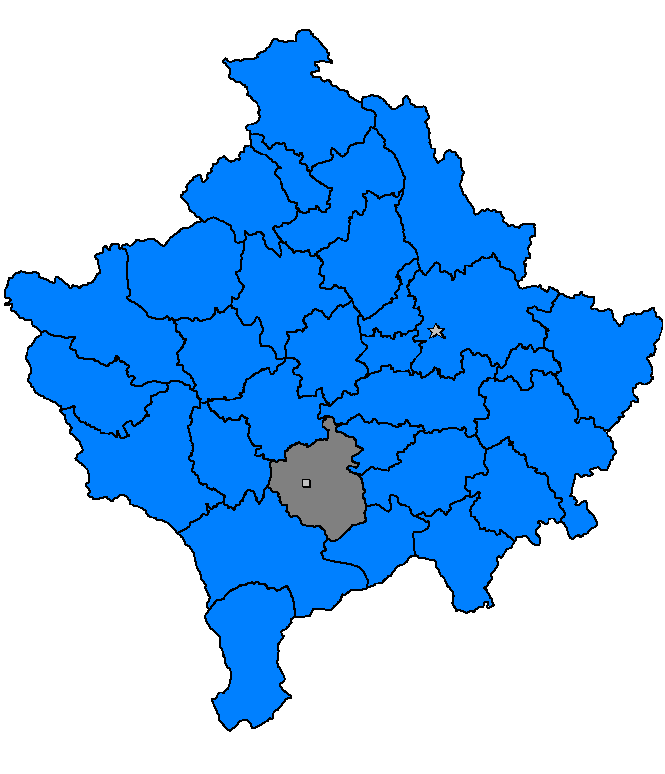
- Location of Suva Reka in Kosovo.
- Location: Suva Reka, Kosovo, FR Yugoslavia
- Date: 26 March 1999
- Target: Berisha family
- Attack type: Mass killing
- Deaths: 48
- Perpetrator: Serbian law enforcement

The Suva Reka massacre (Albanian: Masakra e Suharekës, Serbian: Masakr u Suvoj Reci) refers to the mass murder of Kosovo Albanian civilians committed by Serbian police officers on 26 March 1999 in Suva Reka, Kosovo, during the 1999 NATO bombings of Yugoslavia.

== Massacre ==
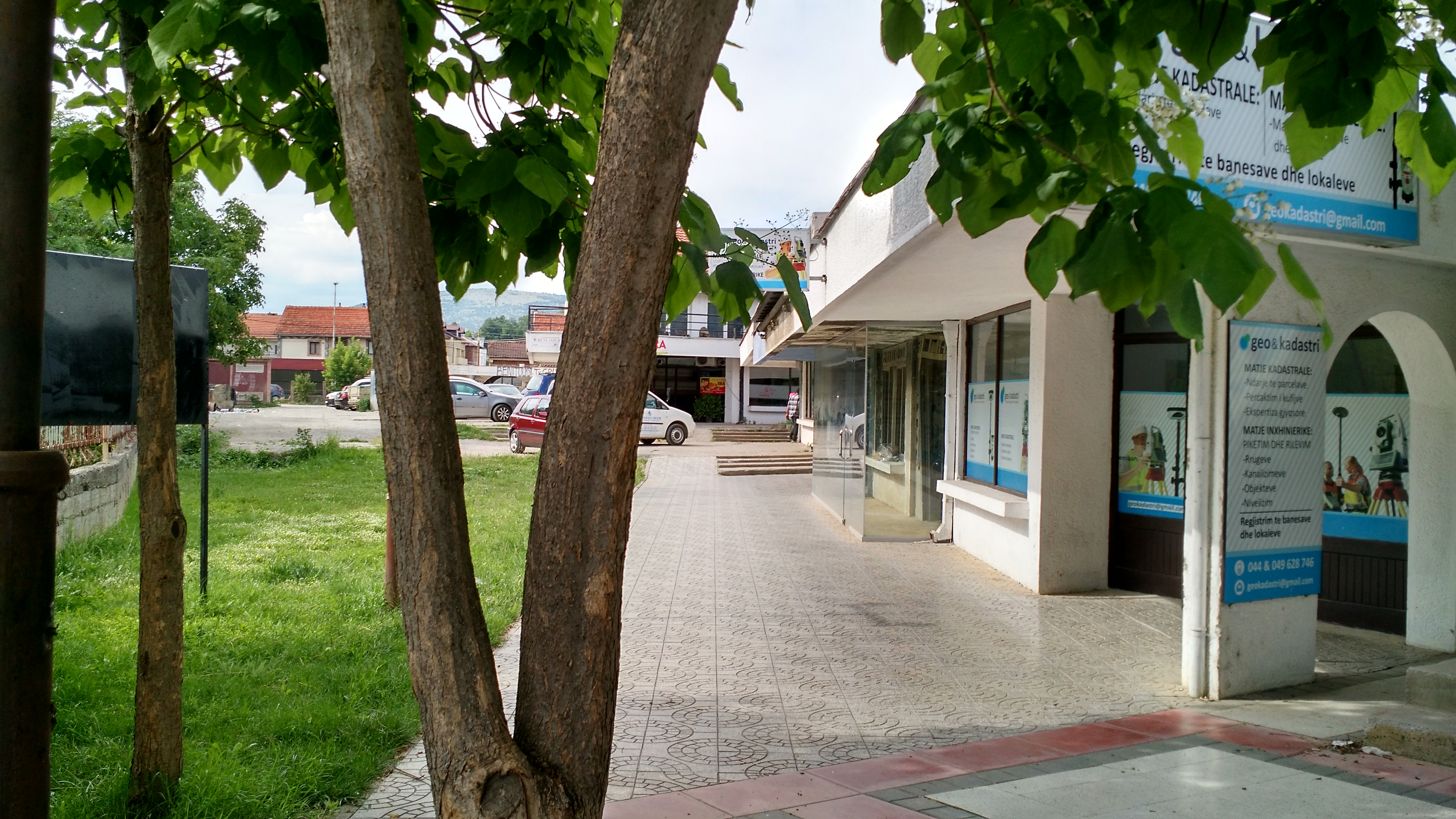
Sidewalk in front of the massacre location, June 2017

There were 48 victims of the Suva Reka massacre, including fourteen who were under 15 years old. Forty-six were members of the Berisha family - who were targeted because they had rented one of their homes to the OSCE observers in Suva Reke/Suharekë, who provided a sense of security to the local Albanians but withdrew from the area when NATO bombing began. A woman and two children survived the massacre. The victims were locked inside a pizzeria into which two hand grenades were thrown. Before taking the bodies out of the pizzeria, the police allegedly shot anyone still showing signs of life. The bodies of the victims were later transported to Serbia and buried in mass graves near a police facility at Batajnica, near Belgrade.

== Aftermath ==
The investigation into the Suva Reka massacre started three years after the mass graves in Serbia had been discovered. More than 100 witnesses were questioned during the trial, including Shyhrete Berisha, who survived the crime by jumping out of the truck that was transporting the corpses. Serbia's War Crimes prosecutor has charged eight policemen for the massacre, including members of the 37th SPU of the Serbian MUP. Key witnesses of the Office of the Prosecutor are former police members who are able to describe in detail the murder of Albanian civilians and the removal of their bodies from Suharekë.

After a three-year trial, a War Crimes court found four former policemen guilty of the massacre and sentenced two of them to a maximum of 20 years in jail, one to 15 years and another to 13 years. However, the Serbian War Crimes prosecutors said that they would appeal the verdicts, especially because the prime suspect — the commander of the unit that carried out the massacre — was acquitted. Suhareka is the first war crimes case in Serbia related to the mass graves discovered after Slobodan Milošević's ouster.

== See also ==
- List of massacres in the Kosovo War
- War crimes in Kosovo
