= Bajram Kelmendi =

Albanian lawyer and activist (1937–1999)

- Born: 1937; Peja, Kingdom of Yugoslavia
- Died: 24 March 1999 (aged 61–62); Pristina, FR Yugoslavia
- Occupation: Lawyer

Bajram Kelmendi (1937 – 24 March 1999) was an ethnic Albanian lawyer and human rights activist in Kosovo, Yugoslavia.

== Life ==
He was born into an ethnic Albanian family near Peja, part of the Kingdom of Yugoslavia (now Kosovo). His surname is derived from an ancestor hailing from the Kelmend region in northwest Albania. At the age of eighteen (in 1955), he was sentenced to one year in prison for criticizing the forced immigration of Albanians to Turkey. Later he studied law.

Kelmendi was among the founders of Council for Defense of Human Rights and Freedoms in Pristina and on 3 May 1998 filed charges at the International Criminal Tribunal for the Former Yugoslavia (ICTY) in The Hague against Slobodan Milošević for crimes committed in Kosovo. At the beginning for the bombing campaign of the North Atlantic Treaty Organization (NATO), on 24 March 1999, the Serbian police broke into his home and arrested him and his two sons, Kastriot and Kushtrim. When his wife Nekibe asked the policemen about their location, they responded by telling her "to ask NATO". The next day their bodies were found shot dead in a gas station near Pristina. An eyewitness of the murder reported that Kelmendi before his death was asked to kill one of his sons and vice versa. As the orders of the policemen were refused they killed Kastriot and Kushtrim and about thirty seconds later Bajram Kelmendi. Before his death Kelmendi had defended many political prisoners as well as an Albanian-language newspaper closed by the Serbian police.

After the war, Nekibe Kelmendi (1944–2011) was elected a deputy of the Democratic League of Kosovo and served as Minister of Justice of Kosovo from 2008 to 2010.

== See also ==
- First women lawyers around the world
