= Rudnica (Raška) =

Rudnica Рудница
- Village (Selo)
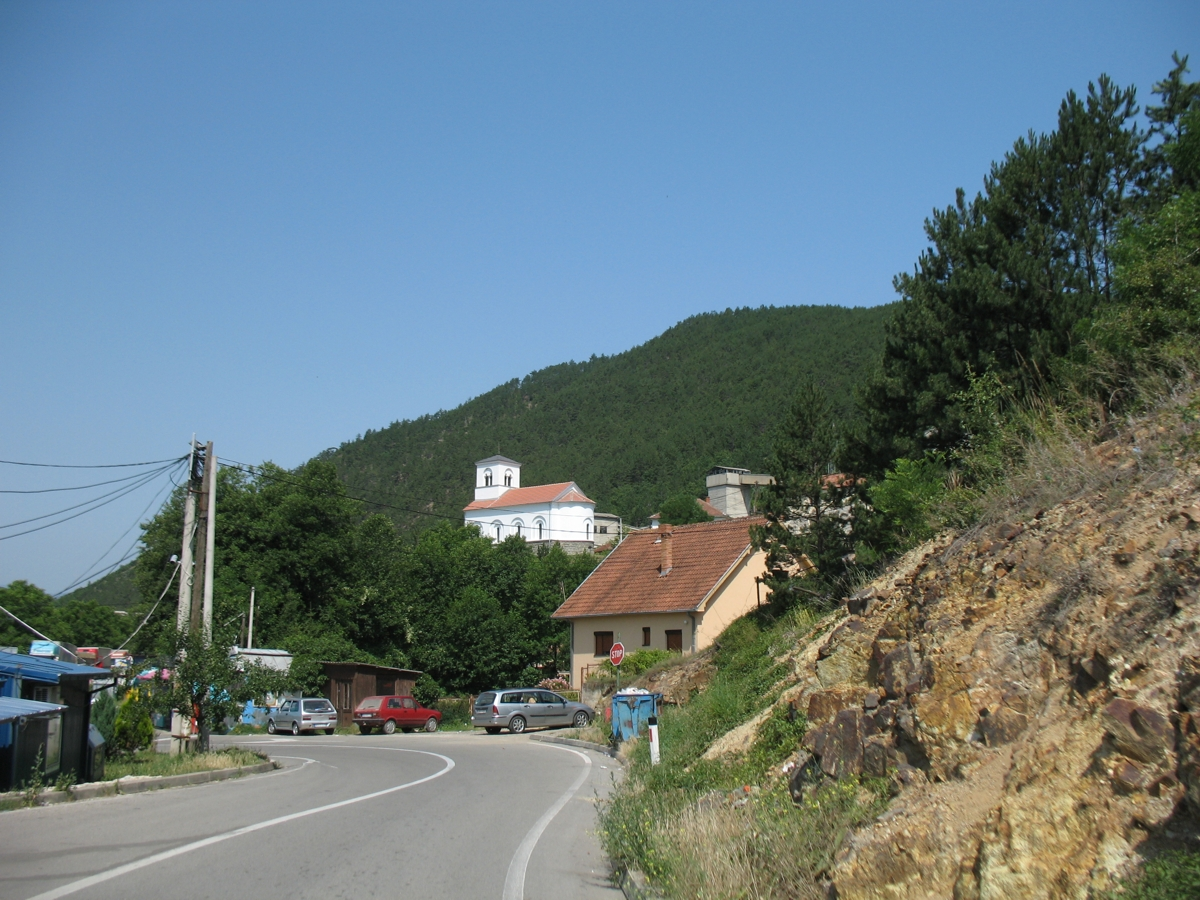
- View on Rudnica

- Location within Serbia
- Coordinates: 43°14′N 20°41′E
- Country: Serbia
- District: Raška District
- Municipality: Raška

Population (2011)
  - Total: 332
- Time zone: UTC+1 (CET)
  - Summer (DST): UTC+2 (CEST)

Rudnica (Serbian Cyrillic: Рудница) is a village in the municipality of Raška, Serbia.

== Demographics ==
According to the 2011 census, the village had a population of 332 people. According to the 2002 census, the village had a population of 300 people, 99% of whom were ethnic Serbs.

== Mass grave ==
In May 2010 and December 2013, human remains were excavated from a mass grave, belonging to an estimated 250 Kosovo Albanians killed in the Kosovo War (1998–99).
