= Salih Mustafa =

Former Kosovo Liberation Army commander

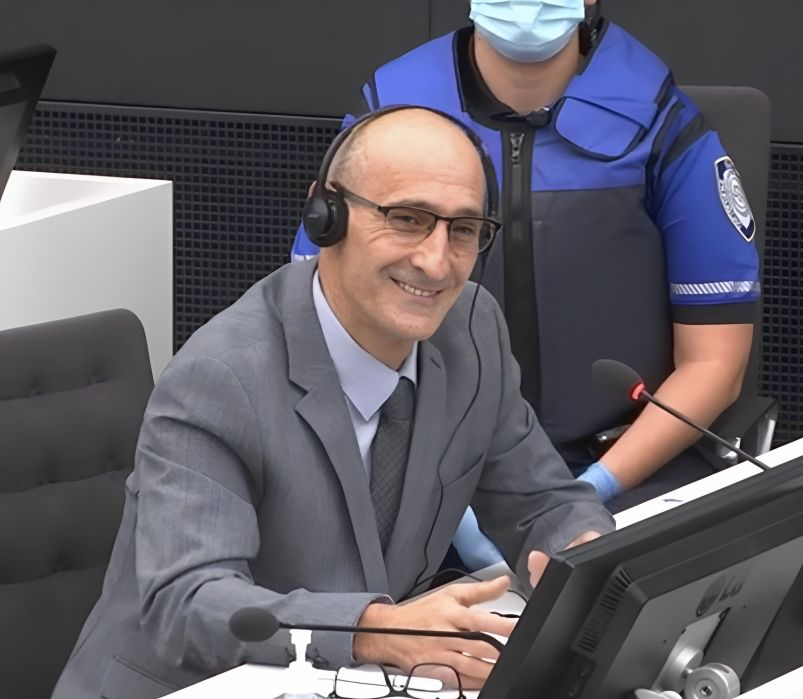
- Salih Mustafa during the Kosovo Special Court (2020)
- Born: 1 January 1972 (age 54); Pristina, Socialist Autonomous Province of Kosovo, Socialist Federal Republic of Yugoslavia
- Military career
- Allegiance: Kosovo
- Branch: National Movement for the Liberation of Kosovo; Kosovo Liberation Army; Kosovo Protection Corps; Kosovo Security Force
- Service years: Before 1993 (NMLK), 1993–1999 (KLA), 1999–2020 (KPC/KSF)
- Rank: Commander
- Nickname: Commander Cali
- Unit: BIA
- Conflicts: Kosovo War * Battle of Marec
- Criminal information
- Criminal charges: War crimes of arbitrary detention, cruel treatment, torture, and murder
- Penalty: 15 years of imprisonment

Salih Mustafa also known by the nickname "Cali", (born 1 January 1972) is a former Kosovo Albanian war commander of the Kosovo Liberation Army (KLA) who was affiliated with the BIA intelligence unit, which operated in the Llap region operative zone, particularly in parts of Gollak, Zllash during the Kosovo War. He was also the founder and leader of the Albanian nationalist and Communist National Movement for the Liberation of Kosovo and the former intelligence chief of the Kosovo Security Force (KSF). In 2022, he was convicted of war crimes by the Kosovo Specialist Chambers in The Hague and eventually sentenced to 15 years imprisonment.

== Early life and education ==
Mustafa was born on 1 January 1972 in the city of Pristina in Kosovo, then part of Yugoslavia. He completed studies in economics and following the end of the Kosovo War, he served as an adviser in the Kosovar Ministry of Defence.

== Kosovo War ==
During the Kosovo War, Mustafa served with the KLA as a commander of a guerrilla unit operating in the Llap region of Kosovo. He was a commander in the Battle of Marec. In 2021, Mustafa was charged for war crimes for acts committed against Kosovo Albanian civilians detained in the detention compound in Zllash in April 1999.

== Trial and conviction ==
Mustafa was indicted for war crimes by the Kosovo Specialist Chambers. The indictment charged Mustafa with "arbitrary detention … cruel treatment … torture … and murder" of civilians in 1999, in particular ordering prisoners to be tortured at an internment camp in Zllash/Zlaš. Mustafa's trial began on 15 September 2021 and was the first heard by the Kosovo Specialist Chambers. Prosecutors said that witnesses would testify at the trial that Mustafa had tortured them or had ordered their torture.

In December 2022, he was convicted of the war crimes of arbitrary detention, torture, and murder, but not convicted of cruel treatment as the panel considered the allegation to have been subsumed into the charge of torture. He was sentenced to 26 years in prison.

The verdict and sentence were criticized by some Kosovan Albanians.

In December 2023, the "Court of appeals chamber" confirmed his convictions and reduced his sentence to 22 years of imprisonment.

On September 10, 2024, the Appeals Panel in its new decision further reduced Mr. Mustafa's sentence to 15 years of imprisonment.

== See also ==
- List of Albanian rebels
- List of convicted war criminals
