= Vasfije Krasniqi Goodman =

Kosovar activist and rape survivor

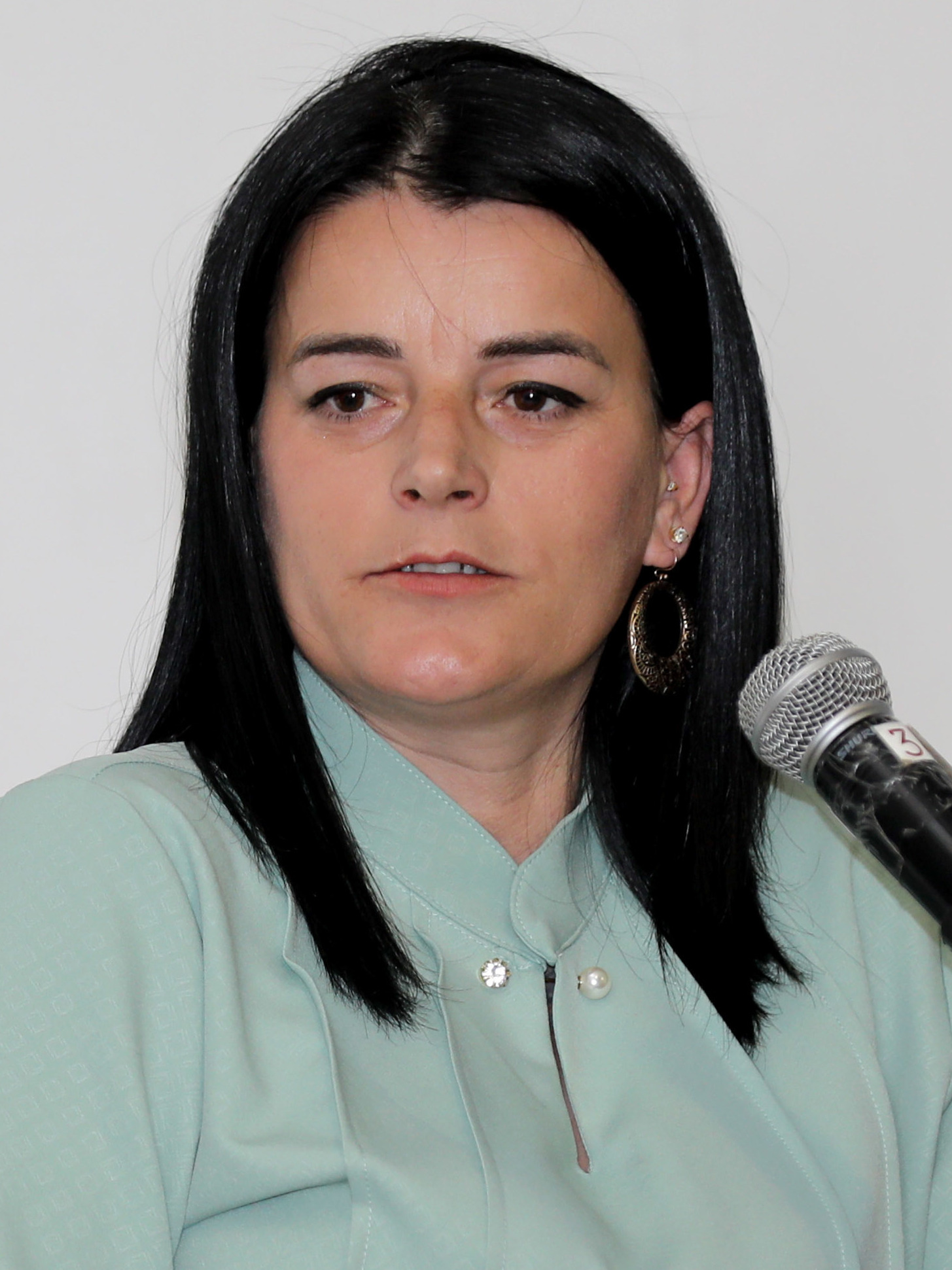
- Krasniqi in 2022
- Born: Vasfije Krasniqi; Stanoci i Ulet, Vushtrri, Kosovo, Yugoslavia
- Occupations: Activist, politician
- Children: 2

Vasfije Krasniqi Goodman is a Kosovo Albanian activist, a politician serving in the Assembly of the Republic of Kosovo, and a survivor of rape.

== Life and career ==
=== Sexual assault and Kosovo War ===
At the time of the Kosovo War, Krasniqi was living with her family in the small village of Stanoci i Ulet in Vushtrri. On April 14, 1999, when Krasniqi was sixteen years old, a Serbian officer arrived at their house and demanded to know where Krasniqi's father and brother were. Her mother told the officer that they were in Germany, but the officer did not believe her. He entered the house and took Krasniqi, telling her that he was taking her to the police station to give a statement, however, the officer took her to the village of Babimoc, which was populated primarily by Serbs, and raped her. Krasniqi stated that the officer told her "You will pay for what your father and brother have done." A few hours later, Krasniqi was raped again by another Serb. The officer then returned her to her house. At first, she did not share the incident with anyone but later reported the case to the Kosovo Liberation Army.

From Kosovo’s Wartime Victims: The Quest for Justice, Hearing Before the United States House Committee on Foreign Affairs, 2019 Congressional Record, Vol. 165, Page 65 (April 3, 2019):

On April 14th, 1999 when I was only sixteen years old, a Serbian police officer barged into my house. He was looking for my father and my brothers. However, they were not at home. I was there with my mother, my aunt, and my two cousins. The policeman ordered us to show him our IDs. After taking a look at my ID he kept it and told me that I had to go to the police station with him to give a statement about the men of our household...The Serbian police officer then ripped me away from my mother's arms and took me to a Serbian village nearby. He walked me into an empty house, just off of the main road and threw me onto dried corn stacks that were piled up against the house. I started to yell. I screamed at the top of my lungs. That's when he took me to his car and started to rape me.

In 2012, the Basic Prosecution in Pristina issued an indictment for her case. Two Kosovo Serbs, Jovica Dejanovic and Djordje Bojkovic, were accused of war crimes against civilians and of raping Krasniqi. On April 4, 2013, the Basic Court of Mitrovica, composed of three EULEX judges, began their judicial review of the case. Over seven days they heard from twelve witnesses. Nine witnesses were called by the prosecution. On April 13, the court acquitted Dejanovic and Bojkovic of the charges due to legal violations in the course of the investigation phase regarding the identification of the men by Krasniqi and other witnesses. The court said that the process used to identify Dejanovic and Bojkovic through photos contained irregularities, and that photographic identification could not be used as evidence. The prosecution appealed, to the Court of Appeal of Kosovo. The Court of Appeal determined that the witness' identifications of Dejanovic and Bojkovic had been regular and provided proof that was both sufficient and convincing. On May 17, 2014, the court issued a decision, stating that there was sufficient proof of the guilt regarding Dejanovic and Bojkovic. Dejanovic was sentenced to 12 years in prison and Bojkovic was sentenced to ten years. Dejanovic and Bojkovic filed a complaint against the appeal court’s decision, and the Kosovo Supreme Court annulled the verdict and acquitted both men of the accused of war crimes.

The Humanitarian Law Center monitored Krasniqi’s case and published a report in 2014, "High profile trials: Justice Delayed," claiming there were a number of violations and that the Basic Court of Mitrovica had handled the case poorly. Krasniqi later stated that no attorney from Kosovo would agree to represent her, EULEX would not provide the attorneys the protection necessary to work in the north of Kosovo, which has a Serb-Majority.

In 2019, Kosovo’s Special Prosecutor Drita Hajdari stated that she had attempted to find a legal basis to reopen Krasniqi's case, was unsuccessful. In April 2021, Kosovo President Vjosa Osmani declared April 14, the day of Krasniqi's rape, the "Day of Sexual Violence Survivors".

=== Activism and political career ===
After the war, Krasniqi moved to Texas in the United States. In 2015, she travelled to Kosovo to share her story publicly on national television, without hiding her identity. She was the first wartime rape survivor in Kosovo to do so. On April 30, 2019, Krasniqi spoke to the United States House Committee on Foreign Affairs, in a hearing titled "Kosovo’s Wartime Victims: The Quest for Justice," testifying that the United States should push for justice for victims of war crimes. On March 9, 2020, Krasniqi spoke to the Assembly of the Republic of Kosovo about how they could support survivors of wartime sexual violence.

In February 2021, Krasniqi ran for a seat in the 2021 Kosovan parliamentary election as a member of the Vetëvendosje Party. She received 61,885 votes, winning a seat, and Krasniqi moved back to Kosovo.

In April 2021, Krasniqi met with Kosovo President Vjosa Osmani to memorialize the day of Krasniqi's rape, with President Osmani declaring April 14 the "Day of Sexual Violence Survivors".

== Personal life ==
Krasniqi has two daughters, who were born in the United States.
