= Ugljare mass grave =

Mass grave in Ugljare, Kosovo

- Location: Ugljare, Gjilan municipality, Kosovo, Yugoslavia
- Date: July 1999
- Target: Kosovo Serbs and possibly Albanians
- Attack type: Mass killing
- Deaths: 15

The Ugljare mass grave is a grave found in the village of Ugljare in the Kosovo municipality of Gjilan. Those buried include Kosovo Serbs and possibly Kosovo Albanians sometime around July 1999. At the time, it was the only case which involved in the Kosovo war crimes tribunal the investigation of a crime against civilians which was possibly committed by Albanians against Serbs. No perpetrators have been found.

== Massacre ==
On 24 July 1999, U.S soldiers as part of KFOR discovered the bodies after local villagers reported the existence of a mass grave. According to one local villager, the mass grave was very shallow with one victim being that of a child, in addition to the site being littered with spent cartridges. The site was reported to the International Criminal Tribunal for the former Yugoslavia with investigations conducted between 8 and 11 August 1999. The bodies were exhumed and later taken to a nearby chapel.

== Aftermath ==
The burial sited was widely reported a month after it was discovered, prompting the Yugoslav government to accuse U.S. KFOR forces of trying to cover-up the massacre. In a letter to the President of the United Nations Security Council, the Yugoslav government claimed that the victims were all Serbs. The Yugoslav government claimed that three of them had been kidnapped "by the terrorists from the ranks of the so-called Kosovo Liberation Army (KLA)".

A NATO spokesperson initially confirmed that four of the bodies were identified as Serbs, however the statement was later retracted. In a later statement NATO reported that they could not confirm if any of the bodies included Serbs or Albanians. The public affairs office of the American troops in the region issued a statement which designated the victims buried in the site as Serbs who were killed after the war and Albanians who were killed before the war. The spokesman of Hague war crimes tribunal reported that two of the bodies might belong to Kosovo Serbs who were kidnapped after war.

An OSCE investigation shortly after the massacre reported that six of the bodies were identified as Serbs, kidnapped from nearby Livoci i Poshtem and Ranilug. Ugljare reportedly housed a KLA detention facility and further investigations by KFOR led to the arrest of a KLA member who denied any involvement in the killings.

In August 2018, a UN team scanned the site and nearby fields during a research mission for potential mass grave sites in Kosovo.

== See also ==
- Batajnica mass graves
- Rudnica mass grave
