= Batajnica mass graves =

Mass graves of murdered Albanians in Batajnica, Serbia

Mass graves found in Serbia

The Batajnica mass graves are mass graves that were found in 2001 near Batajnica, a suburb of Belgrade, the capital of Serbia. The graves contained the bodies of 744 Kosovar Albanians civilians that were killed during the Kosovo War. The mass graves were found on the training grounds of the Yugoslav Special Anti-Terrorist Unit (SAJ). Dead bodies were brought to the site by trucks from Kosovo; most were incinerated before burial. After the war, SAJ restricted investigators' access to the firing range, and continued live-firing exercises whilst forensic teams tried to investigate the massacre.

== Background ==
The Humanitarian Law Center (HLC), a nongovernmental organization based in Serbia and Kosovo, published in their research that the total number of killed during the Kosovo war (a length of time in the research studied from January 1998 to December 31, 2000) estimated at 13,517, when of this number of all killed or missing civilians were: 8 661 Kosovo Albanians, 1797 Serbs, 447 Roma, Bosniaks, and other ethnic minorities.

Milica Kostić, who is a former researcher at the HLC and currently working at the International Coalition of Sites of Conscience, said in 2019 that still estimated over 1,600 people missing after the war of in Kosovo, from them: 1,100 Kosovo Albanians, around 450 Serbs, and over 100 Bosniak and Roma victims.

== Discovery of mass graves ==
The work of investigating the Batajnica mass grave began approximately in June 2001 when Serbian Ministry of Internal Affairs showed the short video of the exhumation of parts of bodies in the Police Training camp located near the town of Batajnica. The mentions of a mass grave discovered in Batajnica started to appear in the newspapers on September 19, 2001, when first 269 bodies were exhumed.

The Humanitarian Law Center (HLC), a human rights non-governmental organisation, documenting human rights violations happened on the territories of former Yugoslavia, said in the dossier "The Concealment of Bodies Operation", that 5 mass graves were discovered in Serbia: at Batajnica (744 bodies — discovered in 2001), Kiževak (17 bodies discovered in 2020), Lake Perućac (84 bodies — discovered in 2001), Petrovo Selo (61 bodies — discovered in 2001), and at Rudnica, a village near the border with Kosovo (52 bodies — discovered in 2013).

The HLC said in the dossier "The Concealment of Bodies Operation", that the bodies of Kosovo Albanians were also secretly burned in two locations in Serbia: the Mačkatica Aluminium Complex near Surdulica, the Copper Mining And Smelting Complex in Bor. Also, HLC called the Feronikl Plant in Glogovac, where bodies of Kosovo Albanians were burned, that located in Kosovo's Drenica region.

== Victims found ==
Location	Date found/excavations	identified victims	Victims	Perpetrators
Batajnica	June, 2001	744	Kosovo Albanian civilians	Serbian police and military
Kizevak	November, 2020	17	Kosovo Albanian civilians	Serbian police and military
Lake Perucac	July, 2001	84	Kosovo Albanian civilians	Serbian police and security forces
Petrovo Selo	June, 2001	61	Kosovo Albanian civilians	Serbian police
Rudnica	December, 2013	52	Kosovo Albanian civilians	Serbian police and military

== Press about the covert operation ==
As the Guardian's diplomatic editor Julian Borger claimed in his article in 2010:

Serb forces conducted mass killings in ethnic Albanian villages in 1998 and 1999, burying most of the victims close to the site of the killing. But when it became clear that Nato would intervene, the Milošević government ordered the bodies to be dug up and moved elsewhere in Serbia and Serb-controlled Bosnia.

Dejan Anastasijević, an investigative journalist of the Serbian weekly Vreme, said in 2010 about the bodies found near an SAJ base in Batajnica, that there was the "sanitation" programme, involving the removal of thousands of bodies, that was carried out by Serbia's special counter-terrorist unit, SAJ, to hide war crimes.

== Investigation ==
=== Vlastimir Đorđević's trial in ICTY ===
Vlastimir Đorđević, who was a Serbian deputy interior minister during Kosovo conflict in Kosovo in 1998 and 1999, was under trial in the International Criminal Tribunal for the Former Yugoslavia (ICTY) in 2010 for his role in crimes against Kosovo Albanians, where he admitted that he knew about transferring bodies from one truck found in Danube, and burned bodies found in the second truck in the Lake Perućac, but he didn't know about actual killings. The two trucks were found with bodies of Kosovo Albanians, one in the Danube river in eastern Serbia in early April 1999, from which bodies were transferred to the police's Special Anti-Terrorist Unit Centre in Batajnica, second truck found in the Lake Perućac in western Serbia also in April 1999, from which bodies were burned nearby by Vlastimir Đorđević. He said in the trial he knew that he must investigate the findings of the two trucks, but didn't initiate investigation, that was illegal.

He was sentenced to 18 years in jail for the cover-up operation to hide the dead bodies, as well as for illegal persecution, deportation of Kosovo Albanians during the Kosovo war 1998–99.

=== Investigation by Belgrade ===
Until September 2021, nobody was accused in Serbian courts for the guilt of the concealment of the killed Kosovo Albanians.

== Documentaries ==
- "Depth Two" (Dubina Dva) is a documentary directed by Ognjen Glavonić about the mass grave in Batajnica with bodies of Kosovo Albanians, civilians, killed during Kosovo war, the mass grave was discovered in 2001.
- "The Unidentified" is a documentary shot by Balkan Investigative Reporting Network (BIRN). "The Unidentified" received the best short documentary award at the 2016 South East European Film Festival in Los Angeles. The film tells story of killing of Albanian civilians by Serbian fighters in Kosovo in 1999, whose remains were burned, some of them found at the Batajnica in 2001.

== Batajnica Memorial Initiative ==
There was created an online website, the Batajnica Memorial Initiative, to gather funds for creation of the Batajnica Memorial Site to commemorate the killed people. The virtual Batajnica Memorial Initiative is publishing photographs, documentary, data of killed people, whose bodies were found in Batajnica.

== See also ==
- Rudnica mass grave, a site in Rudnica, southern Serbia, where Kosovo Albanian remains found after the Kosovo War.
- Meja massacre, killing in April 1999 in the village of Meja. Many of the bodies of the killed in Meja were found in the Batajnica mass graves.
- List of massacres in Kosovo
