= Zllash =

Mountain in Kosovo

Coordinates: 42.68075°N 21.33481°E

Zllash (Serbian: Злаш, Zlaš) is a mountain in eastern Kosovo, 9 miles east of the capital city of Pristina.

The mountain stands at 1,210 m (3,970 ft) high and is part of the Gollak mountains. There is also a village with the same name.
