= Kosovo Specialist Chambers =

War crimes court in The Hague

- Dhomat e Specializuara të Kosovës (Albanian); Специјализована већа Косова (Serbian)
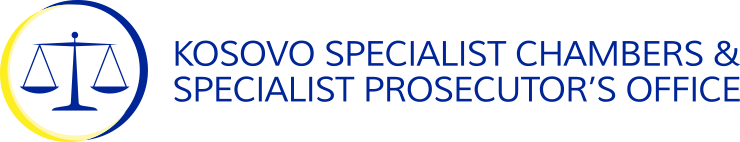
- Established: 2016; 10 years ago
- Location: The Hague, Netherlands
- Authorised by: Constitution of Kosovo
- Website: www.scp-ks.org

President
- Currently: Ekaterina Trendafilova
- Since: 12 January 2017

Prosecutor
- Currently: Kimberly West
- Since: 18 October 2023

The Kosovo Specialist Chambers (KSC; Albanian: Dhomat e Specializuara të Kosovës; Serbian: Специјализована већа Косова, Specijalizovana veća Kosova) is a court of Kosovo, located in The Hague (Netherlands), hosting four Specialist Chambers and the Specialist Prosecutor's Office, which may perform their activities either in the Netherlands or in Kosovo. The court is currently set up for delegating the trials of the crimes committed by members of the Kosovo Liberation Army (KLA), an ethnic-Albanian paramilitary organisation which sought the separation of Kosovo from Yugoslavia during the 1990s. The alleged crimes concern the period 1998–2000, during and at the end of the Kosovo War and directed afterwards against "ethnic minorities and political opponents". The court was formally established in 2016. It is separate from other Kosovar institutions, and independent. It is composed of a Specialist Prosecutor's Office and four Specialist Chambers, with themselves comprising Judges' Chambers and a Registry.

In December 2016 Ekaterina Trendafilova was elected first president. Among the people charged with war crimes and crimes against humanity are Kosovo former president Hashim Thaçi and senior Kosovar politician Kadri Veseli. On 15 September 2021 the court's first trial opened, the case against Salih Mustafa.

== Background ==
In 2010, Swiss politician Dick Marty authored a Council of Europe-report in which he noted war crimes had been committed by the KLA. Partly based on that report, the prosecutor of the Special Investigative Taskforce (SITF) of the European Union Rule of Law Mission in Kosovo (EULEX Kosovo) concluded sufficient evidence existed for prosecution of "war crimes, crimes against humanity as well as certain crimes against Kosovan law". The court is located outside Kosovo on request of the prosecutor in order to provide adequate protection to witnesses.

The Kosovo authorities have agreed with the EU on modalities of dealing with those serious allegations. On 3 August 2015, the Kosovo Assembly adopted Article 162 of the Kosovo Constitution and the Law on Specialist Chambers and Specialist Prosecutor's Office, following the Exchange of Letters between the President of Kosovo and the High Representative of the European Union for Foreign Affairs and Security Policy in 2014. The Specialist Chambers are attached to each level of the court system in Kosovo – Basic Court, Court of Appeals, Supreme Court and Constitutional Court. They will function according to relevant Kosovo laws as well as customary international law and international human rights law.

The EU has supported the process from the outset and together with other contributing countries (Canada, Norway, Switzerland, Turkey, and the United States of America) will financially support the work of the court.

The Specialist Chambers comprises two organs, the Chambers and the Registry. The Specialist Prosecutor's Office is an independent office for the investigation and prosecution of the crimes within the jurisdiction of the Specialist Chambers. The Specialist Chambers and the Specialist Prosecutor's Office are staffed with international judges, prosecutors and officers and have a seat in The Hague, the Netherlands.

== Legal basis and organisation ==
Unlike many other non-Dutch judicial institutions in The Hague, the Kosovo Relocated Specialist Judicial Institution isn't an international court, but a court constituted through Kosovan legislation. To provide a proper legal basis for the court, Kosovo's constitution was amended (amendment 24) and Law No.05/L-053 on specialist chambers and specialist prosecutor's office was approved.

The court will be staffed by EU personnel and will have international judges only. The costs of the court will be borne by the EU as part of its Common Foreign and Security Policy. The four specialized chambers are all chambers of corresponding regular Kosovar institutions:

- The court of first instance of Pristina
- The court of Appeal
- Supreme Court
- Constitutional Court

== Judges ==
Name	State	Term began	Term ended	Ref(s).
Kai Ambos	Germany	7 February 2017	In office	
Antonio Balsamo	Italy	7 February 2017	In office	
Christoph Barthe	Germany	7 February 2017	In office	
Gilbert Bitti	France	22 September 2020	In office	
Michael Bohlander	Germany	7 February 2017	31 August 2022	
Roland Dekkers	Netherlands	7 February 2017	In office	
Daniel Fransen	Belgium	22 September 2020	In office	
Emilio Gatti	Italy	7 February 2017	In office	
Fergal M. Gaynor	Ireland	22 September 2020	In office	
Christopher Gosnell	Canada	11 September 2025	In office	
Nicolas Guillou	France	7 February 2017	6 June 2024	
Piotr Hofmański	Poland	3 December 2024	In office	
Romina Incutti	Italy	22 September 2020	In office	
Nina H.B. Jørgensen	Norway	22 September 2020	In office	
Thomas Laker	Germany	7 February 2017	In office	
Marjorie Masselot	France	6 June 2024	In office	
Guénaël Mettraux	Switzerland	7 February 2017	In office	
Vladimir Mikula	Czech Republic	7 February 2017	In office	
Roumen H. Nenkov	Bulgaria	22 September 2020	In office	
Andres Parmas	Estonia	7 February 2017	6 March 2020	
Michèle Picard	France	7 February 2017	In office	
Ann Power-Forde	Ireland	7 February 2017	4 November 2019	
Keith Raynor	United Kingdom	7 February 2017	19 March 2020	
Kenneth Roberts	Canada	7 February 2017	2 May 2025	
Charles Smith III	United States	7 February 2017	In office	
Vidar Stensland	Norway	7 February 2017	In office	
Ekaterina Trendafilova	Bulgaria	12 January 2017	In office	
Christine van den Wyngaert	Belgium	7 February 2017	In office	
Mappie Veldt-Foglia	Netherlands	7 February 2017	In office	

== Specialist Prosecutor ==
Name	State(s)	Term began	Term ended	Ref(s).
David Schwendiman	United States	1 September 2016	31 March 2018	
Kwai Hong Ip (acting)	United Kingdom	1 April 2018	6 May 2018	
Jack Smith	United States	7 May 2018	18 November 2022	
Alex Whiting (acting)	France / United States	19 November 2022	17 October 2023	
Kimberly West	United States	18 October 2023	In office	

== Indicted persons ==
A total of 15 persons have been indicted in the Kosovo Specialist Chambers. Of those indicted, 14 have been arrested and transferred to the Chambers' custody and one has been summoned to appear. Four people are on trial, four people are appealing their sentences, three people are serving sentences, and four people have completed their sentences.

Name	Indicted	H	W	D	Detained	Current status	Ind.
Salih Mustafa	12 June 2020	—	4	—	24 September 2020	Serving sentence of 15 years' imprisonment	
Pjetёr Shala	12 June 2020	—	4	—	15 April 2021	Serving sentence of 13 years' imprisonment	
Jakup Krasniqi	26 October 2020	6	4	—	4 November 2020	Appeal of sentence of 25 years' imprisonment	
Rexhep Selimi	26 October 2020	6	4	—	5 November 2020	Appeal of sentence of 13 years' imprisonment	
Hashim Thaçi (Note: Hashim Thaçi was indicted in another case on 29 November 2024. In that case, trial began on 27 February 2026.)	26 October 2020	6	4	11	5 November 2020	Appeal of sentence of 25 years' imprisonment	
Kadri Veseli	26 October 2020	6	4	—	5 November 2020	Appeal of sentence of 18 years' imprisonment	
Hysni Gucati (Note: Hysni Gucati served 3 years and 23 days of his sentence of 4 years and 3 months' imprisonment in detention and the remainder on parole in addition to paying a €100 fine.)	11 December 2020	—	—	6	25 September 2020	Completed commuted sentence on 24 December 2024 (released on 18 October 2023)	
Nasim Haradinaj (Note: Nasim Haradinaj served 3 years, 2 months, and 19 days of his sentence of 4 years and 3 months' imprisonment in detention and the remainder on parole in addition to paying a €100 fine.)	11 December 2020	—	—	6	25 September 2020	Completed commuted sentence on 24 December 2024 (released on 14 December 2023)	
Ismet Bahtijari (Note: Ismet Bahtijari served 1 year, 4 months, and 15 days of his sentence of 2 years' imprisonment in detention.)	2 October 2023	—	—	3	6 October 2023	Completed commuted sentence on 4 October 2025 (released on 21 February 2025)	
Sabit Januzi (Note: Sabit Januzi served 1 year, 4 months, and 15 days of his sentence of 2 years' imprisonment in detention.)	2 October 2023	—	—	3	6 October 2023	Completed commuted sentence on 4 October 2025 (released on 21 February 2025)	
Haxhi Shala (Note: Haxhi Shala served 2 years, 1 month, and 21 days of his sentence of 3 years' imprisonment in detention.)	4 December 2023	—	—	3	12 December 2023	Paroled on 2 February 2026	
Fadil Fazliu	29 November 2024	—	—	2	5 December 2024	Trial began on 27 February 2026 (conditionally released on 10 February 2026)	
Isni Kilaj (Note: Isni Kilaj was originally detained from 2 November 2023 to 15 May 2024 before being conditionally released.)	29 November 2024	—	—	2	5 December 2024	Trial began on 27 February 2026 (conditionally released on 10 December 2025)	
Hajredin Kuçi	29 November 2024	—	—	2	Summoned	Trial began on 27 February 2026	
Bashkim Smakaj	29 November 2024	—	—	2	5 December 2024	Trial began on 27 February 2026 (conditionally released on 10 February 2026)	
