= Battle of Lapušnik =

1998 Kosovo War battle

- Part of the Kosovo War
Date	First Battle: 7–10 May 1998; Second Battle: 25–26 July 1998
Location	Lapušnik, Drenica, Kosovo, Yugoslavia
Result	First battle: KLA victory: Lapušnik prison camp is built; Priština-Peć motorway is obstructed; KLA forces capture Lapušnik gorge, forming a corridor between Drenica and the Mališevo region; Second battle: Yugoslav victory: Yugoslav forces take the Lapušnik prison camp; KLA forces withdraws into the Beriša mountains; 10 civilians executed by the KLA
Territorial changes	KLA captured Lapušnik and the surrounding area on May 9 but the village was recaptured by Yugoslav forces on 27th July

Belligerents
Kosovo Liberation Army	(Federal Republic of Yugoslavia) FR Yugoslavia

Commanders and leaders
Ismet Jashari; Fatmir Limaj; Isak Musliu; Ymer Alushani †; Kadri Veseli; Fehmi Lladrovci	(Federal Republic of Yugoslavia) Goran Radosavljević; (Federal Republic of Yugoslavia) Sreten Lukić

Units involved
121st “Ismet Jashari” brigade	(Federal Republic of Yugoslavia) Yugoslav Army (Federal Republic of Yugoslavia) Yugoslav police

Strength
100 militants	(Federal Republic of Yugoslavia) 400 personnel (Federal Republic of Yugoslavia) 140 tanks

Casualties and losses
47 killed	(Federal Republic of Yugoslavia) unknown (Federal Republic of Yugoslavia) 1 TAM-110 destroyed (Federal Republic of Yugoslavia) 1 Pinzgauer destroyed (Federal Republic of Yugoslavia) 1 tank damaged
- (Federal Republic of Yugoslavia) / (Albania) 23 civilians executed by the Kosovo Liberation Army in the camp

The Battle of Lapušnik (Serbian: Битка код Лапушника, Albanian: Beteja e Grykës së Llapushnikut) took place on 7–10 May and 25–26 July, 1998 in and around the village of Lapušnik, in the district of Priština, in Kosovo during the Kosovo War.

On 7 May 1998, Ismet Jashari, who had not fully recovered from the injuries he suffered during a previous ambush, led his brigade into Lapušnik, where he defeated the Ministry of Internal Affairs (MUP) and captured the village. Alongside him were Kadri Veseli,Fatmir Limaj, Isak Musliu, and Ymer Alushani.

The MUP launched a counterattack on Lapušnik on 9 May. The police entered the village and began attacking KLA positions. KLA called in reinforcements from Likovac and Klečka and pushed out the police.

The Priština—Peć motorway was obstructed for months, Lapušnik and the surrounding area was under rebel control. A corridor was formed from the Drenica region to the Mališevo region, enabling KLA fighters to move freely in a large part of the territory of Kosovo, which led them to organize and supply themselves with weapons.

== Battle ==
=== First battle ===
On 7 May 1998, clashes erupted between the Kosovo Liberation Army and the Yugoslav police. During the morning of 9 May, Yugoslav forces entered the Lapušnik gorge. An exchange of fire between the Yugoslav forces with the KLA fighters alongside armed residents of Lapušnik broke out. During the exchange, Ymer Alushani from the nearby village of Komoran sent militants to other villages near Lapušnik to bring men who had joined or were willing to join the KLA. Together with the KLA unit from Komoran, they subsequently went to Lapušnik. At the Peć-Priština motorway, KLA militants took positions and engaged the police. Meanwhile, KLA units in Klečka were informed of the attack. Fatmir Limaj, leading a 15-man group, arrived as reinforcements in Lapušnik. In the early afternoon, a Pinzgauer vehicle located in the middle of the village was hit by the KLA and exploded, leading to the withdrawal of the police. Later in the afternoon and through the evening, more KLA militants arrived at the village, where they dug trenches and made fortifications. By 10 May, Lapušnik was under KLA control. Following the capture, the KLA subsequently built the Lapušnik prison camp.

=== Second battle ===
On 25 and 26 July 1998, the Yugoslav police and army launched a counter-offensive against most of the KLA's major checkpoints and strongholds, including an attack against the KLA base in Lapušnik and the surrounding villages. Fighting broke out, which led to the retreat of the Kosovo Liberation Army into the Berisha mountains. Yugoslav forces seized back control of Lapušnik on July 27.

== Aftermath ==
Kadri Veseli, a Kosovo Politician and former founder and leader of the Kosovo Liberation Army, recalled it as one of the most fierce battles, saying that the fighting in Lapušnik resonated throughout Europe and the Albanian diaspora, which increased the ethnic Albanian population's confidence in the strength of the Kosovo Liberation Army with a massive mobilization.

From mid-June to the end of July, KLA forces established a prison camp in Lapušnik where both Serb and Albanian civilian detainees were subjected to mistreatment, torture and murder. When Yugoslav forces retook Lapušnik and the surrounding areas, the KLA abandoned the camp and marched the prisoners towards the mountains, dividing them into groups. A group of nine was released while another group numbering some 12 people were shot, ten of whom were killed.
