= Ismet Jashari =

Kosovar military commander (1967–1998)

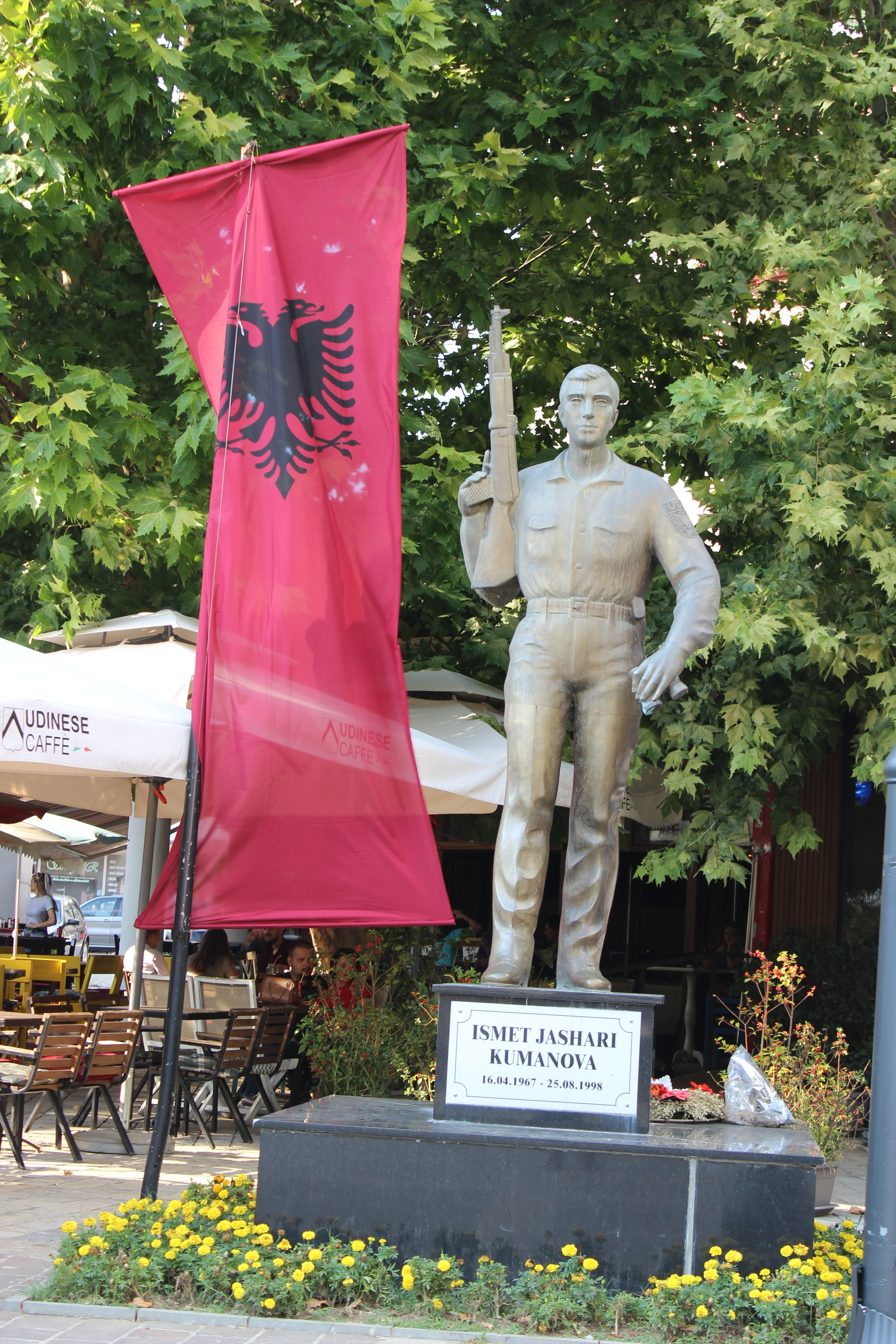
- Monument of Ismet Jashari in the city of Prizren
- Born: Ismet Jashari; 16 April 1967; Orizari, SR Macedonia, SFR Yugoslavia (today North Macedonia)
- Died: 25 August 1998 (aged 31); Duhël, Serbia, FR Yugoslavia (now Republic of Kosovo)
- Military career
- Allegiance: Kosova
- Branch: Kosovo Liberation Army
- Service years: 1997–1998
- Rank: Soldier; Commander
- Conflicts: Kosovo War; KLA spring offensives (1998); Yugoslav offensive in Kosovo (1998); KLA Summer offensive (1998); Operations in Klina and Dukagjin; Battle of Llapushnik; Battle of Carraleva; Battle of Duhla Pass; Offensive in June; Bllace Attack; VJ Summer Offensive; Offensive in August
- Awards: Hero of Kosovo (posthumously)

Ismet Jashari (16 April 1967 – 25 August 1998) also known as Commander Kumanova (Albanian: Komandant Kumanova), was an Albanian commander of the Kosovo Liberation Army (KLA) who was killed on 25 August 1998 during the fighting with Serbian forces in Kleçkë, Kosovo. The Ismet Jashari-Kumanova Brigade of the KLA was named in his memory. After the Kosovo War, he was declared Hero of Kosovo.

Jashari had left Switzerland where he lived to join the Kosovo Liberation Army (KLA) to fight against Serbian military and police forces under the command of former Serbian President Slobodan Milosevic.

== Early life ==
Ismet was born on April 16, 1967, in the village of Orizari in the Karadak Highlands of the Municipality of Lipkovo. His father was Jashar and his mother Nuria.

During the 1980s, the Jeshari family was engaged in pro-Albanian demonstration activism against the Yugoslav regime, which led Ismet to flee to Switzerland. He kept close contact with his brothers Murat and Xhemajli who were involved in resistance activities. In addition to his two brothers, Ismet also has five sisters. Xhemajli is an MP in the Macedonian Parliament today, representing the Albanian political party BDI (Bashkimi Demokratik për Integrim). Murat Jashari was arrested for illegal weapon trade during the Kosovo War by Swiss authorities.

He completed primary school in his hometown and continued his secondary education in Kumanovo.

== Kosovo War ==
Ismet Jashari joined the KLA after the Prekaz massacre on 7 March 1998. On March 11, he, together with other KLA leaders such as Fehmi Lladrovci, Bekim Berisha and Fatmir Limaj entered the Drenica valley, where the KLA was operating against the VJ. Later that month, the General Staff of the KLA, assigned Ismet Jashari as commander in the Llapusha region, beginning the Llapusha Front.

In Late March 1998, Ismet Jashari, together with Fatmir Limaj, formed the "Çeliku" unit, which was based in Kleçka.

In April 1998, Ismet Jashari was ambushed by Yugoslav forces between the villages of Volljakë and Çupevë, while he was returning to Kleçka from leading military operations in Klina and Dukagjin. Ismet Jashari survived the ambush, but was wounded in both legs.

On May 9, 1998, Ismet Jashari, who still had not fully recovered from the injuries he suffered during the ambush, led his forces into Llapushnik, where he defeated the Yugoslav Army and police and captured the town.

After occupying Llapushnik, Ismet Jashari led further operations against Yugoslav forces, defeating them in multiple battles and capturing the strategically important sites of Duhla Pass and Carraleva Gorge.

From beginning of May to August 1998, Ismet Jashari reinforced strategic sites in southern Drenica, Llapushnik and the Duhla Pass for an upcoming Yugoslav Offensive.

On 14 June 1998, Yugoslav forces attacked and captured the Carraleva Gorge and the Duhla Pass, held by Ismet Jashari's forces, three days later Ismet Jashari counterattacked the VJ, who were preparing to penetrate towards Luzhnica. Ismet Jashari managed to recapture the Carraleva Gorge, forcing the VJ to withdraw back to their positions in the Duhla Pass. At the end of June 1998, Ismet Jashari fortied his positions in Carraleva, Zborca, Blinaja, Fushtica, Terpeza, Bllaca and everywhere in the territories, that were under the control of the KLA in south Drenica and Llapusha.

In August 1998, Ismet Jashari attacked and defeated VJ units at several occasions, such as in Shtëpia e Pylltarit, Ura e Sahitit and in the village of Belinc. During a major Yugoslav offensive on 25 and 26 July 1998, Ismet Jashari's forces fought battles with the VJ in Llapushnik, Zborc and the Carraleva Gorge, but were not able to hold these strategic sites.

On 23 August 1998, Yugoslav forces marched towards Kleçka, where the General Staff of the KLA was also located, but were met by Ismet Jashari's forces in Luzhnica, who held off the VJ from penetrating towards Kleçka for an entire day, while being heavily outnumbered. On 24 August 1998, the VJ had increased their offensive by attacking Ismet Jashari's forces with large-caliber cannons and surface-to-surface missiles, ultimately succeeding in driving the KLA out of Luzhnica and capturing Kleçka. One day later on 25 August, Ismet Jashari had launched a surprise counterattack in an attempt to retrieve the bodies of the fallen soldiers. After several hours of close combat in Luzhnica, Ismet Jashari fell in Battle.

== Death ==
On August 25, 1998, while fighting with Serbian Forces, Ismet Jashari was killed. On August 25, 2009, Jashari was posthumously awarded the Hero of Kosovo award.

== Legacy ==
In 2001, the 113th NLA Brigade was established under his name during the 2001 Insurgency in Macedonia. In 2011 a monument dedicated to him was inaugurated in Lipkovo Municipality, Republic of Macedonia.
