= Kosovo War crimes witness intimidation and deaths =

War crimes witnesses to the Kosovo War (1998–99) have been victims to threats, violence, and murder. Those who spoke out about the abuses of their side in the conflict were seen as traitors to their community, and therefore, only a few became witnesses in war crime trials. The international institutions ICTY, UNMIK and EULEX, and national courts in Serbia and Kosovo, have all had problems in ensuring safety for testifying protected witnesses. According to observers, one of the main reasons that the Kosovo Relocated Specialist Judicial Institution will partly operate outside Kosovo is the past failures of the international institutions to protect witnesses.

According to Carla Del Ponte, the former ICTY prosecutor, "the investigation of the Kosovo Liberation Army fighters appeared to be the most frustrating of all the investigations done by the ICTY," and stated "witnesses were so afraid and intimidated that they even feared to talk about the KLA presence in some areas, not to mention actual crimes". She further stated that "I am convinced that UNMIK and even KFOR officers were afraid for their lives and the lives of their missions’ members. I think some of the ICTY judges were afraid that they would become a target for the Albanians" and believes that witness intimidation seriously affected the acquitting verdicts against KLA officials Fatmir Limaj and Ramush Haradinaj. Numerous witnesses did change their testimonies during trials, while others were killed or mysteriously disappeared. Avni Zogiani, leader of an anti-corruption nongovernmental organization in Kosovo, said "Intimidation and even killings of witnesses are nothing new or shocking in Kosovo".

EULEX prosecutor Charles Hardaway said that "Witness intimidation, not only in war crimes but in other cases too, is happening from people with high competencies in government who are powerful". According to Belgian author Jelle Janssens, it was reported that judges and prosecutors became terrified at the mention of high-ranking KLA officers or politicians in case files. Del Ponte asserts that there were serious abuses of witnesses in Kosovo local criminal proceedings, and also alleged that UNMIK leaked sensitive information about witnesses to defendants, which UNMIK denied but later admitted that it had stopped some investigations into high-level perpetrators due to political reasons. The Humanitarian Law Center concluded that a large number of acquittals were due to witnesses changing their stories, suspecting intimidation.

A bomb was placed under the car of a witness in 2002, and in 2003, witness Tahir Zemaj was murdered in Peć after testifying against a senior KLA official, while Sadik Musaj and Ilir Selamaj, witnesses at the same trial, were also killed. Kujtin Berisha was run over in Montenegro, Bekim Mustafa and Auni Elezaj were shot dead. Kosovo policemen Sabaheta Tava and Isuk Hakljaja were found dead in a burnt car. Agim Zogaj, a former KLA commander turned witness, was found dead in 2011. He was a key witness in the case against Fatmir Limaj. A potential witness to the Klečka killings feared for his safety and decided not to testify, following news of Zogaj's death. In 2016, former KLA local commander Bedri Curri was shot dead, and in 2017 his daughter was killed in a car crash, the two deaths linked in Kosovo media to Curri's planning to testify against KLA crimes.

The ICTY Trial Chamber acknowledged during the Trial Judgement of Haradinaj et al. that:

[…] throughout the trial, the Trial Chamber encountered significant difficulties in securing the testimony of a large number of witnesses. Many witnesses cited fear as a prominent reason for not wishing to appear before the Trial Chamber to give evidence. The Trial Chamber gained a strong impression that the trial was being held in an atmosphere where witnesses felt unsafe.

== See also ==
- Witness tampering
