= Yugoslav counter-offensive in Kosovo (1998) =

Yugoslavian military action in 1998

Yugoslav offensive in Kosovo
- Part of the Kosovo War
- Map of Kosovo
Date	19 July – 4 October 1998
Location	AP Kosovo, FR Yugoslavia
Result	Yugoslav victory Full results: United Nations Security Council Resolution 1199; Ceasefire established in mid-October; Start of the Kosovo Verification Mission and Operation Eagle Eye; The KLA is suppressed by the Yugoslav Army; Most of the KLA is expelled from Kosovo; Yugoslav forces regain control over several dozens of villages, Drenica, and many key KLA strongholds; Establishment of Yugoslav control over whole Kosovo
Territorial changes	Yugoslavia recaptured most of Kosovo, including numerous KLA strongholds in Metohija and Drenica

Belligerents
FR Yugoslavia	Kosovo Liberation Army; Supported by: United States

Commanders and leaders
Slobodan Milosević (Federal Republic of Yugoslavia) Vladimir Lazarević (Federal Republic of Yugoslavia) Nebojša Pavković (Federal Republic of Yugoslavia) Vlastimir Đorđević (Federal Republic of Yugoslavia) Franko Simatović (Federal Republic of Yugoslavia) Goran Radosavljević (Federal Republic of Yugoslavia) Milorad Ulemek (Federal Republic of Yugoslavia) Sreten Lukić (Federal Republic of Yugoslavia) Goran Ostojić †	Fatmir Limaj; Gani Krasniqi; Hisni Kiljaj; Ramush Haradinaj; Agim Ramadani; Ekrem Rexha; Naim Maloku; Fehmi Lladrovci †; Samidin Xhezairi-Hoxha (WIA); Bekim Berisha †; Agim Shala †; Ismet Jashari †; Selajdin Berisha †; Bedri Shala †; Elton Zherka †; Përmet Vula †; Habib Zogaj †; Nuhi Mazreku †; Alija Rabić †; Abu Ismaili

Units involved
Yugoslav Army; Priština Corps; 549th Prizren Motorized Brigade; Yugoslav Air Force and Air Defense; Ministry of Internal Affairs; Special Anti-Terrorist Unit; Special Police Units; Special Operations Unit; Russian volunteers Ukrainian volunteers Serbian volunteers	111th Brigade; 112th Brigade; 113th Brigade; 114th Brigade; 121st Brigade; 122nd Brigade; 123rd Brigade; 124th Brigade; 125th Brigade; 131st Brigade; 134th Brigade; 138th Brigade; 125th Brigade; Black Eagles; Mujahideen contingents

Strength
25,000–40,000 volunteers 15,000 MUP members 12,000–50,000 soldiers	25,000 militants 50–210 Mujahideen members

Casualties and losses
27 killed	367–500 killed
- At least 2,000 mostly Albanians killed 100,000–300,000 Kosovo Albanians displaced 20,000 Serbs displaced

The Yugoslav Army and Serbian Police launched a major counter-offensive against the Kosovo Liberation Army in mid July, 1998. The offensive was backed by artillery, tanks and air support. The offensive had the goal of driving the KLA away from the positions it gained during the summer offensive. The Yugoslav offensive began with an attack on Orahovac and the recapture of the town by Yugoslav forces, which continued until 4 October. Ten days later, on October 14, the American diplomat Richard Holbrooke and Yugoslav president Slobodan Milošević signed a ceasefire agreement which resulted in the temporary withdrawal of Yugoslav forces from Kosovo.

== Prelude ==
In 1996, the Kosovo Liberation Army began attacking the Yugoslav Army and the Serbian Police in Kosovo. Their goal was to either separate the province from the rest of Yugoslavia or to make it part of Albania. In the beginning, the KLA started with hit-and-run attacks. The group quickly gained popularity among young Kosovo Albanians, many of whom favoured a more aggressive approach and rejected the non-violent resistance of Kosovo president Ibrahim Rugova. The organization received a significant boost in 1997, when a civil war in neighbouring Albania led to thousands of weapons being looted from depots of the Albanian Armed Forces. Many of these weapons ended up in the hands of the KLA. The KLA also received substantial funds from its involvement in drug trades. After the VJ and MUP attacked the compound of KLA leader Adem Jashari in March 1998, the popularity of KLA skyrocketed. The attack motivated thousands of Kosovo Albanians to join the KLA, starting the Albanian uprising that eventually erupted in the spring of 1998. In the summer of 1998 the KLA launched a large scale offensive against Yugoslav forces with the goal of capturing territories in Kosovo and expanding their control. The KLA managed to capture somewhere around 40% of Kosovo which triggered a Yugoslav offensive in mid July. By the late summer 1998, the United States had increasingly distanced itself from Yugoslav president Slobodan Milošević and signaled political support for the KLA amid growing international concern over the humanitarian situation in Kosovo.

== July–August ==
The Kosovo Liberation Army mounted a full scale assault on the town of Orahovac and the surrounding villages on 17 July, which resulted in the KLA capturing the town. Around the same time, 1,000 KLA soldiers attempted to cross the border, but were ambushed. The fighting ended with 22 casualties on the KLA side, 18 of them being mujahideen, and only 200 militants were able to cross the border, with several others retreating to Albania. After 3 days of intense fighting, Orahovac was retaken by the Yugoslav forces. Around 25 KLA militants were killed during the battle per KLA sources.

On 25 July, Yugoslav forces launched an offensive to retake the village of Lapušnik, and to open up the Priština-Peć motorway. By 27 July, Lapušnik was under Yugoslav control, opening up the Priština-Peć motorway. Around the same time, seven or eight KLA militants were killed while attempting to leave Junik and cross the border. Later on, Yugoslav authorities launched a six-day military offensive on July 28. The offensive had the goal of capturing key portions of Kosovo from the KLA. On 28 July, Yugoslav forces surrounded the town of Junik, trapping 1,000 to 1,500 militants within the town. Goran Ostojić, the chief of staff of the 63rd Parachute Brigade was killed in the operation. 28-29 July, Yugoslav forces under the command of Slobodan Milošević launched an offensive with the goal of retaking the town of Mališevo, which was an important KLA stronghold at the time. The KLA suffered 110 casualties and 10,000 Kosovo Albanians fled the town.

On 10 August, Yugoslav forces began an operation to retake the village of Lođa in western Kosovo, near Peć. On 16 August, the last KLA stronghold, the town of Junik was captured by Yugoslav forces, forcing the remaining KLA soldiers to withdraw towards surrounding hills and forests. The next day, 17 August, the village of Lođa was captured by Yugoslav forces, bulldozing all of the 284 houses and the mosque. Yugoslav policemen and soldiers were killed while the KLA suffered 13 losses including several commanders like Bekim Berisha. 12,000 Albanian civilians were displaced and 28 were killed.

== September–October ==
On 1 September, Yugoslav forces launched an offensive against the KLA strongholds south of Prizren, in an area north of Opolje. After several days of fighting, they managed to capture Hoča Zagradska, Lez, Ješkovo, Kuštendil, Ljubičevo, and other KLA strongholds in Prizren. The offensive resulted in a total of 35 casualties on the KLA side. After the offensive in Prizren, Yugoslav forces disarmed Albanian villagers. On 9 September, Yugoslav forces mounted an offensive and captured Prilep, Rznić, Dašinovac, Glođane and Lake Radonjić. On 22 September, Yugoslav forces launched offensive in Central Drenica that lasted until 26 September. Yugoslav forces managed to capture Gladno Selo, Gornje and Donje Obrinje, along with other villages.

== Aftermath ==
The Yugoslav offensive was considered a success. It resulted in the recapture of most of the territory in Kosovo, which was previously held by the KLA, including Drenica, and other important KLA strongholds in Mališevo, Junik, Prizren, Orahovac, Suva Reka, etc. The KLA was forced to withdraw from one-third of Kosovo's territory. According to a Human Rights Watch report, over 200 Kosovar villages were destroyed in the conflict. Due to the ceasefire in October, the Yugoslav forces withdrew from most of the areas they recaptured from the KLA allowing the KLA to re-establish control in the Albanian-populated areas that didn't have any Yugoslav military presence. Although yugoslav forces and police managed to regain control over Kosovo and largely defeat the KLA by May 1999.

The KLA suffered hundreds of deaths during the offensive, according to Serbian historian Aleksandar Logos. An official list published by the Humanitarian Law Center recorded the deaths of 367 KLA militants, and 8 others were declared missing between 22 July and 4 October. The German historian Jens Reuter wrote that the KLA had "lost more than 500 soldiers and key strategic positions as well" during the offensive. The offensive caused the near destruction of the KLA. Logos did not estimate the Yugoslav casualties. Another report from the Humanitarian Law Center recorded the deaths of 24 Yugoslav soldiers and policemen during 22 July and 4 October. In an interview for the New York Times, Naim Maloku, a senior KLA officer and former Yugoslav Army officer, said that the Yugoslav forces encountered strong resistance from the KLA in the Likovac–Gornje Obrinje area. He stated that "we took weapons from 47 Serbs".

As of September 1998, there were 2,000 recorded deaths during the conflict, including civilians. The estimates for displaced Kosovo Albanians varied widely, ranging from 100,000 to 150,000, 200,000 and even up to 300,000.

== See also ==
- Battle of Junik
- Mališevo offensive
- Yugoslav September offensive

== Bibliography ==
- Gow, James (2003). The Serbian Project and its Adversaries: A Strategy of War Crimes. Montreal • Kingston • Ithaca: McGill-Queen's University Press. ISBN 0-7735-2385-5.
- Judah, Tim (2002). Kosovo: War and Revenge. New Haven, Connecticut: Yale University Press. ISBN 978-0-300-09725-2.
- Pavković, Aleksandar (2000). The Fragmentation of Yugoslavia. London, UK: Springer. ISBN 978-0-230-28584-2.
- Randáček, Vladimír (2008). The OSCE Kosovo Verification Mission, 1998–1999 (PDF) (Bc. thesis). Prague, Czechia: Charles University. [ISBN unspecified]
- OSCE; ODIHR (5 November 1999). "The OSCE–KVM Human Rights operation". Kosovo/Kosova: As Seen, As Told. Warsaw, Poland: OSCE & ODIHR. [ISBN unspecified]
- Reuter, Jens (1999). "Kosovo 1998". In IFSH (ed.). OSCE Yearbook 1998 (PDF). Institut für Friedensforschung und Sicherheitspolitik. pp. 183–194. ISBN 978-3-7890-6071-7.
- Henriksen, Dag (2013). NATO's Gamble: Combining Diplomacy and Airpower in the Kosovo Crisis, 1998-1999. Naval Institute Press. ISBN 978-1-61251-555-7.
