= Klecka case =

Mass killing

Klečka case
- Location: Klečka, near Lipjan, Kosovo, FR Yugoslavia
- Date: 17–22 July 1998; April 1999
- Target: Ethnic Serb and Albanian prisoners, Serbian military and police personnel
- Attack type: Executions, torture
- Deaths: July 1998; No confirmed murders (according to ICTY investigations); April 1999; 8-10 Serbs and Albanians (according to EULEX and the Humanitarian Law Center of Serbia)
- Accused: Luan and Bekim Mazreku, Fatmir Limaj et al.
- Convicted: See Trials

Crimes were allegedly committed in July 1998 near the village of Klečka, in central Kosovo, during the Kosovo War. Serbian authorities made unsubstantiated claims that mass killings were perpetrated by members of the Kosovo Liberation Army (KLA) against Serb civilians.

Allegations of crimes committed by the KLA at a detention site in Klečka in April 1999 were also investigated by the District Court in Pristina, based on the diary of a former KLA guard. The court found that between 8 and 10 ethnic Serbs and Albanians were killed.

== Events ==
=== 1998 allegations ===
In August 1998, the Ministry of Internal Affairs (MUP) took control of the Klečka area from the Kosovo Liberation Army (KLA) and reported the discovery of a site they claimed was a detention and execution location operated by the insurgents.

The authorities alleged that 22 Serb civilians, including women, had been killed at the site, and that their bodies had been burned in a lime kiln. The Yugoslav Ministry of Foreign Affairs condemned the killings in Klecka as a "Nazi-style" crime, claiming to possess evidence that two ethnic Albanian suspects were responsible and had been apprehended, while calling on the international community to reconsider its support for the KLA.

The authorities claimed that the two Albanian cousins, Luan and Bekim Mazreku, were KLA members. Bekim was presented to foreign journalists while in police custody and questioned by Danica Marinković, an investigating judge from Priština associated with a number of trials involving the torture of ethnic Albanians. He was not permitted to speak independently to reporters.

A spokesperson for the KLA denied any involvement in the killings, stating that the Mazreku cousins were not members of the organization and alleging that "the KLA has not killed a single Serb civilian."

As of 1 September 1998, Human Rights Watch reported that it had been unable to confirm the allegations regarding Klečka. The organization noted that the manner in which the claims were presented raised serious questions about their validity and underscored the need for an investigation by an impartial forensic team. Senior Human Rights Watch researcher involved in investigations in Kosovo, Fred Abrahams, would later state during proceedings before the International Criminal Tribunal for the former Yugoslavia (ICTY) that efforts to verify the allegations had been unsuccessful, noting that "we were not able to confirm the allegations made by the Yugoslav government despite our best efforts," and that "nobody has actually sustained any information… of a mass execution site in Klečka committed by the KLA."

==== Forensic research ====
In October 1998, a Finnish forensic team, supported by the European Union, received permission from Yugoslav authorities and local Kosovo courts to exhume bodies from six sites in Kosovo. Those associated with the KLA are: Gornje Obrinje, Orahovac, Golubovac, Glođane, Klečka, and Volujak. The team carried out investigations at Klečka and Volujak, both sites connected to alleged KLA abuses. However, on 10 December 1998, Serbian forces prevented them from accessing Gornje Obrinje, where reports indicated that members of the ethnic Albanian Delijaj family in September, after severe fighting swept the region. A convoy of police blocked the team, ultimately forcing the Finnish forensic team to abandon its attempt to reach the site.

Human Rights Watch strongly condemned these actions, noting that Yugoslav forces had also interfered with the works conducted by ICTY investigators. ICTY investigators have repeatedly been denied visas and have been barred by Yugoslav authorities from carrying out investigations in Kosovo.

In Klečka, the Finnish experts examined human skeletal remains that had already been recovered by authorities and processed by local Yugoslav forensic teams, these remains had been brought to Pristina before the EU team's arrival. Their osteological analysis found partial and fragmentary remains, showing evidence of burning, and documented injuries and pathological changes where possible. DNA analysis was used to estimate a minimum number of individual victims from the available fragments. However, the determination of exact cause and manner of death was severely limited by the degraded condition of the bones, incomplete documentation of their recovery, the fragmented and burned nature of much of the material, and the absence of a clear chain of custody or full contextual information from the original burial sites. Accordingly, while the Finnish investigation documented the presence of human remains and conducted osteological, anthropological, and DNA analysis, the results were inconclusive regarding many of the alleged events at Klečka.

==== Further events ====
On 31 August 1998, more than 200 ethnic Serb women demonstrated in front of the United States Information Agency office in Pristina to protest reported executions of Serbian civilians by the KLA in Klecka. The demonstrators threw stones at the building while shouting slogans such as "Fascists!" and "Murderers!", as police reportedly observed from a distance. The crowd subsequently moved to the offices of the International Committee of the Red Cross (ICRC), where they again threw stones and assaulted an ethnic Albanian guard, accusing the organization of "bringing humanitarian aid to the terrorists." According to press reports, the demonstrators later boarded two buses that had been brought to the scene by Serbian police.

Yugoslav forces withdrew from Klecka due to a ceasefire agreement signed in October 1998.

=== 1999 allegations ===
In 2009, former KLA guard Agim Zogaj went to the police and told them that he had kept a secret diary of the activities of all the prisoners the KLA kept at the prison camp they had set up in Klecka in April 1999. Zogaj alleged that prisoners were subjected to inhumane treatment and that several of them had been executed on the orders of the camp commander Fatmir Limaj. Zogaj, who became known as "Witness X", committed suicide in November 2011 by hanging, shortly before the trial against Limaj was set to begin.

==== Testimony of Witness X ====
The testimony of Zogaj alleged the murder of two Serbian policemen, Nebojša Đurčić and Veljko Marković. After he provided this information to EULEX, the bodies of the two officers were discovered at the indicated site.

According to the testimony, Zogaj stated that he himself killed a Serb with a scythe. He provided two possible locations to EULEX, where the bodies were later found in a mass grave.

== Trials ==
=== 1998 allegations ===
==== Serbian trial ====
On 18 April 2001, following a one-year trial, Luan Mazreku and Bekim Mazreku were convicted by a Serbian court in Niš on charges of terrorism and sentenced to 20 years' imprisonment. The Humanitarian Law Center (HLC), which monitored the proceedings, criticized the trial as highly biased, citing restrictions on the right to defense, lack of independent legal representation, and testimony obtained under duress. The HLC stated that the evidence presented did not substantiate the charges.

According to the HLC report, the Mazreku were subjected to abuse by Serbian police and judicial authorities, including repeated beatings, drug-induced subjugation, genital mutilation, and other forms of coercion intended to force false confessions. The organization described the trial as a show trial designed to legitimize convictions rather than establish accountability.

The Mazreku were eventually released after the fall of Slobodan Milošević's regime and returned to Kosovo along with other prisoners, according to the UN Mission in Kosovo.

=== 1999 allegations ===
Evidence in the trial against Limaj, based on the diary and statements of Witness X, were dismissed in March 2012 by the District Court of Pristina, made up of a council of two EULEX and one local judge. One of the judges dissented from this opinion. In May 2012, Limaj and three others were formally acquitted, following the previous acquittal of five other defendants in March of that year. In November 2012, the Kosovo Supreme Court overruled the decision and ordered a re-trial. In May 2017, they were acquitted again. The trial panel in the District Court of Pristina did however find that approximately 8 to 10 individuals were unlawfully killed, including both Serbs and Kosovo Albanians whom the KLA considered as "collaborators".

== See also ==
- Kosovo War crimes witness intimidation and deaths

== Sources ==
- Dimitrijević, Vojin (2001). Human Rights in Yugoslavia, 2000: Legal Provisions, Practice and Legal Consciousness in the Federal Republic of Yugoslavia Compared to International Human Rights Standards. Centre for Human Rights. ISBN 978-86-7202-040-3.
- Stakić, Jasmina (27 April 2017). "Užasno svedočenje albanskih terorista o masakru Srba: Silovali smo vaše devojčice, vadili im oči i komadali ih". Telegraf.
- Human Rights Watch (Organization) (2001). Under Orders: War Crimes in Kosovo. Human Rights Watch. pp. 562–. ISBN 978-1-56432-264-7.
- "Evidence ruled inadmissible in KLA war crimes case". B92. 21 March 2012.
- Judah, Tim (2002). Kosovo: War and Revenge. Yale University Press. ISBN 0300097255.
- Krieger, Heike (2001). The Kosovo Conflict and International Law: An Analytical Documentation 1974-1999. Cambridge University Press. ISBN 9780521800716.
