= Staro Gracko massacre =

1999 killing of Kosovo Serbs

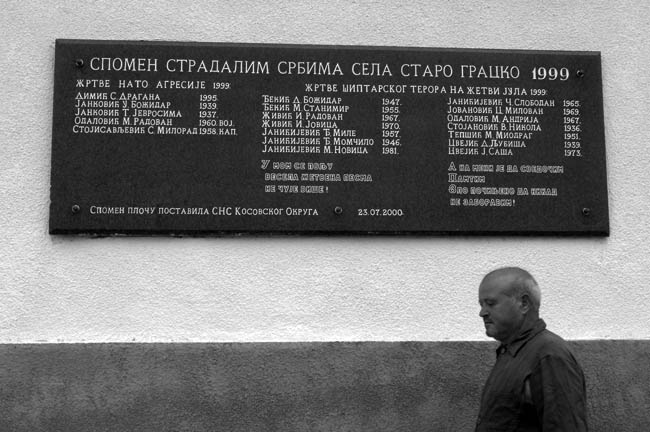
- Location: Staro Gracko, Lipjan municipality, UN-administered Kosovo
- Date: 23 July 1999; 9:13 pm (Central European Time)
- Target: Kosovo Serb farmers
- Attack type: Mass killing, mass shooting
- Deaths: 14
- Perpetrators: unknown; suspected Albanian militants

The Staro Gracko massacre (Serbian: Масакр у Старом Грацком, Albanian: Masakra në Grackën e Vjetër) was the mass killing of 14 Kosovo Serb farmers in the village of Staro Gracko in the Kosovo municipality of Lipjan on 23 July 1999. The killings occurred after Yugoslav troops withdrew from the region in the aftermath of the Kosovo War. The massacre is the worst single crime in Kosovo since the conflict ended in June 1999. As of 2019 the perpetrators of the killings have never been found and held accountable.

== Background ==
NATO launched an air campaign against the Federal Republic of Yugoslavia lasting from 24 March to 10 June 1999 when the Yugoslav authorities agreed to sign the Kumanovo Agreement. After 40,000 Yugoslav troops left Kosovo, NATO-led international peacekeepers established the Kosovo Force (KFOR) with 50,000 troops, while 170,000 Kosovo Serbs fled to Central Serbia.

Although the village of Staro Gracko, with a population of 300, was predominantly inhabited by ethnic Serbs and was home to eighty Serb and two Kosovo Albanian families, the surrounding villages were inhabited by ethnic Albanians.

== Massacre ==
On 23 July 1999, at approximately 9:13 pm, British KFOR troops heard gunfire and contacted a NATO reaction-force which hurried to the scene. The NATO soldiers subsequently discovered the bodies of thirteen Serbs next to a combine harvester by an open field. A fourteenth body was discovered lying on a tractor nearby. The farmers had been returning home after a day of harvesting wheat.

The British patrol had visited the site just five hours before the bodies were discovered and found nothing strange. When their corpses were discovered, it was reported that the men had been grouped together in a circle and shot dead. The bodies of some victims appeared to have been mutilated and disfigured with blunt instruments. The farmers had requested NATO protection seven days prior to the killings, but their pleas were ignored.

== Aftermath ==
After the fourteen bodies were discovered, Canadian troops cordoned off the village. The bodies were then taken to a hospital in Pristina to be identified. The United Nations stated that women and children were among the victims.

Four people were arrested two days later in relation to the killings, but were released. UNMIK police arrested an ethnic Albanian man in 2007 but released him two months later for lack of evidence. In 2010, UN prosecutors handed over the case file to EULEX, who closed the case in 2017.

=== Reaction ===
Kosovo Liberation Army leader Hashim Thaçi condemned the killings, calling them "[a] crazy act designed to wreck the improving relations between Kosovo Albanians and Serbs." Bernard Kouchner, the head of the United Nations Interim Administration Mission in Kosovo (UNMIK), said that he was "horrified" by the massacre and promised to bring "the perpetrators to justice without delay." Louise Arbour, the chief prosecutor of the International Criminal Tribunal for the former Yugoslavia (ICTY), said that she was "gravely concerned" and called for "an immediate investigation into the massacre."

Yugoslav President Slobodan Milošević blamed international peacekeeping forces for the massacre while VJ General Nebojša Pavković claimed the right to send Yugoslav troops back into Kosovo if the United Nations were not able to control the province.

== See also ==
- Gnjilane killings
- List of massacres in the Kosovo War
- War crimes in the Kosovo War
