= Black Eagles (Kosovo Liberation Army unit) =

- Shqiponjat e Zeza
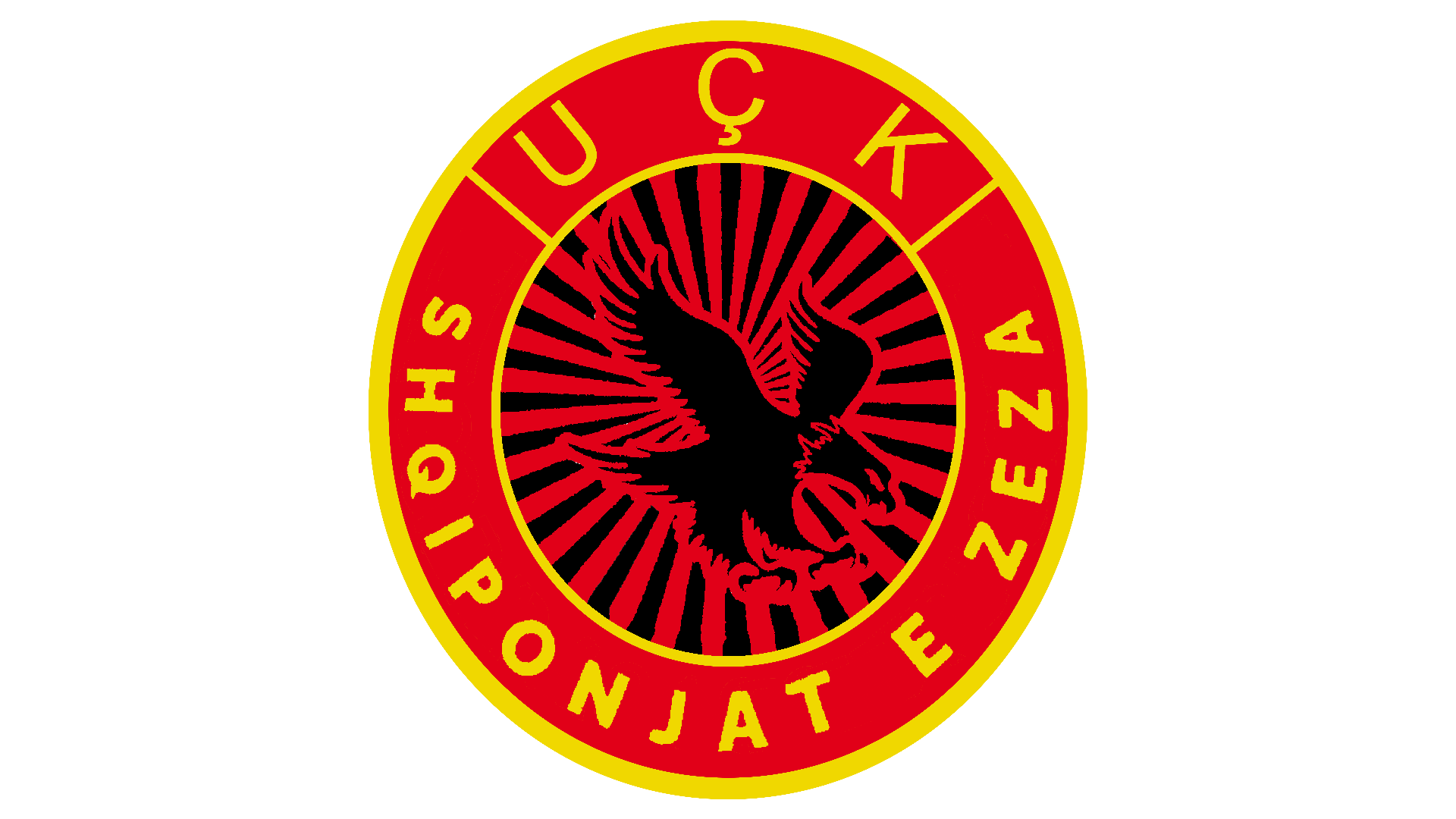
- Active: 14 May 1998
- Disbanded: September 1999 (incorporated as part of “Close Protection" unit of TMK)
- Allegiance: Kosovo Liberation Army
- Type: Special unit
- Role: Rapid Intervention Unit (later on as part of Brigade 131 "Jusuf Gërvalla")
- Size: 30 to 40 members (1998) up to 100 members (1999)
- Part of: Kosovo Liberation Army; Dukagjin Operational Zone; Black Eagles
- Anniversaries: 14 May
- Engagements: Kosovo War; Dečani operation; Battle of Glođane; Yugoslav counter-offensive in Kosovo (1998); Yugoslav September Offensive

Commanders
- Commander: Idriz Balaj

The Black Eagles (Albanian: Shqiponjat e Zeza) were a special unit of the Kosovo Liberation Army (KLA) that operated during the Kosovo War. The unit operated in the Metohija region of western Kosovo and was involved within the Dukagjin Operational Zone of the KLA.

It was commanded by Idriz Balaj “Togeri” and was based in the villages of Glođane and Irzniq. The unit was known for wearing distinctive black uniforms, as well as black civilian clothing.

== History ==
The unit participated in multiple KLA operations during the war and was documented in proceedings before the International Criminal Tribunal for the former Yugoslavia (ICTY), including the trial of KLA commanders in the Haradinaj case.

=== Early operations ===
The Black Eagles was established on 14 May 1998, numbering around 30 to 40 members. The commander, Idriz Balaj, had fought during the Croatian War of Independence. They were formed as a rapid intervention unit.

During the Dečani operation in late May through early June 1998, the Black Eagles operated in engagements against Yugoslav security forces in western Kosovo. During the fighting, Black Eagles member Altin Haskaj was killed. Later in June, Armend Kukleci, a Black Eagles member, was killed alongside Blerim Lokaj. July, the unit developed a secondary headquarters in the village of Irzniq.

=== Fighting in Glođane and the Radonjić massacre ===
The Federal Republic of Yugoslavia launched a counteroffensive in Kosovo targeting multiple KLA strongholds. The village of Glođane which served as the unit’s headquarters was attacked in mid-August as part of the Yugoslav counter-offensive. On 12 August, the village of Glođane was taken by the Yugoslav government forces.

The unit fought during the Yugoslav September Offensive, in which the government forces discovered an execution site of civilians near the Lake Radonjić, in which 34 to 39 civilians were killed. The Black Eagles assisted the forces under Ramush Haradinaj in killing civilians, including acts of rape and torture.
