= Abdullah Tahiri =

Kosovo Liberation Army soldier

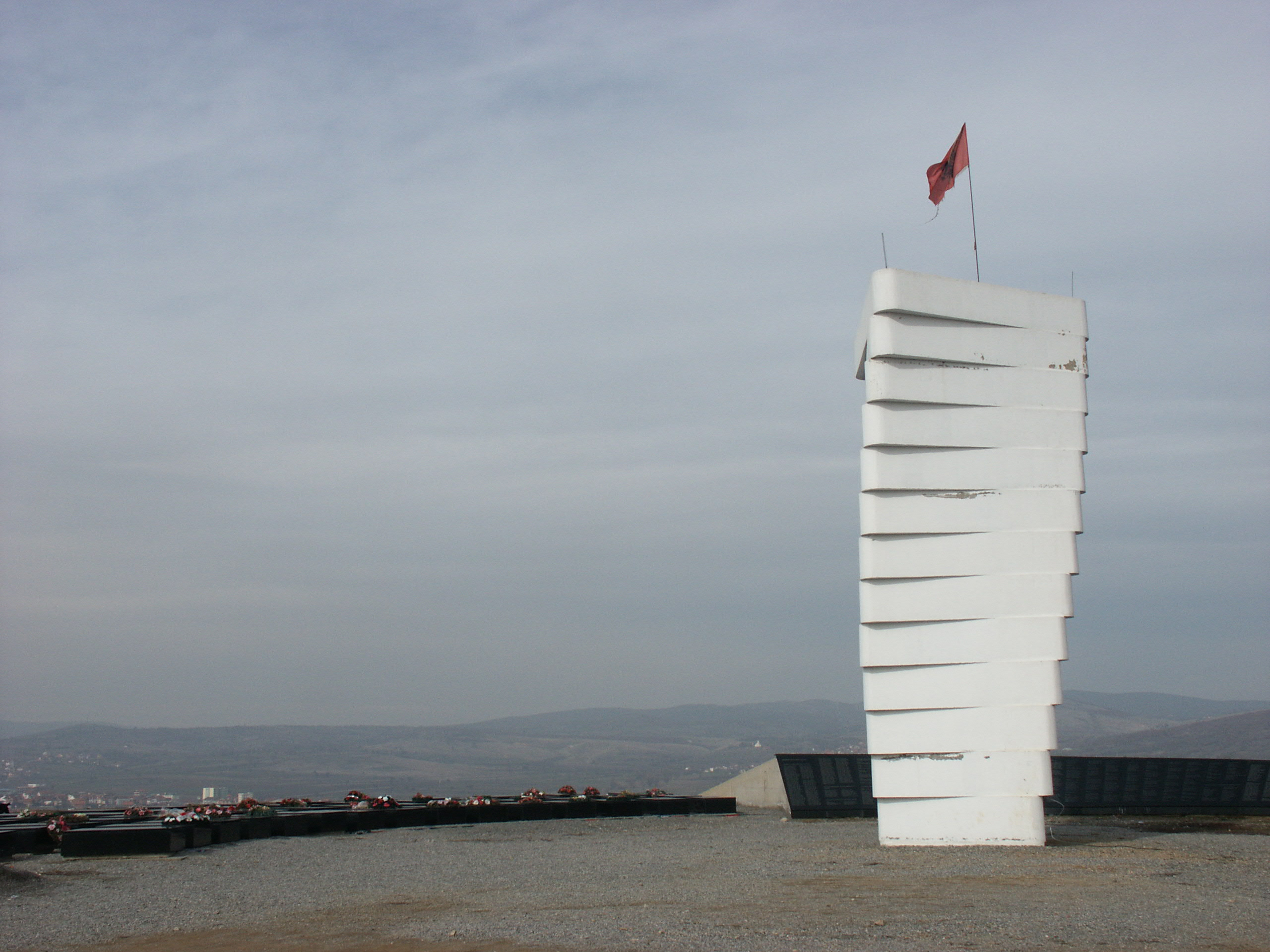
- Memorial of Martyrs in Gjilan
- Born: 2 September 1956; Malishevë, Gjilan, Kosovo, FPR Yugoslavia
- Died: 19 May 1999 (aged 42)
- Military career
- Allegiance: Kosova
- Branch: Kosovo Liberation Army
- Service years: 1998–1999
- Rank: Major General
- Conflicts: Kosovo War
- Awards: Hero of Kosovo (posthumously)

Abdullah Tahiri (September 2, 1956 – May 19, 1999) was a Kosovar political activist and commander of the Kosovo Liberation Army.

== Education ==
Tahiri attended primary school until 1975, at which point he left because of "hostile activities" against the state. His secondary education continued in Bujanovac, but he was expelled after helping organize demonstrations in the spring of 1981.

== Political activity ==
Tahiri was one of the organizers of the 1981 protests that took place on March 11, 1981, in Pristina. While many believed the protest to be spontaneous, it was in fact planned and organized by Gani Koci, Bajram Kosumi, and others. On 1–2 April 1981, organized demonstrations began, asking for recognition of a Kosovar Republic. Tahiri organized his fellow citizens around his ideology of freeing Kosovo from Serbian influence.

Tahiri was the OZK (Operative Zone of Karadak) founder of the Kosovo Liberation Army (KLA) and the first commander of OZK Regulation (military force). He became a Major General in the military force and Tahiri had been active in the leadership of the Union of Political Parties of Gjilan (Albanian: "USPGJ") that acted as a unique body.

Tahiri was later jailed and sentenced to four years imprisonment.

== Death ==
Tahiri's body lies in the cemetery of martyrs in Gjilan.
