= Isak Musliu =

Kosovar former soldier

Isak Musliu (born 31 October 1970) is a former member of Kosovo Liberation Army (KLA or UÇK in Albanian).

== Early life ==
Musliu was born on 31 October 1970 in Reçak, which is now part of Shtime.

== Career ==
He was known as “Çërçiz” during the Yugoslav wars. He was a commander in the Battle of Llapushnik.

After the Kosovo War, he was accused by the International Criminal Tribunal for the former Yugoslavia of a series of beatings and murders in the KLA's Lapušnik prison camp against Serbian civilians and suspected Albanians opposed to the UÇK between May and July 1998 during the Kosovo War. He was accused of being a commander who failed in his duties to follow the Geneva Conventions, and Musliu soon after pleaded not guilty and denied any responsibility for the killings. The most serious incident listed in the indictment is said to have occurred on July 26 that year, when the facility was abandoned in the face of a Serb Army advance. Prosecutors claimed that Haradin Bala and another guard led some 20 prisoners up into nearby mountains, where some were released and the rest were lined up and shot, allegedly on Fatmir Limaj's orders. The prosecution also alleged that Musliu and Limaj ordered the killing of a Kosovar Albanian, who said he was going to the KLA headquarters but was executed and his body left on the street. Witnesses alleged that Qerqiz severely beat them, however, there was no confirmed identification of Musliu during multiple points because he wore a mask at all times.

On 30 November 2005, Musliu was acquitted on all charges. He was released from custody the following day. His acquittal was confirmed on appeal.
