= Witness tampering =

Attempt to influence testimony unduly

Witness tampering is the act of attempting to improperly influence, alter or prevent the testimony of witnesses within criminal or civil proceedings.

Witness tampering and reprisals against witnesses in organized crime cases have been a difficulty faced by prosecutors; witness protection programs were one response to this problem.

== United States ==
In the United States, the federal crime of witness tampering is defined by statute at 18 U.S.C. § 1512, which is entitled "tampering with a witness, victim, or an informant." The statute is broad; the Justice Manual notes that it "proscribes conduct intended to illegitimately affect the presentation of evidence in Federal proceedings or the communication of information to Federal law enforcement officers" and applies to tampering with witnesses in "proceedings before Congress, executive departments, and administrative agencies, and to civil and criminal judicial proceedings, including grand jury proceedings." Witness tampering is a crime even if a proceeding is not actually pending, and even if the testimony sought to be influenced, delayed, or prevented would not be admissible in evidence. Section 1512 also provides that the federal government has extraterritorial jurisdiction to prosecute the offenses described by the section.

Witness tampering is a criminal offense even if the attempt to tamper is unsuccessful. The offense also covers the intimidation of not only a witness themselves, but also intimidation of "another person" (i.e., a third party, such as a witness's spouse) in order to intimidate the witness.

Section 1512 was created as part of the Victim and Witness Protection Act of 1982 (VWPA). Before that time, federal prosecutions "for attempting to or succeeding in corruptly influencing or intimidating witnesses" were prosecuted under the general obstruction of justice statute, 18 U.S.C. § 1503. VWPA established section 1512 to address the specific witness tampering issue, and simultaneously removed references to witnesses from section 1503. This led to uncertainly about whether witness tampering can now be exclusively prosecuted as a federal crime under section 1512, or whether it may also be prosecuted under section 1503 as an alternative or additional charge; the courts of appeals are split on this question.

Notable people in the United States convicted of witness tampering include former South Dakota State Representative Ted Klaudt, political operative Roger Stone, real estate developer Charles Kushner, and Nine Trey Gangsters figure Laron Spicer.

Witness tampering via bribery is not covered by 18 U.S.C. § 1512, but is rather prohibited by a different statute, 18 U.S.C. § 1510. Witness tampering is also a crime under state laws, although the statutory details vary.

== England and Wales ==
In England and Wales, witness intimidation is one form of the crime of perverting the course of justice. Section 51 of the Criminal Justice and Public Order Act 1994 includes the offences of intimidating a witness and taking revenge on a witness. The Serious Organised Crime and Police Act 2005 provides for protections for witnesses at risk of intimidation.

== International Criminal Court ==
In 2016, Jean-Pierre Bemba, a politician from Democratic Republic of the Congo, was convicted of witness tampering in the International Criminal Court. Bemba had separately been convicted of crimes against humanity and war crimes arising from atrocities committed in the Central African Republic in 2002 and 2003, for which he was sentenced to 18 years in prison.

== Economic analysis ==
Economics have analyzed witness intimidation, which is one form of witness tampering, in terms of "strategic complexity and two-sided uncertainty: criminals cannot know whether threats will deter witnesses, and witnesses cannot know whether threats will be carried out." Economists Brendan O'Flaherty and Rajiv Sethi created a model of this problem and suggest that in places where witness intimidation is a serious problem, "communities can be trapped in equilibrium with collective silence: no witness testifies because none expects others to testify."

== See also ==
- Chilling effect
- Kosovo War crimes witness intimidation and deaths
- Informant
- Stop Snitchin'
- Witness protection
