= The Hunt: Me and the War Criminals =

2008 book by Carla Del Ponte

- Author: Carla Del Ponte
- Language: Italian
- Published: April 2008
- Publication place: Italy

The Hunt: Me and the War Criminals (Italian: La caccia: Io e i criminali di guerra) is a book written by Carla Del Ponte, published in April 2008. According to Del Ponte she received information saying about 300 Serbs were kidnapped and transferred to Albania in 1999 where their organs were extracted.

The book caused a considerable controversy with Kosovan and Albanian officials denying these allegations and Russian and Serbian officials demanding more investigation. The ICTY stated no substantial evidence supporting the allegations was brought to the court.

On 12 December 2010, the Council of Europe released a provisional report confirming Ms Del Ponte's allegations, and naming both Shaip Muja, current political adviser to the Kosovar Prime Minister, and Prime Minister Hashim Thaqi himself, in this context.

== Content ==
The book is a memoir that details Del Ponte's eight years (1999-2007) as Chief Prosecutor at the International Criminal Tribunal for the former Yugoslavia. It was co-written with Chuck Sudetic, an American journalist of Croatian descent who covered the Yugoslav wars for the New York Times from 1990 to 1995.

According to the Del Ponte's book, the prosecutor's office received information from UNMIK officials who had in turn received it from "a team of trustworthy journalists" that some 300 kidnapped Serbians were taken with trucks from Kosovo to several camps in Kukës and Tropojë in Albania during the summer of 1999, shortly after the arrival of NATO troops in Kosovo. Captives were taken to locations including a shack behind a yellow house south in Burrel where doctors removed their organs. The organs were then smuggled out of country and sold abroad. The smuggling was carried out with the knowledge and involvement of some elements of the Kosovo Liberation Army (KLA) who also profited from it. The allegations are covered in a chapter in the book called "Kosovo 1999-2007".

== Reactions ==
=== Organisations ===
The International Criminal Tribunal for the former Yugoslavia had said of Del Ponte's allegations: "The Tribunal is aware of very serious allegations of human organ trafficking raised by the former Prosecutor, Carla Del Ponte, in a book recently published in Italian under her name. No evidence in support of such allegations was ever brought before the Tribunal's judges."

A spokeswoman for the UN War Crimes Tribunal says that during a preliminary investigation in cooperation with Albania and UNMIK "no reliable evidence had been obtained to substantiate the allegations."

On 4 April 2008, the Human Rights Watch wrote to Kosovar Prime Minister Hashim Thaci and Albanian Prime Minister Sali Berisha in request to open investigations on the matter under international supervision. By 3 May both had ignored the letters and instead publicly rejected Del Ponte's claims as unsubstantiated. On 5 May 2008, the Human Rights Watch called the allegations from Del Ponte's book "serious and credible" and issued a public call to Tirana and Pristina for cooperation.

The reported alleges the victims were more than 400 Serbs missing from the war. "Serious and credible allegations have emerged about horrible abuses in Kosovo and Albania after the war", said Fred Abrahams, HWR Senior emergencies researcher of HRW.

According to the journalists' information, the abducted individuals were held in warehouses and other buildings, including facilities in Kukës and Tropoje. In comparison to other captives, some of the sources said, some of the younger, healthier detainees were fed, examined by doctors, and never beaten. These abducted individuals – an unknown number – were allegedly transferred to a yellow house in or around the Albanian town of Burrel, where doctors extracted the captives' internal organs. These organs were then transported out of Albania via the airport near the capital Tirana. Most of the alleged victims were Serbs who went missing after the arrival of UN and NATO forces in Kosovo. But other captives were women from Kosovo, Albania, Russia, and other Slavic countries.

A provisional report by the Council of Europe, released on 12 December 2010, confirmed the allegations. An EU Report released in 2014 concluded that organ theft and trafficking took place but "on a very limited scale with a few individuals involved".

=== Albania ===
Pandeli Majko, Albanian Prime Minister during the Kosovo war, has rejected the allegations in Del Ponte's book as "strange stories, a fantasy".

=== Kosovo ===
Nekibe Kelmendi, Kosovo's Minister of Justice said Del Ponte's allegations "are pure fabrications made by Del Ponte or perhaps Serbia herself" and that "if she knew of such cases then she should be charged with withholding evidence and hiding these crimes".

The Council for the Defense of Human Rights and Freedoms announced that they would sue Del Ponte for publishing lies in her book.

=== Serbia ===
Serbia and Russia both called for an investigation. Vladan Batić, Serbia's former justice minister, stated that "If her allegations are true, then this is the most monstrous crime since the times of Mengele".

=== Switzerland ===
The Swiss government has asked Del Ponte not to promote her book. It has been criticized for tarnishing the country's celebrated neutrality, particularly as Del Ponte has been named as the Swiss ambassador to Argentina.

== Editions ==
- Chuck Sudetic, Carla Del Ponte, La caccia: Io e i criminali di guerra, Feltrinelli, Milano, (2008), ISBN 88-07-17144-9.
