= Lapušnik prison camp =

Prison camp operated by the KLA, an Albanian militant organization

- Concentration camp
- Location: Lapušnik, Kosovo, FR Yugoslavia
- Operated by: KLA
- Original use: imprisonment, cruel treatment, inhuman acts, and executions.
- Operational: 1998
- Inmates: Serbs and Albanians
- Number of inmates: 35+
- Killed: 23

Lapušnik prison camp was a detention camp (also referred to as a prison) that was operated by the Kosovo Liberation Army, an Albanian militant organization, near the city of Drenas in central Kosovo during the Kosovo War. It was operational in early 1998 and inmates were subject to intimidation, imprisonment, violence and murder. The victims were both Serbs and Albanians.

== History ==
The camp was established after the Battle of Lapušnik. According to the early indictments, in early 1998, KLA forces under the command of Fatmir Limaj and Isak Musliu detained Serb and Albanian civilians from the municipalities of Shtime, Drenas and Lipjan for prolonged periods in the camp. On 25 or 26 July, the KLA abandoned the camp when the Yugoslav Army began its advance on Lapušnik.

== Indictments ==
In 2003, the International Criminal Tribunal for the former Yugoslavia (ICTY) charged Fatmir Limaj, Isak Musliu and Haradin Bala. In November 2005, all of the defendants except Haradin Bala were acquitted and released. Bala, who was a guard at the camp, was sentenced to 13 years in prison for persecution on political, racial and religious grounds and for cruel treatment, murders and for his role in maintenance and enforcement of inhumane conditions in the camp. Although the exact number of inmates is unknown, 9 were executed in the mountains by Haradin Bala and two other guards.

== See also ==
- War crimes in the Kosovo War
