= Rrustem Mustafa =

KLA commander and politician

Rustem Mustafa
- Other name: Remi
- Military career
- Allegiance: Kosova
- Branch: Kosovo Liberation Army
- Rank: Former Commander
- Unit: Llap Operational Zone
- Conflicts: Kosovo war

Rustem Mustafa, also known Remi, was the former commander of the Kosovo Liberation Army's (KLA) Llap Operational Zone. Born in Kosovo, Mustafa played a significant role in the armed conflict between Serbian forces and the KLA during the late 1990s.

== Career ==
During the Kosovo war, Mustafa was commander of the Kosovo Liberation Army's Llap Operational Zone.

In 2002, he was arrested by KFOR forces and international police following a warrant and charged with murder, torture and illegal detention of persons. He was suspected of torturing and killing five people he had illegally taken into his control. In 2013, Mustafa was found guilty of torturing prisoners at a wartime KLA detention center and sentenced to four years' imprisonment. This conviction was later confirmed on appeal.

Despite his past conviction, Mustafa was hired as a political adviser by former President Hashim Thaci in 2019.

Mustafa's involvement in the KLA led him to testify at the trial of former Kosovo President Hashim Thaci and three co-defendants at the Kosovo Specialist Chambers in The Hague. The prosecution accused Thaci and his co-defendants of war crimes and crimes against humanity committed during and after the Kosovo war. In his testimony, Mustafa disputed the prosecution's claims and highlighted the lack of a respected hierarchy within the KLA's general staff. He stated that the guerrilla force did not have an established army structure led by politicians and civilians but that operational zone commanders like himself were instead responsible for making decisions.
