= Fatmir Limaj =

Kosovar politician

Deputy Prime Minister of Kosovo
- In office 9 September 2017 – 26 December 2019
- Prime Minister: Ramush Haradinaj

Leader of NISMA
- Incumbent
- Assumed office 28 February 2014
- Preceded by: New Office

Minister of Transport and Telecommunication in the Government of Kosovo
- In office 9 January 2008 – 18 October 2010

Personal details
- Born: 4 February 1971 (age 55) Banje, Malishevë, SAP Kosovo, SR Serbia, SFR Yugoslavia (now Kosovo)
- Party: Democratic Party (1999–2014); NISMA (2014–present)
- Nickname: Çeliku (nom de guerre)

Military service
- Allegiance: Kosova
- Branch/service: Kosovo Liberation Army
- Battles/wars: Kosovo War: Battle of Llapushnik; KLA Summer offensive; Yugoslav offensive in Kosovo (1998)

Fatmir Limaj (born 4 February 1971), is a Kosovo Albanian politician. He is the leader of Nisma Socialdemokrate. Limaj served as Minister of Transport and Telecommunication in the government of the Republic of Kosovo. He was known as "Çeliku" during the Yugoslav wars.

== Biography ==
Limaj was born in the village of Banje, in the municipality of Suva Reka, Kosovo, (then Yugoslavia). His family is alleged to descend from the Thaçi tribe (fis), a claim that was made by Hashim Thaçi, a member of the tribe and the former Prime Minister of Kosovo, during an interview on the Albanian show "Oxygen". During the 1999 Kosovo War, Limaj was a commander of the Kosovo Liberation Army (KLA), in the Llapushnik area. He took part in the Battle of Llapusnik as a commander. His alias was Çeliku.

After the war he was one of the founders of what is now Kosovo's largest political party, the Democratic Party of Kosovo. After his indictment, which he was freed from in 2007 (see below), he returned to politics. From 2007 to 2010, he served as the Minister of Transport.

In the elections held in December 2010 he was third most voted leader in the whole country but he decided not to be part of the government. In 2014, he co-founded the Initiative for Kosovo Party (NISMA).

Fatmir was Deputy Prime Minister of Kosovo in the cabinet of Ramush Haradinaj from September 2017 to February 2020.

== War crimes charges ==
Limaj was arrested on 18 February 2003, in Slovenia. The International Criminal Tribunal for the former Yugoslavia (ICTY) charged him, Isak Musliu and Haradin Bala with war crimes against Serbs and Albanians regarding illegal imprisonment, cruel treatment, inhuman acts, and murders in Lapušnik prison camp.

On 4 March 2003, he was sent to The Hague, and on 15 November 2004, the trial began. In November 2005, Limaj was acquitted by the ICTY.

In September 2007, The Appeals Chamber found that "the Trial Chamber reasonably found that Fatmir Limaj does not incur criminal responsibility for any of the offences charged in the indictment," Judge Fausto Pocar said.

Limaj was charged in another war crime case by European Union Rule of Law Mission in Kosovo (EULEX) known as the "Klecka case". Prosecutors alleged that Limaj and others kept Serb and Albanian prisoners in a camp in the village of Klecka, subjecting them to inhumane conditions and beatings; seven Serbs and one Albanian was killed by subordinates under Limaj's command. The indictment was largely based on the diary of former KLA soldier Agim Zogaj who was one of the guards at the camp and subsequently committed suicide after repeated threats on his life. Limaj was acquitted in May 2012 along with three of his aides. The court found that Zogaj ("Witness X")'s diary and testimony was inadmissible. However, in November 2012, the Kosovo Supreme Court overruled the decision and ordered a re-trial. In May 2017, the Supreme Court acquitted him and the other defendants.

In 2018, Limaj was found not guilty of war crimes by an international court for failing to prevent the killing of two Albanians during the Kosovo War.
