= Kleçka =

Village in Lipjan, Kosovo

- Village
- Location within Kosovo
- Coordinates: 42.4928783°N 20.8589286°E
- Country: Kosovo
- District: Pristina
- Municipality: Lipjan
- Elevation: 868 m (2,848 ft)

Population (2024)
  - Total: 124
- Time zone: UTC+1 (CET)
  - Summer (DST): UTC+2 (CEST)

Kleçka (Albanian: Kleçkë; Serbian: Klečka) or Kleqkë is a village in the municipality of Lipjan, Kosovo. The village is home to 124 inhabitants, all of whom being ethnic Albanians.

During the Kosovo War, the village became infamous due to the so-called "Klecka case."
