= Gnjilane killings =

Murders of Kosovar Serbs

- Location: Gjilan, Kosovo and Metohija, Yugoslavia (now Kosovo)
- Date: June–October 1999 (Central European Time)
- Target: Kosovar Serbs
- Attack type: Abduction, torture, rape, mass killing
- Deaths: 51
- Perpetrator: KLA Gjilan Group

The Gnjilane killings was the abduction, torture and mass murder of Kosovar Serb civilians in the Yugoslav town of Gnjilane by members of the Kosovo Liberation Army's (KLA) Gnjilane group from June to October 1999, in the aftermath of the Kosovo War.

== Case ==
Following the withdrawal of Yugoslav forces from Kosovo on 10 June 1999, the "Gjilan group" gathered into the city of Gjilan where according to trial testimony, they were ordered to "cleanse" the remaining Serbs living in the town. The group is believed to have kidnapped 159 Serb civilians and killed at least 51 people between June and October 1999. The group consisted of ethnic Albanians from Preševo, Bujanovac and Medveđa, and Albanians of western Republic of Macedonia.

On 26 December 2008, Serbian authorities arrested 10 ex-KLA members from Gjilan group suspected of torturing, looting and raping Serb and non-Serb civilians.

According to the indictment, Serbs were imprisoned in the basement of a local boarding school, where they were tortured, mutilated, and killed. Victims had their nails pulled out, tongues stabbed with knives, lighters hammered into skulls, and were in the end choked with plastic bags and garroted with wires. To conceal their crimes, the killers dismembered the bodies and threw them into nearby dumpsters, and in Livoč Lake. The defendants were also suspected of having raped women and sexually abusing prisoners. The indictment was based on victims' testimonies, supported by medical experts, as well as information provided by an ex-KLA member.

== Trials ==
On 21 January 2011, the Belgrade Higher Court sentenced nine former KLA members to a total of 101 years for torturing, raping and murdering Serb and other civilians in the eastern Kosovo town of Gnjilane. The perpetrators were Ahmet Hasani, Nazif Hasani, Ferat Hajdari, Kamber Sahiti, Burim Fazliu, Faton Hajdari, Samet Hajdari, Selmon Sadiku and Agush Memishi.

The War Crime Chamber of the Appellate Court in Belgrade quashed the verdict on 7 December 2011 and set the case for a retrial. On 19 September 2012, the group, which by then totaled 11 individuals, was sentenced to a combined 116 years in prison. Meanwhile, Fazli Hajdari, Rexhep Aliu, Shaqir Shaqiri, Idriz Aliu and Ramadan Halimi, who were previously on the run, were cleared of all charges and the international warrant for their arrest was revoked. Shemsi Nuhiu, who was extradited to Serbia in May 2012, was also released. The presiding judge noted however, that while the court accepted the testimonies of the protected witnesses as authentic, it acknowledged discrepancies in their accounts. Furthermore, while the witnesses described the events in Gjilan, they were not specific to the events outlined in the indictment, and they did not name the specific defendants as the perpetrators. The testimony of a key witness was also dismissed and the prosecution was accused of misusing the victims' suffering.

On 11-12 May 2013, Albanians as well Albanian political parties from the Southern Serbian region of Preševo held a protest in the Preševo city square, demanding the release of the group. In November 2013, the Serbian Appeals Court and Higher Court acquitted the eleven individuals who were previously found guilty and released them. The decision was criticized by Serbia's Office of War crimes prosecution.
