= Llapushnik =

Llapushnik Llapushniku
- Village
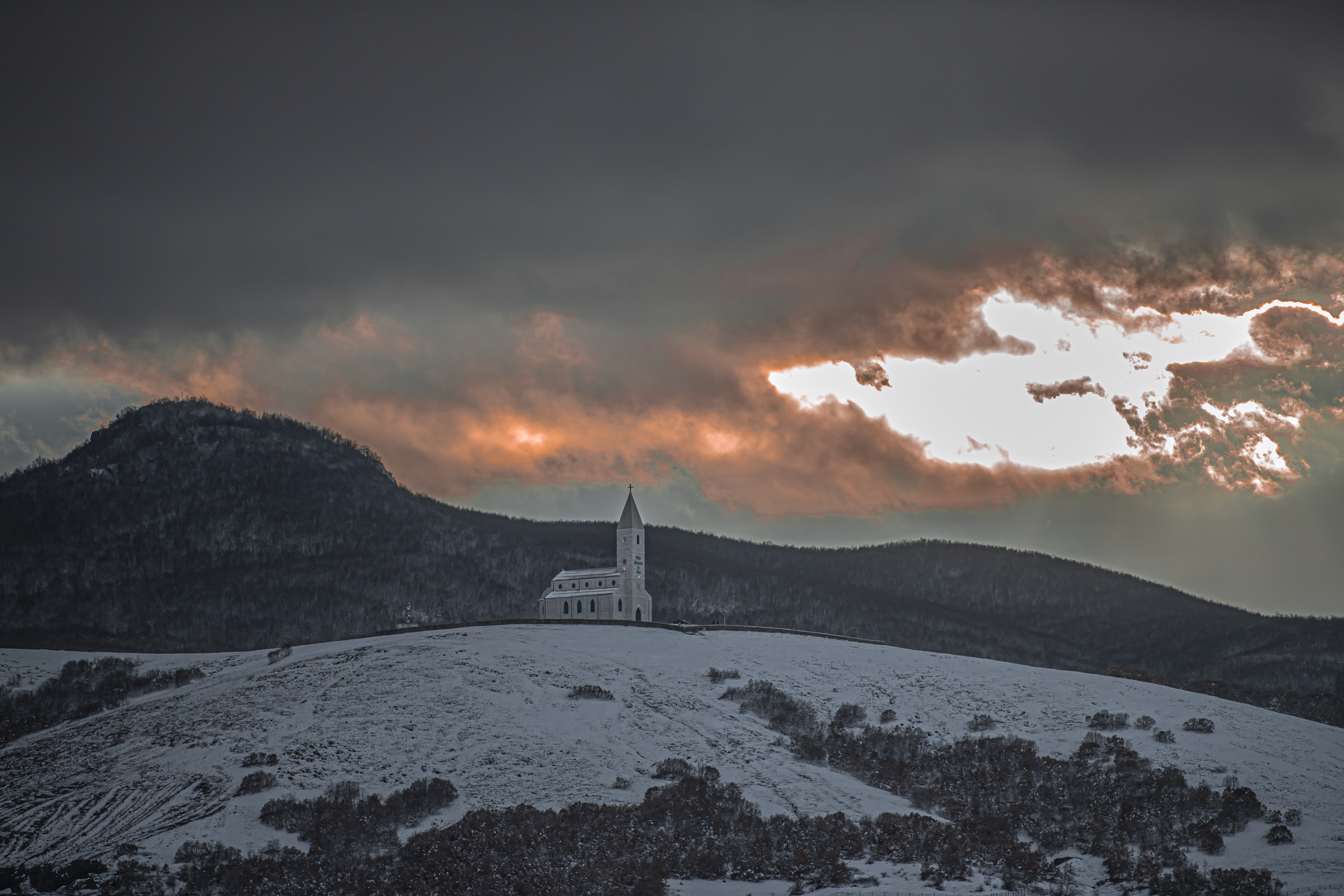
- Church in Llapushnik

- Location in Kosovo
- Location: Kosovo
- District: Pristina
- Municipality: Drenas

Government

Population (2024)
  - Total: 2,904
- Time zone: UTC+1 (CET)
  - Summer (DST): UTC+2 (CEST)
- Postal code: 13000

Llapushnik (or Llapushniku) is a village in municipality Drenas in Kosovo. (Note: Drenas=Kosove)

== Demography ==
Demographics
Year	Population
1948
1953
1961
1971
1981
1991
Ref: Federal Office of Statistics and Evidence of Federal People's Republic of Yugoslavia and Socialist Federal Republic of Yugoslavia, census for 1948, 1953, 1961, 1971, 1981. and 1991.

== History ==
The village became notorious after 1998 because of the Lapušnik prison camp operated by the Albanian militant organization the UÇK. It also had a famous battle with the KLA and Yugoslav forces, which led to an KLA victory in 1998 known as the First Battle of Llapushnik. Yugoslav forces seized back control of Llapushnik on 27 July 1998 after a second battle.
