= Malishevë, Gjilan =

Malishevë: Malishevë (Albanian); Малишево/Mališevo (Serbian)
- Village
- Location within Kosovo
- Coordinates: 42°27′10″N 21°30′25″E
- Location: Kosovo
- District: Gjilan
- Municipality: Gjilan

Population (2024)
  - Total: 2,732
- Time zone: UTC+1 (Central European Time)
  - Summer (DST): UTC+2 (CEST)

Malishevë is a village in the District of Gjilan, Kosovo. It is located southeast of Gjilan.
