= Haradin Bala =

Kosovar military commander; convicted war criminal (1957–2018)

Haradin Bala (10 June 1957 – 31 January 2018), also known as Shala, was a Kosovo Albanian former commander of the Albanian militant organization Kosovo Liberation Army (KLA, or UÇK in Albanian).

He was convicted of war crimes and crimes against humanity against Serbs and moderate Albanians by the International Criminal Tribunal for the former Yugoslavia. His trial ended on 30 November 2005 and he was sentenced to 13 years’ imprisonment, particularly for crimes at the Lapušnik prison camp between May and July 1998 and executing orders to kill Serb civilians in the Berisha Mountains on 25 July 1998, after the fall of Lapušnik as a result of the Serbian Army advances in Kosovo. In 2013, Bala was freed from prison on early release.

Bala died on 31 January 2018. The following day, a minute of silence was held in Assembly of the Republic of Kosovo to mark his death. It was proposed by the deputy Milaim Zeka of the Social Democratic Initiative. "All people in the world honour their values, their people, their heroes," Zeka remarked. "Last night, a great man passed away, a man that has made a great contribution to this country, this nation, and thanks to him, we are sitting here now in the parliament of Kosovo."
