= Kosovo Liberation Army =

Kosovo paramilitary organization (1990s–1999)

- Ushtria Çlirimtare e Kosovës
- Leaders: Adem Jashari †; Agim Çeku; Azem Syla; Ismet Asllani †; Sami Lushtaku; Zahir Pajaziti †; Rrustem Mustafa; Ramush Haradinaj (WIA); Ismet Jashari †; Agim Çelaj †; Fatmir Limaj; Rrahman Rama; Shukri Buja; Ahmet Isufi
- Founded: 17 November 1994
- Dates active: 1990s – 20 September 1999 (est. 1992–93 but relatively passive until 1996)
- Active regions: Yugoslavia; Serbia; AP Kosovo and Metohija; Albania; Kukës County; Kukës; Tropojë
- Ideology: Albanian nationalism Greater Albania (Note: See); Kosovo–Albania unionism Anti-Serb sentiment
- Size: Before 1997: 150; Before 1998: 300; Early 1998: 500; After 1998: 6,000–20,000, 20,000, 24,000 (April–May 1999), or 25,000–30,000
- Wars: Kosovo War
- Flag

The Kosovo Liberation Army (KLA; Albanian: Ushtria Çlirimtare e Kosovës [uʃˈtɾija t͡ʃliɾimˈtaɾɛ ɛ ˈkɔsɔvəs], UÇK) was an ethnic Albanian separatist militia that sought the secession of Kosovo, the vast majority of which is inhabited by Albanians, from the Federal Republic of Yugoslavia during the 1990s. Albanian nationalism was a central tenet of the KLA and many in its ranks supported the creation of a Greater Albania, which would encompass all Albanians in the Balkans, stressing Albanian culture, ethnicity and nation.

Military precursors to the KLA began in the late 1980s with armed resistance to Yugoslav police trying to take Albanian activists in custody. By the early 1990s there were attacks on police forces and secret-service officials who abused Albanian civilians. By mid-1998, the KLA was involved in frontal battle though it was outnumbered and outgunned. Conflict escalated from 1997 onward due to the Yugoslav army retaliating with a crackdown in the region which resulted in population displacements. The bloodshed, ethnic cleansing of thousands of Albanians driving them into neighbouring countries and the potential of it to destabilize the region provoked intervention by international organizations, such as the United Nations, NATO and INGOs. NATO conducted a bombing campaign against Yugoslav forces and provided air support to the KLA.

In September 1999, with the fighting over and an international force in place within Kosovo, the KLA was officially disbanded and thousands of its members entered the Kosovo Protection Corps, a civilian emergency protection body that replaced the KLA and Kosovo Police Force, as foreseen in United Nations Security Council Resolution 1244. The ending of the Kosovo war resulted in the emergence of offshoot guerrilla groups and political organisations from the KLA continuing violent struggles in southern Serbia (1999–2001) and northwestern Macedonia (2001); these struggles resulted in peace talks and greater Albanian rights. Former KLA leaders also entered politics, some of them reaching high-ranking offices.

The KLA received large funds from Albanian diaspora organizations. There have been allegations that it used narcoterrorism to finance its operations. Abuses and war crimes were committed by the KLA during and after the conflict, such as massacres of civilians, prison camps and destruction of cultural heritage sites. In April 2014, the Assembly of Kosovo considered and approved the establishment of a special court to try cases involving crimes and other serious abuses allegedly committed in 1999–2000 by members of the KLA. In June 2020, the Kosovo Specialist Chambers and Specialist Prosecutor's Office filed indictments for crimes against humanity and war crimes against a number of former KLA members, including the former president of Kosovo Hashim Thaçi, who were found guilty of war crimes in 2026.

== Background ==
A key precursor to the Kosovo Liberation Army was the People's Movement of Kosovo (LPK). This group, which argued Kosovo's freedom could be won only through armed struggle, traces back to 1982, and played a crucial role in the creation of the KLA in 1993. Fund-raising began in the 1980s in Switzerland by Albanian exiles of the violence of 1981 and subsequent émigrés. Slobodan Milošević revoked Kosovan autonomy in 1989, returning the region to its 1945 status, ejecting ethnic Albanians from the Kosovan bureaucracy and violently putting down protests. In response, Kosovar Albanians established the Democratic League of Kosovo (LDK). Headed by Ibrahim Rugova, its goal was independence from Serbia, but via peaceful means. To this end, the LDK set up and developed a "parallel state" with a particular focus on education and healthcare.

Albanian nationalism was a central tenet of the KLA and many in its ranks supported the creation of a Greater Albania, which would encompass all Albanians in the Balkans, (Note: See) stressing Albanian culture, ethnicity and nation. The KLA itself disavowed the creation of a 'Greater Albania'. The KLA made its name known publicly for the first time in 1995, and a first public appearance followed in 1997, at which time its membership was still only around 200. Critical of the progress made by Rugova, the KLA received boosts from the 1995 Dayton Accords— these granted Kosovo nothing, and so generated a more widespread rejection of the LDK's peaceful methods — and from looted weaponry that spilled into Kosovo after the Albanian rebellion of 1997. During 1997–98, the Kosovo Liberation Army moved ahead of Rugova's LDK, a fact starkly illustrated by the KLA's Hashim Thaçi leading the Kosovar Albanians at the Rambouillet negotiations of spring 1999, with Rugova as his deputy.

In February 1996, the KLA undertook a series of attacks against police stations and Yugoslav government officers, saying that they had killed Albanian civilians as part of an ethnic cleansing campaign. Later that year, the British weekly The European carried an article by a French expert stating that "German civil and military intelligence services have been involved in training and equipping the rebels with the aim of cementing German influence in the Balkan area. (...) The birth of the KLA in 1996 coincided with the appointment of Hansjoerg Geiger as the new head of the BND (German secret Service). (...) The BND men were in charge of selecting recruits for the KLA command structure from the 500,000 Kosovars in Albania." Matthias Küntzel tried to prove later on that German secret diplomacy had been instrumental in helping the KLA since its creation.

Serbian authorities denounced the KLA as a terrorist organisation and increased the number of security forces in the region. This had the effect of boosting the credibility of the embryonic KLA among the Kosovar Albanian population. Not long before NATO's military action commenced, the U.S. Committee for Refugees and Immigrants reported that "Kosovo Liberation Army ... [conducted] attacks aimed at trying to 'cleanse' Kosovo of its ethnic Serb population."

One of the goals mentioned by the KLA commanders was the formation of Greater Albania, an irredentist concept of lands that are considered to form the national homeland by many Albanians, encompassing Kosovo, Albania, and the ethnic Albanian minority of neighbouring Macedonia and Montenegro.

== Kosovo War ==
Between 5 and 7 March 1998, the Yugoslav Police launched an operation on Prekaz. The operation followed an earlier firefight (28 February) in which four policemen were killed and several more were wounded; Adem Jashari, a KLA leader, escaped. In Prekaz, 28 militants were killed, along with 30 civilians, most of whom belonged to Jashari's family. Amnesty International claimed that it was a military operation focused primarily on the elimination of Jashari and his family.

On 23 April 1998, the Yugoslav Army (VJ) ambushed the KLA near the Albanian-Yugoslav border. The KLA had tried to smuggle arms and supplies into Kosovo. The Yugoslav Army, although greatly outnumbered, had no casualties, while 19 militants were killed.

According to Roland Keith, a field office director of the OSCE's Kosovo Verification Mission:

Upon my arrival the war increasingly evolved into a mid-intensity conflict as ambushes, the encroachment of critical lines of communication and the [KLA] kidnapping of security forces resulted in a significant increase in government casualties which in turn led to major Yugoslavian reprisal security operations... By the beginning of March these terror and counter-terror operations led to the inhabitants of numerous villages fleeing, or being dispersed to either other villages, cities or the hills to seek refuge... The situation was clearly that KLA provocations, as personally witnessed in ambushes of security patrols which inflicted fatal and other casualties, were clear violations of the previous October's agreement [and United Nations Security Council Resolution 1199].

At one point during the Kosovo War, the KLA changed its tactics from hit and run operations to conventional warfare. In July 1998, the KLA captured the towns of Orahovac and Mališevo and expanded their occupation of territory to 40% of Kosovo. However, without enough manpower and heavy weaponry to defend their gains, both towns quickly fell to Yugoslav forces. Their occupation of Orahovac was marred by acts of atrocities committed against Serb civilians. On 24 August 1998, the KLA reverted to guerrilla warfare and employed new tactics including the appointment of new commanders, central authorities, expanded training camps and military prisons.

The KLA had 7 operational zones: Drenica, Pashtrik, Dukagjin, Shala, Llap, Nerodime, Karadak. The KLA had 28 brigades, with 31 formations (including 126th, 127th, and 128th brigades) in total, multiple for each operational zone.

In Drenica, 111th “Adem Jashari” Brigade, 112th “Arben Haliti” Brigade, 113th “Mujë Krasniqi” Brigade, and the 114th “Fehmi Lladrovci” Brigade.

In Pashtrik, 121st “Ismet Jashari” Brigade, 122nd “Imer Krasniqi” Brigade, 123rd “Suhareka” Brigade, 124th “Gani Paçarizi” Brigade, 125th “Pashtriku” Brigade, 126th “Hasi” Brigade, 127th “Dragashi” Brigade, and the 128th “Sulmuese” Brigade.

In Dukagjin, 131st “Jusuf Gërvalla” Brigade, 132nd “Myrtë Zeneli” Brigade, 133rd “Adrian Krasniqi” Brigade, 134th “Bedri Shala” Brigade, 135th “Agim Zeneli” Brigade, 136th “Rugova” Brigade, 137th “Gjakova” Brigade, and the 138th “Agim Ramadani” Brigade.

In Shala, 141st “Mehë Uka” Brigade, and the 142nd “Shala e Bajgorës” Brigade.

In Llap, 151st “Zahir Pajaziti” Brigade, 152nd “Shaban Shala” Brigade, and the 153rd “Hyzri Talla” Brigade.

In Nerodime, 161st “Ahmet Kaçiku” Brigade, 162nd “Arben Bajrami” Brigade, and the 163rd “Gafurr Loku” Brigade.

In Karadak, 171st “Kadri Zeka” Brigade, 172nd “Isa Kastrati” Brigade, and 173rd “Gursel and Bajram Sylejmani” Brigade.

Some sources say that the KLA never won a battle, while others say it won relatively few battles.

== Funding ==
The KLA received large funds from the Albanian diaspora in Europe and the United States, but also from Albanian businessmen in Kosovo, notably Ismet Asllani, who dedicated his entire wealth and logistics network to supporting the war effort across regions such as Drenica, Dukagjin, and Llap. It is estimated that those funds amounted to $75 million to $100 million and mainly came from the Albanian diaspora in Switzerland, United States and Germany. The KLA received the majority of its funds through the Homeland Calls Fund, but significant funds were also transferred directly to the war zones. Apart from the financial contributions, the KLA also received contributions in kind, especially from the United States and Switzerland. These included weapons, but also military fatigues, boots and other supporting equipment.

According to the Stockholm International peace research institute: In 1999, the KLA's source of arms were Switzerland, Bosnia and Herzegovina, Albania, and United States with non-state armament through the Albanian diaspora, whereas the Armed Forces of Serbia and Montenegro were funded by Israel. The weaponry received through Albania were often cheap and faulty often so bad that KLA smugglers could buy a Kalashnikov for as little as $5.

The KLA received its funding in multiple decentralized ways. Apart from the Homeland Calls Fund, which mostly went to KLA operations in the Drenica region, the KLA also received donations through personal contacts of commanders with Albanians in the diaspora. Members of the diaspora usually stressed the difficulties through which KLA's soldiers were going through to fight an uneven battle. They often used stories of KLA members or civilian survivors of massacres to convince others to donate. After collection, the money was then transferred to its destination in different ways. The secrecy of the Swiss banking system allowed some of the funding to be transferred directly to the locations where military equipment would be purchased. From the United States, most of the money was legally carried by individuals in suitcases, who reported to the FBI and other federal authorities that they were sending money to the KLA. The KLA also received some funding from the Three-Percent Fund, which was set up by the institutions of Republic of Kosova led by Bujar Bukoshi and was also collected from the Albanian diaspora.

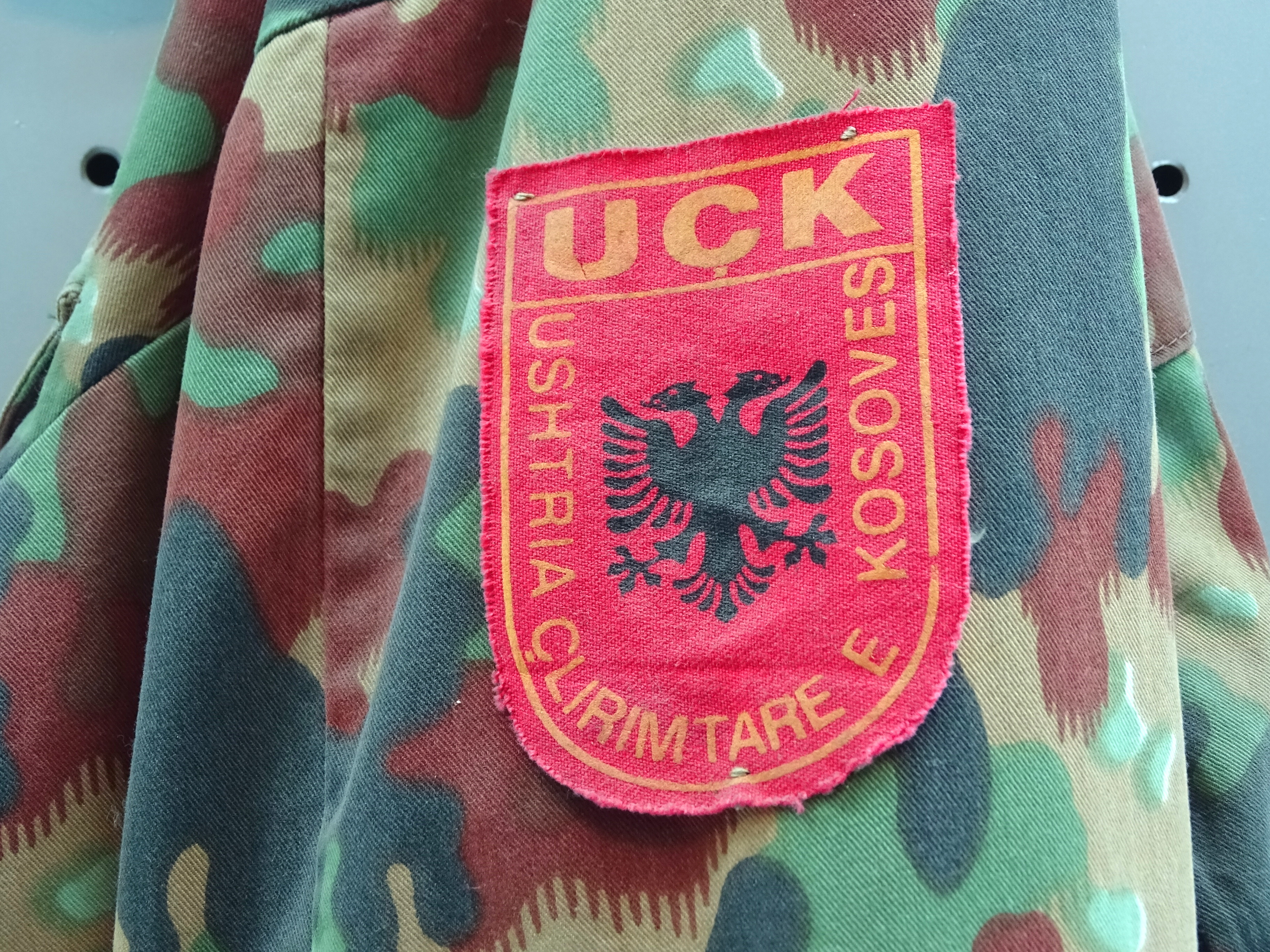
Uniform and Badge of Kosovo Liberation Army, Military Museum, Belgrade

According to some sources, the KLA may have received funds from individuals involved in drug trade. However, insufficient evidence exists that the KLA itself was involved in such activities. For example, Swiss citizens believe that elements of the Albanian community in Switzerland control narcotics trade in Switzerland. Some of the money earned through these illegal activities may have gone to the KLA through contributions to the Homeland Calls Fund or through the usual funding channels in which individuals and businessmen engaged in legitimate economic activities donated. This, however, is insufficient evidence to claim that the KLA itself got involved in narcotics trade or other criminal activities.

In a hearing before the United States House Judiciary Subcommittee on Crime, Terrorism and Homeland Security, Ralf Mutschke from the Interpol General Secretariat claimed that half of the funding that had reached the KLA, which he estimated to have been 900 million DM in total, may have come from drug trafficking. Mother Jones obtained a congressional briefing paper for the U.S. Congress, which stated: "We would be remiss to dismiss allegations that between 30 and 50 percent of the KLA's money comes from drugs." Furthermore, journalist Peter Klebnikov added that after the NATO bombing, KLA-linked heroin traffickers began using Kosovo again as a major supply route. Citing German Federal Police, he said that in 2000, an estimated 80% of Europe's heroin supply was controlled by Kosovar Albanians. According to scholars Gary Dempsey and Roger Fontaine, by 1999, Western intelligence agencies estimated that over $250m of narcotics money had found its way into KLA coffers. Scholar Henry Perritt, who studied the KLA, argues that "[a]ll available evidence refutes the proposition aggressively advanced by the Milosevic regime that the KLA was mainly financed by drug and prostitution money."

== Recruitment ==
=== In Kosovo ===
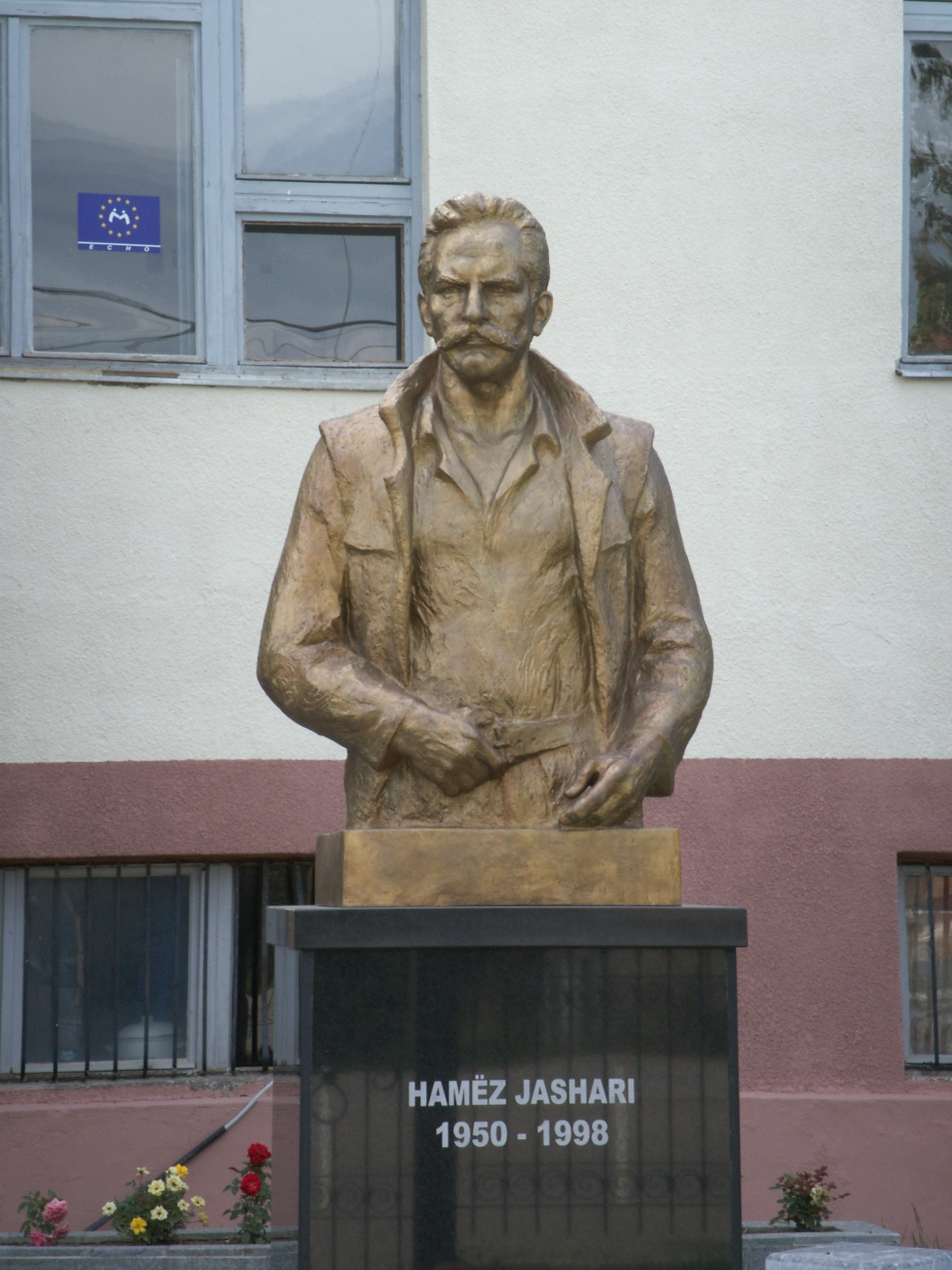
Statue of Hamëz Jashari

The original core of KLA in the early 1990s was a closely-knitted group of commanders consisting of commissioned and non-commissioned officers belonging to reserve, regular and territorial defense units of the Yugoslav army (JNA). In 1996, the KLA consisted of only a few hundred fighters. Within the context of the armed struggle, in 1996-1997 a report by the CIA noted that the KLA could mobilize tens of thousands of supporters in Kosovo within a two to three year time frame. By the end of 1998, the KLA had 17,000 men. While religion was not an explicit ideology of the KLA, it was made up of ethnic albanians who are majority muslim.

=== Foreign volunteers ===
Albanian recruits from neighbouring Macedonia joined the KLA and their numbers ranged from several dozen into the thousands. Following the war, some Albanians from Macedonia have felt that their military participation and assistance to fellow Kosovar Albanians during the conflict has not been properly recognised in Kosovo.

Former KLA spokesman Jakup Krasniqi said that volunteers came from "Sweden, Belgium, the UK, Germany and the U.S." The KLA included many foreign volunteers from Western Europe, mostly from Germany and Switzerland, and also ethnic Albanians from the U.S. Roland Bartetzko was one of the German volunteers who reportedly fought in the KLA.

According to the Serbian Ministry of Foreign Affairs, by September 1998 there were foreign mercenaries from Albania, Saudi Arabia, Yemen, Afghanistan, Bosnia and Herzegovina (Muslims) and Chechnya in the KLA ranks. Citing a 2003 report by the Serbian government, academics Lyubov Mincheva and Ted Gurr claim that the Abu Bekir Sidik mujahideen unit of 115 members operated in Drenica in May–June 1998, and dozens of its members were Saudis and Egyptians, reportedly funded by Islamist organizations. They further claim that the group was later disbanded, and no permanent Jihadist presence was established. The failure of Islamist groups to gain a foothold within the ranks of the separatist movement is related to the secular foundation of Albanian nationalism and the heavily secular attitudes of Kosovo Albanians which did not leave room for the development of Islamist ideologies. On 18 July 1998, the VJ ambushed a column of KLA militants and foreign mujahideen, killing 4 militants and 18 mujahideen. Human Rights Watch advisor Fred C. Abrahams speculates that the KLA may have deliberately led the mujahideen into a trap by the KLA as part of a plan to reduce the influence of Islamic extremists within the organization's ranks.

During the Kosovo conflict Milošević and his supporters portrayed the KLA as a terrorist organisation of militant Islam. The CIA advised the KLA to avoid involvement with Muslim extremists. The KLA rejected offers of assistance from Muslim fundamentalists. There was an understanding within the ranks of the KLA that foreign assistance from Muslim fundamentalists would limit support toward the cause of Kosovo Albanians in the West.

== Aftermath (post–1999) ==
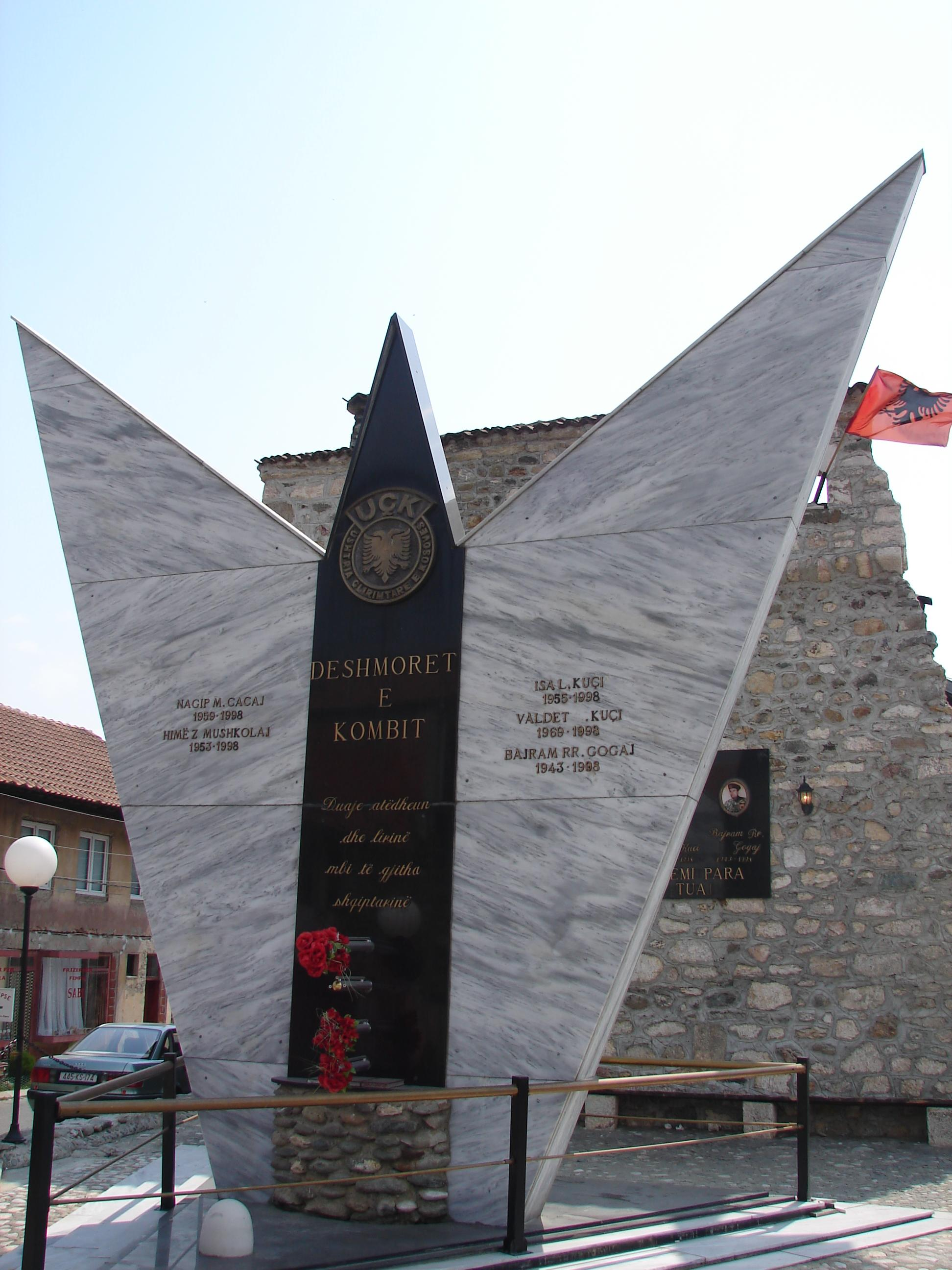
UÇK monument in Deçan

After the war, the KLA was transformed into the Kosovo Protection Corps, which worked alongside NATO forces patrolling the province until 2009. In 2000, there was unrest in Mitrovica, with a Yugoslav police officer and physician killed, and three officers and a physician wounded in February. In March, the FRY complained about the escalation of violence in the region, claiming this showed that the KLA was still active. Between April and September the FRY issued several documents to the UN Security Council about violence against Serbs and other non-Albanians.

Some people from non-Albanian communities such as the Serbs and Romani fled Kosovo, some fearing revenge attacks by armed people and returning refugees and others were pressured by the KLA and armed gangs to leave. The Yugoslav Red Cross had estimated a total of 30,000 refugees and internally displaced persons (IDPs) from Kosovo, most of whom were Serb. The UNHCR estimated the figure at 55,000 refugees who had fled to Montenegro and Central Serbia, most of whom were Kosovo Serbs: "Over 90 mixed villages in Kosovo have now been emptied of Serb inhabitants and other Serbs continue leaving, either to be displaced in other parts of Kosovo or fleeing into central Serbia."

In post war Kosovo, KLA fighters have been venerated by Kosovar Albanian society with the publishing of literature such as biographies, the erection of monuments and commemorative events. The exploits of Adem Jashari have been celebrated and turned into legend by former KLA members and by Kosovar Albanian society. Several songs, literature works, monuments, and memorials have been dedicated to him, and some streets and buildings bear his name across Kosovo.

=== Insurgency in south Serbia and Macedonia ===
After the end of the Kosovo War in 1999 with the signing of the Kumanovo agreement, a 5-kilometre-wide Ground Safety Zone (GSZ) was created. It served as a buffer zone between the Yugoslav Army and the Kosovo Force (KFOR). In June 1999, a new Albanian militant insurgent group was formed under the Liberation Army of Preševo, Medveđa and Bujanovac (UÇPMB), which started training in the GSZ. The group began attacking Serbian civilians and police, which escalated into an insurgency.

With the signing of the Končulj Agreement in May 2001, the former KLA and UÇPMB fighters next moved to western Macedonia where the National Liberation Army (NLA) was established, which fought against the Macedonian government in 2001. Ali Ahmeti organized the NLA from former KLA and UÇPMB fighters from Kosovo, Albanian insurgents from the Liberation Army of Preševo, Medveđa and Bujanovac in Serbia, young Albanian radicals, nationalists from Macedonia, and foreign mercenaries. The acronym was the same as the KLA's in Albanian.

=== KLA veterans in politics ===
A number of KLA figures now play a major role in Kosovar politics.

- Hashim Thaçi, the political head of the KLA, is leader of the Democratic Party of Kosovo (PDK) and served a term as prime minister from January 2008. In 2011, he was identified in leaked Western military intelligence reports as a "big fish" in Kosovan organized crime. He was President of Kosovo since 7 April 2016 until his resignation on 5 November 2020.
- Agim Çeku, the KLA's military chief, became Prime Minister of Kosovo after the war. The move caused some controversy in Serbia.
- Ramush Haradinaj, a KLA commander, is the founder and currently the leader of Alliance for the Future of Kosovo (AAK) and served briefly as Prime Minister of Kosovo. From 2017 to 2020 he was again Prime Minister of Kosovo.
- Fatmir Limaj, a senior commander of the KLA, is now the leader of the Initiative for Kosovo (NISMA).

== Foreign support ==
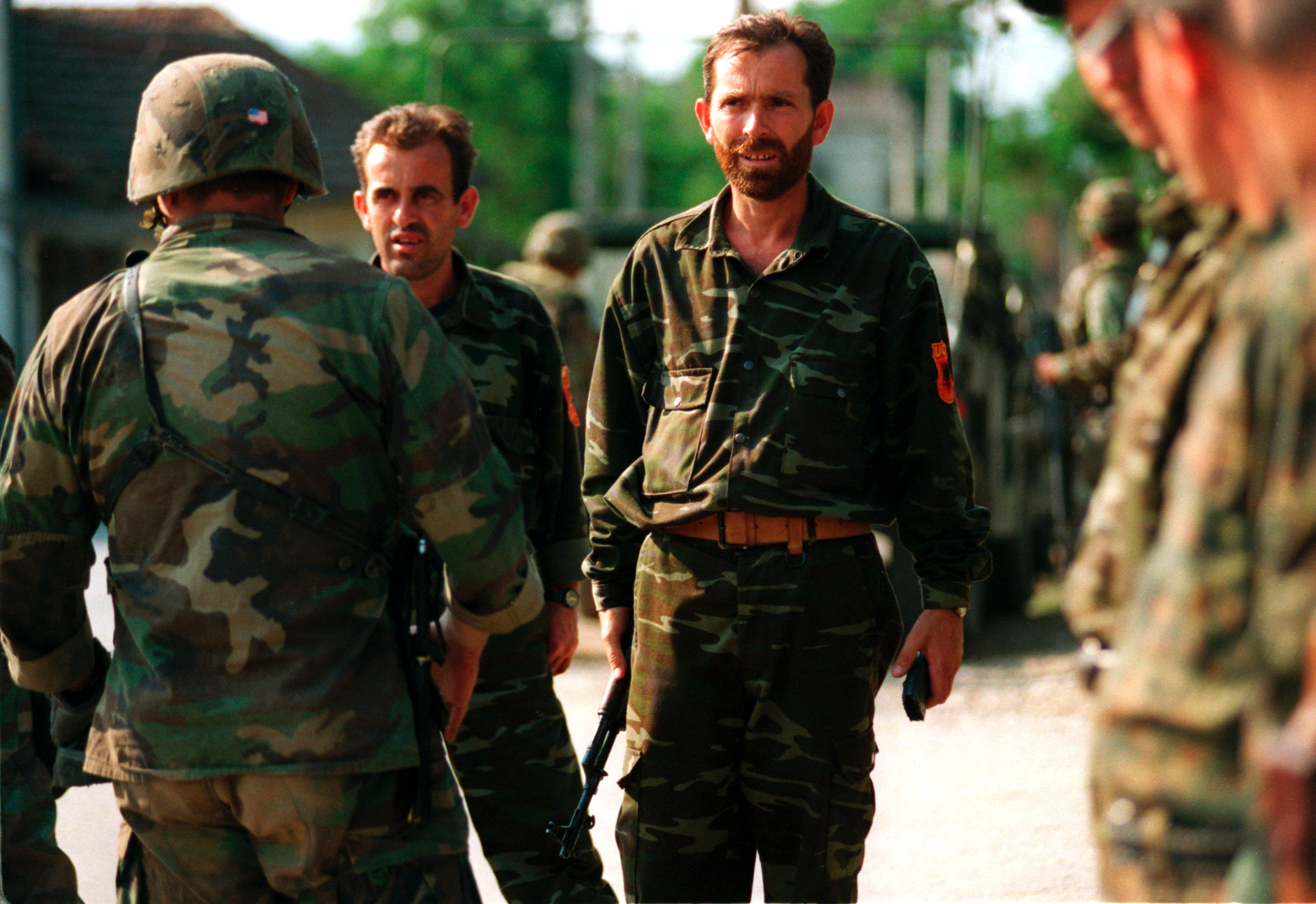
Members of the Kosovo Liberation Army turn over their weapons to U.S. Marines

The United States (and NATO) directly supported the KLA. The CIA funded, trained and supplied the KLA (as they had earlier the Bosnian Army). As disclosed to The Sunday Times by CIA sources, "American intelligence agents have admitted they helped to train the Kosovo Liberation Army before NATO's bombing of Yugoslavia".

James Bissett, Canadian Ambassador to Yugoslavia, Bulgaria and Albania, wrote in 2001 on the Toronto Star that media reports indicate that "as early as 1998, the Central Intelligence Agency assisted by the British Special Air Service were arming and training Kosovo Liberation Army members in Albania to foment armed rebellion in Kosovo. (...) The hope was that with Kosovo in flames NATO could intervene ...". According to Tim Judah, KLA representatives had already met with American, British, and Swiss intelligence agencies in 1996, and possibly "several years earlier".

American Republican Congressman Dana Rohrabacher, while opposed to American ground troops in Kosovo, advocated for America providing support to the KLA to help them gain their freedom. He was honored by the Albanian American Civic League at a New Jersey located fundraising event on 23 July 2001. President of the League, Joseph J. DioGuardi, praised Rohrabacher for his support to the KLA, saying "He was the first member of Congress to insist that the United States arm the Kosovo Liberation Army, and one of the few members who to this day publicly supports the independence of Kosovo." Rohrabacher gave a speech in support of American equipping the KLA with weaponry, comparing it to French support of America in the Revolutionary War.

== Status as a terrorist group ==
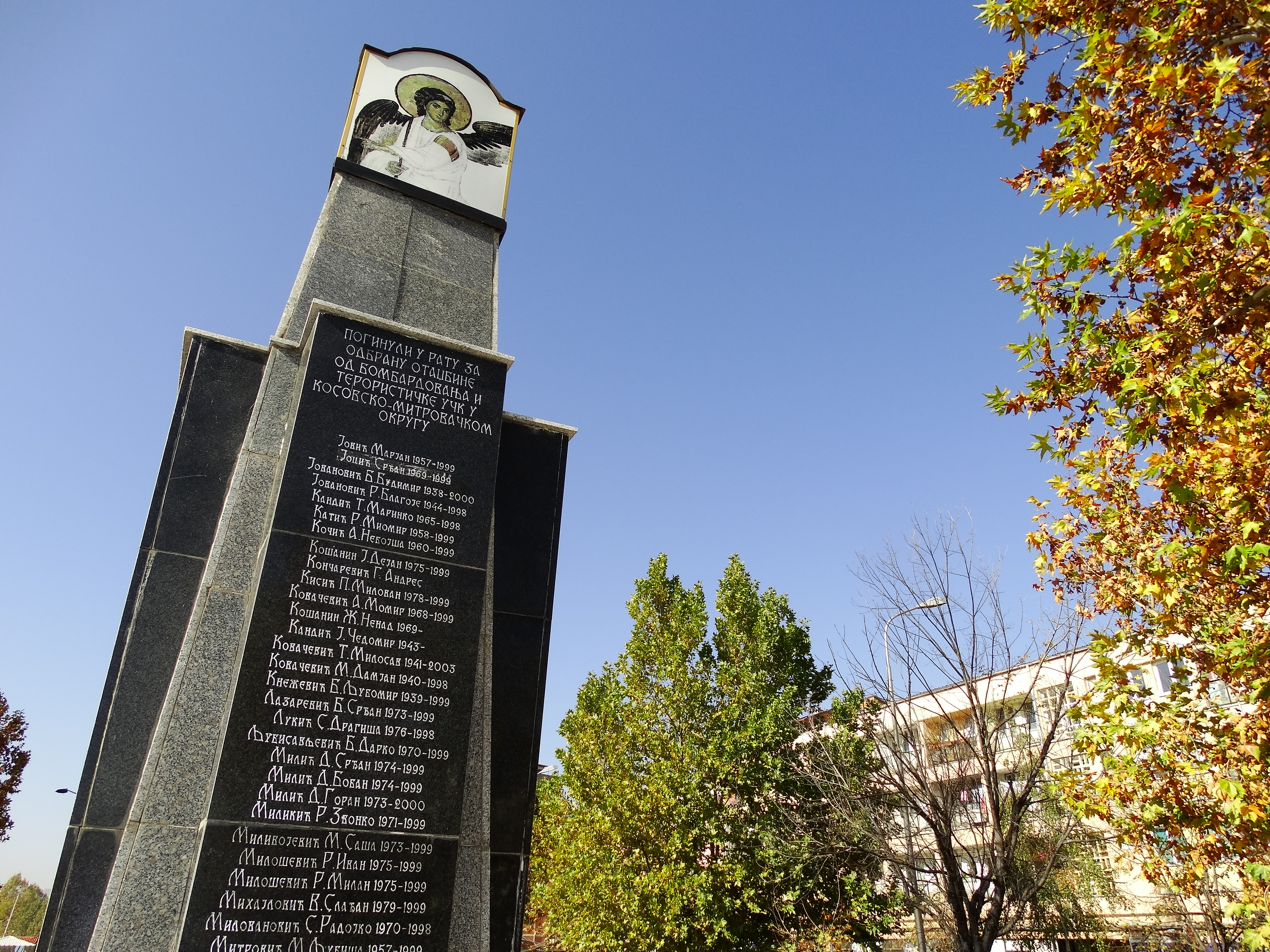
Monument to Serbs killed by KLA in Mitrovica

The Yugoslav authorities, under Slobodan Milošević, regarded the KLA as terrorist group. In February 1998, U.S. President Bill Clinton's special envoy to the Balkans, Robert Gelbard, condemned both the actions of the Serb government and of the KLA, and described the KLA as "without any questions, a terrorist group". UN resolution 1160 took a similar stance. Per Interpol and Osama bin Laden's biographer Yossef Bodansky, Muhammad al-Zawahiri, brother of the Egyptian physician Ayman al-Zawahiri, the number two of Osama bin Laden, was the director of the group's elite services. Per professor of peace and conflict studies Alpaslan Özerdem, it was considered a terrorist group by the international community until the breakup of Yugoslavia.

Allegedly the 1997 U.S. State Department's official list of "Foreign Terrorist Organizations" did not include the KLA but the U.S. State Department might have listed it as a terrorist organization in 1998 presumably by the fact that it was financing its operations with money from the international heroin trade and loans from Islamic countries. In March 1998, just one month later Gerbald had to modify his statements to say that KLA had not been classified legally by the U.S. government as a terrorist group, and the U.S. government approached the KLA leaders to make them interlocutors with the Serbs. The Wall Street Journal claimed later that the U.S. government had in February 1998 removed the KLA from the list of terrorist organisations, a removal that has never been confirmed. France delisted the KLA in late 1998, after strong U.S. and UK lobbying. KLA is still present in the MIPT Terrorism Knowledge Base list of terrorist groups, and is listed as an inactive terrorist organisation by the National Consortium for the Study of Terrorism and Responses to Terrorism.

During the war, the KLA troops collaborated with the NATO troops, and one of its members was called by NATO the embodiment of the Kosovo "freedom fighters". In late 1999 the KLA was disbanded and its members entered the Kosovo Protection Corps. Most states which faced international activity by the KLA on their territory never officially designated it as a terrorist organization.

== War crimes ==
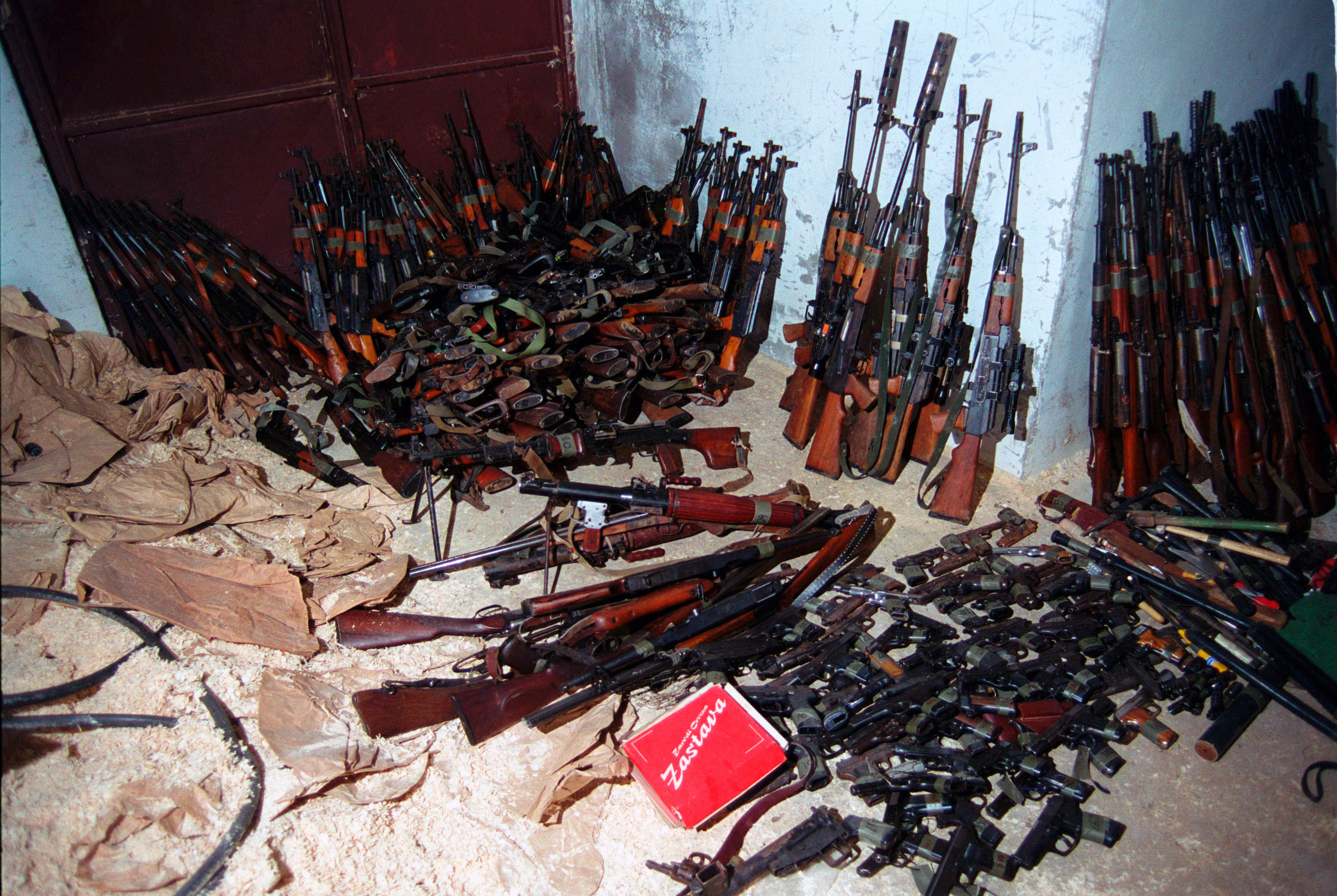
Weapons confiscated from the KLA, July 1999

There have been reports of war crimes committed by the KLA both during and after the conflict. These have been directed against Serbs, other ethnic minorities (primarily the Roma) and against ethnic Albanians accused of collaborating with Serb authorities. According to a 2001 report by Human Rights Watch (HRW) which mainly covered "war crimes committed by Serbian and Yugoslav government forces against Kosovar Albanians" :

The KLA was responsible for serious abuses in 1998... including abductions and murders of Serbs and ethnic Albanians considered collaborators with the state. Elements of the KLA are also responsible for post-conflict attacks on Serbs, Roma, and other non-Albanians, as well as ethnic Albanian political rivals... Immediately following NATO's arrival in Kosovo, there was widespread and systematic burning and looting of homes belonging to Serbs, Roma, and other minorities and the destruction of Orthodox churches and monasteries... combined with harassment and intimidation designed to force people from their homes and communities... elements of the KLA are clearly responsible for many of these crimes.

According to a U.S. Council on Foreign Relations report, prior to the late 1990s, the KLA engaged in tit-for-tat attacks against Serbs in Kosovo, reprisals against ethnic Albanians who "collaborated" with the Serbian government, and bombed police stations and cafes known to be frequented by Serb officials, killing innocent civilians in the process. Most of its activities were funded by drug running, though its ties to community groups and Albanian exiles gave it local popularity.

The Panda Bar incident, a massacre of Serb teenagers in a café, led to an immediate crackdown on the Albanian-populated southern quarters of Peć during which Serbian police killed two Albanians. Aleksandar Vučić has stated that there is no evidence that the murder was committed by Albanians, as previously believed. The Serbian Organised Crime Prosecutor's Office launched a new investigation in 2016 and reached the conclusion that the massacre was not perpetrated by Albanians.

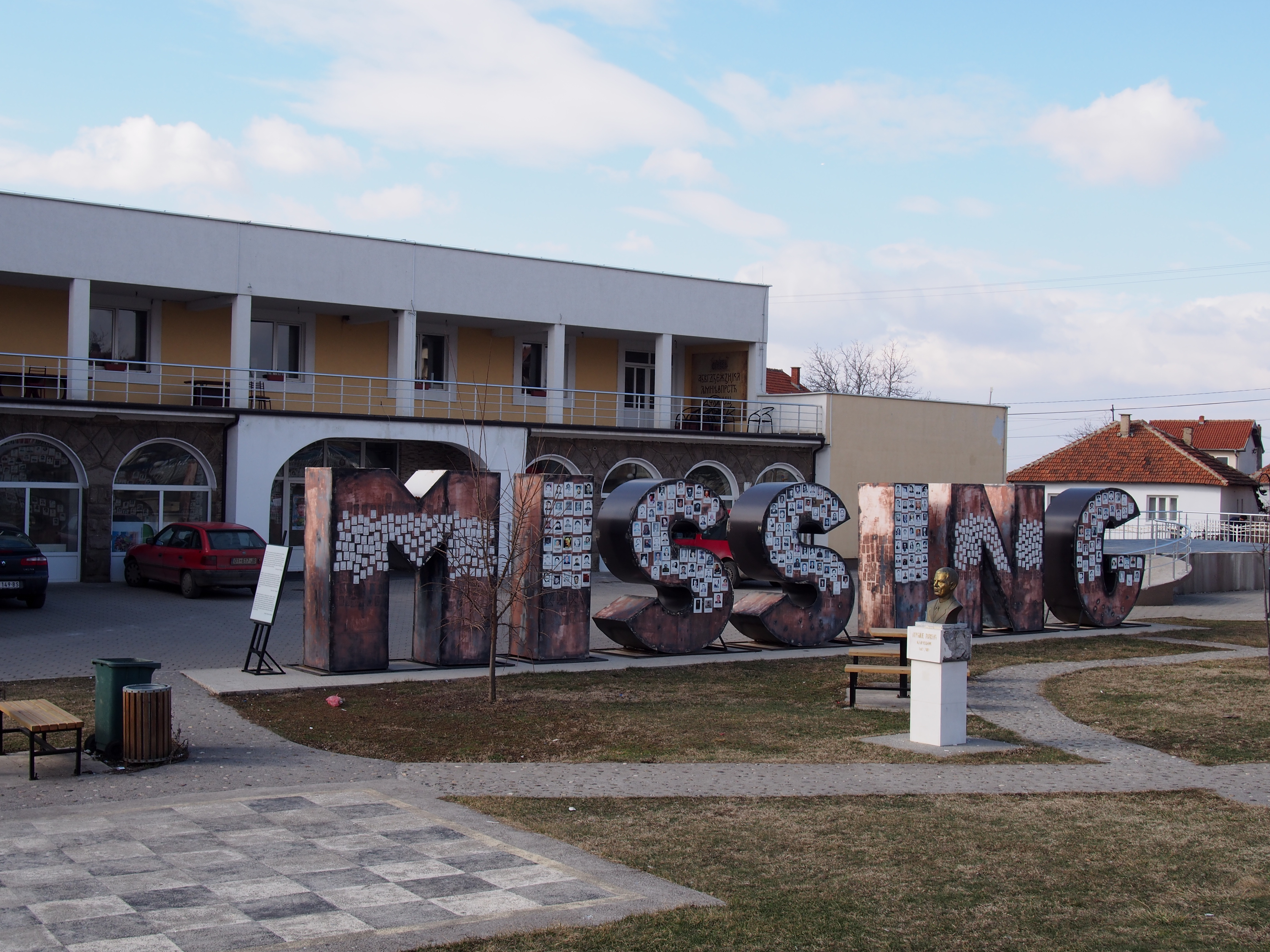
The "Missing" monument in Gračanica dedicated for the Serb victims missing from the Kosovo War

The exact number of victims of the KLA is not known. Human Rights Watch, citing the International Committee of the Red Cross, stated that 97 Serbs were missing as of 1998. According to a Serbian government report, from 1 January 1998 to 10 June 1999 the KLA killed 988 people and kidnapped 287; 335 were civilians, 351 soldiers, 230 police and 72 were unidentified. By nationality, 87 of the killed civilians were Serbs, 230 Albanians, and 18 of other nationalities. In the period from 10 June 1999 to 11 November 2001, when NATO took control in Kosovo, 847 were reported to have been killed and 1,154 kidnapped, the vast majority Serb civilians. According to Human Rights Watch in 2001, as "many as one thousand Serbs and Roma have been murdered or have gone missing since 12 June 1999... elements of the KLA are clearly responsible for many of these crimes".

A Serbian court sentenced 9 former KLA members for murdering 32 non-Albanian civilians. In the same case, another 35 civilians are missing while 153 were tortured and released.

=== Use of child soldiers ===
The Convention on the Rights of the Child, adopted by the UN General Assembly on 20 November 1989, entered into force on 2 September 1990 and was valid throughout the conflict. Article 38 of this Convention state the age of 15 as the minimum for recruitment or participation in armed conflict. Article 38 requires state parties to prevent anyone under the age of 15 from taking direct part in hostilities and to refrain from recruiting anyone under the age of 15 years.

The participation of persons under the age of 18 in the KLA was confirmed in October 2000 when details of the registration of 16,024 KLA soldiers by the International Organization for Migration in Kosovo became known. Ten percent of this number were under the age of 18. The majority of them were 16 and 17 years old. Around 2% were below the age of 16. These were mainly girls recruited to cook for the soldiers rather than to actually fight.

=== Organ theft allegations ===
Carla Del Ponte, a long-time ICTY chief prosecutor, claimed in her book The Hunt: Me and the War Criminals (2008) that there were instances of organ trafficking in 1999 after the end of the Kosovo War. The allegations have been rejected by Kosovar authorities as fabrications while the ICTY has said "no reliable evidence had been obtained to substantiate the allegations". In early 2011 the European Parliament's Committee on Foreign Affairs viewed a report by Dick Marty on the alleged criminal activities and alleged organ harvesting controversy; however, the Members of Parliament criticised the report, citing lack of evidence, and Marty responded that a witness protection program was needed in Kosovo before he could provide more details on witnesses because their lives were in danger.

In 2011, France 24 obtained a classified document which dated back to 2003 and revealed that the UN knew about the organ trafficking before it was mentioned by Carla del Ponte in 2008.

In July 2014, American attorney Clint Williamson, the former United States Ambassador-at-Large for War Crimes Issues, announced that he and his team had found "compelling indications" that approximately 10 prisoners had been killed so their organs could be harvested. "The fact that it occurred on a limited scale does not diminish the savagery of such a crime," Williamson said, but added that the level of evidence was insufficient to file charges against any particular individual.

=== Massacres ===
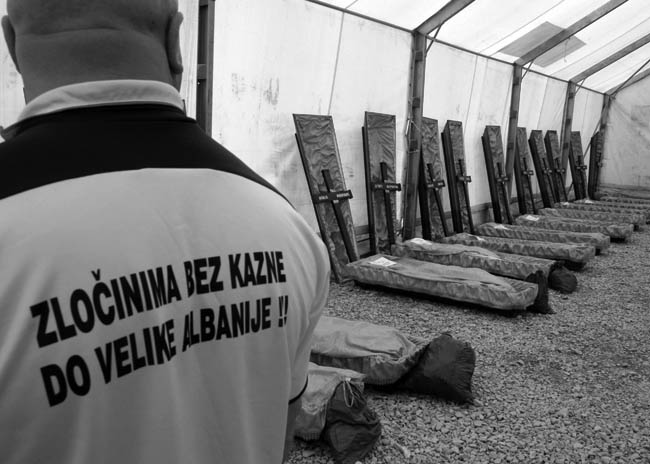
Serbian victims during insurgency

- Klečka killings (26–27 August 1998) – 22 burnt bodies were alleged by Serbia to be found in a makeshift crematorium; Serbia has attributed the killings to the KLA. Human Rights Watch has been unable to confirm the allegations, noting that the manner in which the claims were presented raised serious questions about their validity. In April 2001, Luan Mazreku and Bekim Mazreku were convicted by a Serbian court in Niš on charges of terrorism and sentenced to 20 years' imprisonment in what was described as a highly biased trial by the Humanitarian Law Center (HLC) in Belgrade, with the suspects being subjected to abuse by Serbian police and judicial authorities intended to force confessions. They were eventually released after the fall of the Milošević regime and returned to Kosovo along with other prisoners, according to the UN Mission in Kosovo.
- Lake Radonjić massacre (9 September 1998) – 34 individuals of Serb, Roma and Albanian ethnicity were discovered by a Serbian forensic team near the lake. Serbia has attributed the killing to the KLA and other Kosovan militants.
- Mališevo mass grave - After being kidnapped and held in detention by the KLA, 12 Serbs and 1 Bulgarian civilian were massacred with their remains discovered in a mass grave in the town of Malisheva.
- Gnjilane killings – The remains of 80 Serbs were discovered after they were killed, allegedly by members of the KLA's Gnjilane Group, who were tried in absentia by a Serbian court and found guilty. A mass grave was found in Čena(r) Česma near Gjilan.
- Orahovac massacre – More than 100 Serbian and Roma civilians from Rahovec and its surrounding villages - Retimlje, Opterusa, Zočište and Velika Hoca - in western Kosovo were kidnapped and placed in prison camps by KLA fighters; 47 were killed and their grave found in 2005.
- Staro Gracko massacre – 14 Serbian farmers were murdered. Perpetrators were never found.
- Ugljare mass grave – 15 bodies of Serbs found in a mass grave, reported on 25 August 1999 by KFOR. The KFOR exhumed the mass grave on 27 July. 14 Serbs had been shot, stabbed or clubbed. Ugljare was a KLA stronghold.
- Volujak massacre – According to Serb authorities, 25 male Kosovo Serb civilians were murdered. Serbia attributes the killings to the KLA "Orahovac group".

In 2003, the daily Serbian newspaper Večernje novosti published wartime photographs of three KLA soldiers with the heads of decapitated Serbs. The newspaper identified two of the three KLA members as Sadik Chuflaj and his son Valon Chuflaj, who according to the newspaper then worked for the Kosovo Protection Corps. Bojan Cvetkovic, a volunteer soldier who had been only on duty for weeks was identified as one of the victims while the Serbian Radical Party later confirmed that soldier Aleksandar Njegovic who was a SRP member, was the second victim out of three other soldiers that went missing at the same time.

=== Destroyed medieval churches and monuments ===
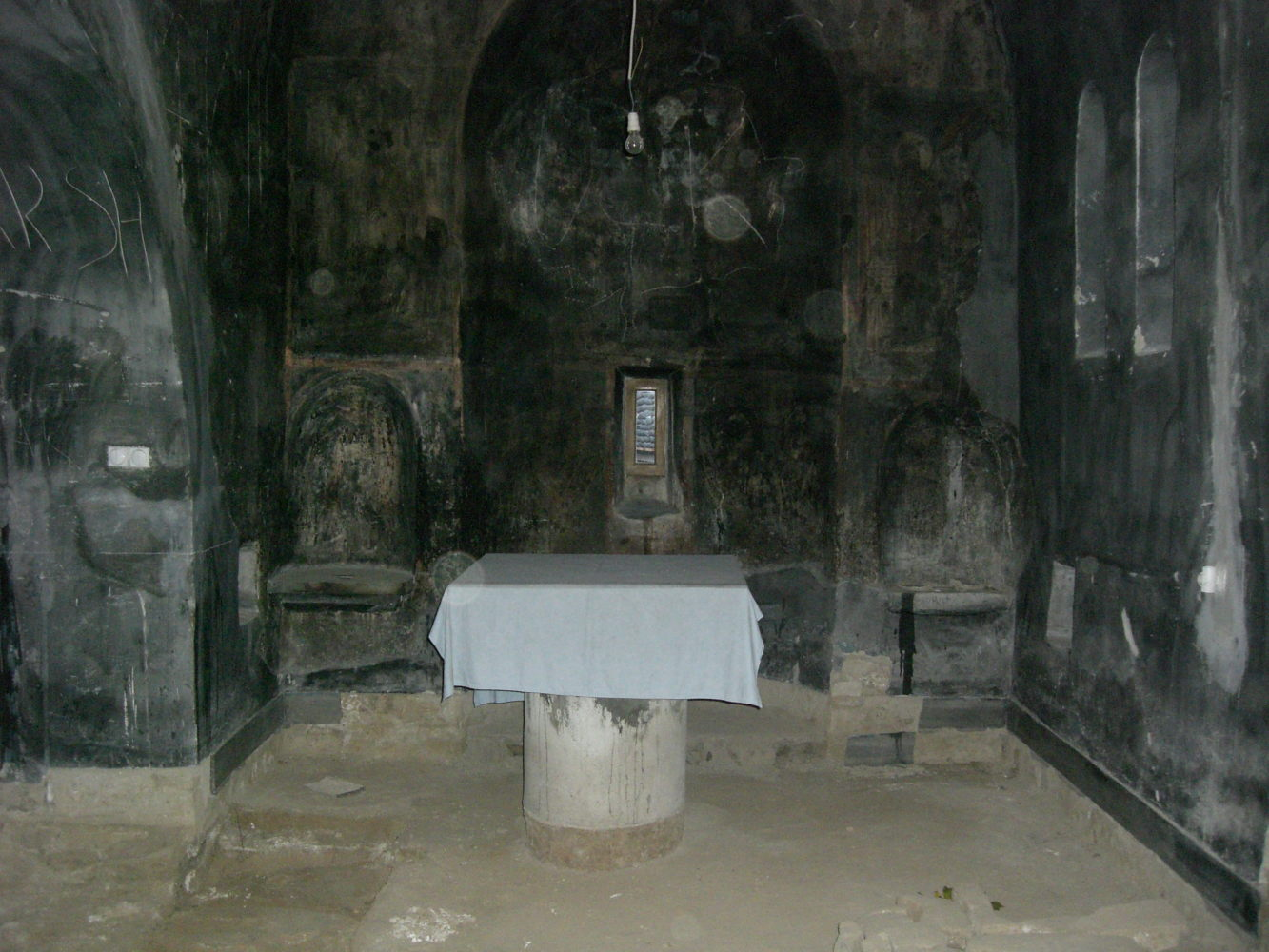
"UÇK" (KLA) graffiti in damaged Devič, medieval Serbian Orthodox monastery

Cultural historian András Riedlmayer stated that no Serbian Orthodox churches or monasteries were damaged or destroyed by the KLA during the war. Riedlmayer and Andrew Herscher conducted a survey of Kosovo cultural heritage for the ICTY and UNMIK following the war and their results found that most of the damage to the churches occurred during revenge attacks following the conflict and the return of Kosovo Albanian refugees. In 1999 KLA fighters were accused of vandalizing Devič monastery and terrorizing the staff. The KFOR troops said KLA rebels vandalized centuries-old murals and paintings in the chapel and stole two cars and all the monastery's food.

Karima Bennoune, United Nations special rapporteur in the field of cultural rights, referred to the many reports of widespread attacks against churches committed by the Kosovo Liberation Army. In 2014, John Clint Williamson announced EU Special Investigative Task Force's investigative findings and he indicated that a certain element of the KLA following the conclusion of the war (June 1999) intentionally targeted minority populations in organized ethnic cleansing campaign with acts of persecution that also included desecration and destruction of churches and other religious sites. Fabio Maniscalco, an Italian archaeologist, specialist about the protection of cultural property, described that KLA members seized icons and liturgical ornaments as they ransacked and that they proceeded to destroy Christian Orthodox churches and monasteries with mortar bombs after the arrival of KFOR.

=== Prison camps ===
- Lapušnik prison camp – Haradin Bala, a KLA prison guard, was found guilty by the ICTY of torture and mistreatment of prisoners crimes committed at the camp.
- Jablanica prison camp – 10 individuals were detained and tortured by KLA forces including: one Serb, three Montenegrins, one Bosnian, three Albanians, and two victims of unknown ethnicity.

Several survivors of KLA run prison camps in Albania have come forward to tell their stories of being kidnapped and transported to these camps where they witnessed the torture and killing of other prisoners. In 2009, eyewitness testimonies from former inmates and KLA fighters described the detention of Albanian, Roma and Serb civilians from the area of Prizren in KLA run prison camps in the Albanian town of Kukës. Despite the prison camp initially being set up, with assistance from the Albanian army, to detain unruly KLA fighters, acts of torture and extrajudicial killings were committed by the KLA against Albanian, Roma, and Serb civilians. According to one former KLA fighter:

It didn't seem strange at the time...but now, looking back, I know that some of the things that were done to innocent civilians were wrong. But the people who did those things act as if nothing happened, and continue to hurt their own people, Albanians.

=== Sexual violence ===
Since the entry of the NATO-led Kosovo Force, rapes of Serb and Romani, as well as Albanian women perceived as collaborators, by ethnic Albanians and sometimes by KLA members have been documented.

== Investigations for war crimes ==
=== Investigations ===
In 2010, a report by the Council of Europe accused KLA guerrillas of killing civilian Serbs and ethnic Albanian political opponents. Based on the Council of Europe report, the Special Investigative Task Force (SITF) was created in 2011 to investigate the allegations. The SITF chief prosecutor presented his general findings in 2014 resulting in the creation of the specialist chambers in The Hague to adjudicate the cases.

In April 2014, the Assembly of Kosovo considered and approved the establishment of a special court of Kosovo to try alleged war crimes and other serious abuses committed during and after the 1998–99 Kosovo war. The court will adjudicate cases against individuals based on a 2010 Council of Europe report by the Swiss senator Dick Marty. The proceedings will be EU-funded and held in The Hague, though it would still be a Kosovo national court. Defendants will likely include members of the Kosovo Liberation Army who are alleged to have committed crimes against ethnic minorities and political opponents, meaning the court is likely to meet with some unpopularity at home, where the KLA are still widely considered heroes.

In December 2020, the Parliament of Albania decided to create a committee in order to investigate the accusations against KLA of human rights violations in both Kosovo and north Albania where it had bases. Prime Minister Edi Rama accused the opposition chief Lulzim Basha of helping the UN to investigate the KLA and called him a traitor. Basha denied the accusations.

In 2020, Serbian authorities arrested Nezir Mehmetaj at the Merdare. He is accused of participating in war crimes against civilians including murders and burning and looting of private properties in the village of Rudice at Klina during the war. He denied the accusations.

In March 2021, Belgian authorities arrested Pjeter Shala, a former KLA commander on war crimes charges.

In May 2022, more charges were added for war crimes allegedly committed in 1998 and 1999 by KLA members at the dormitories in Budakove and Semetishte. According to the final indictment, most of the crimes committed at detention centres in Kosovo and Albania.

=== Trials ===
Haradin Bala, an ex-KLA prison guard, was sentenced on 30 November 2005 to 13 years' imprisonment for the mistreatment of three prisoners at the Lapušnik prison camp, his personal role in the "maintenance and enforcement of the inhumane conditions" of the camp, aiding the torture of one prisoner, and of participating in the murder of nine prisoners from the camp who were marched to the Berisha Mountains on 25 or 26 July 1998 and killed. He was granted early release in 2013.

Haridinaj, former commander Idriz Balaj, and deputy commander Lahi Brahimaj were indicted by the ICTY on 4 March 2005 as part of a joint criminal enterprise related to alleged crimes committed against Kosovo Serb, Albanian, Roma and other civilians in a compound of the KLA in the village of Jablanica, including cruel treatment, torture and murder. The judgement in the trial in 2008 acquitted Haradinaj and Balaj and dismissed charges of a criminal criminal enterprise, however Brahimaj was found guilty of one count of torture and another count of torture and cruel treatment and sentenced to six years. In July 2010, the Appeals Chamber partially quashed the acquittals and ordered the re-trial of all three, resulting in their acquittals in 2010. Limaj was also acquitted of war crime charges by the Hague in his trial, related to abuses which occurred at the Lapušnik prison camp. The court noted that there were difficulties because many witnesses were fearful of giving testimonies, while others changed their testimonies and some died in mysterious circumstances. In addition, there were convictions for witness-tampering regarding these two cases. Limaj was also implicated in the Klecka case by the European Union Rule of Law Mission in Kosovo (EULEX), where it is alleged Serb and Albanian prisoners were subjected to inhumane conditions and beatings; seven Serbs and one Albanian was killed by subordinates under his command. Limaj was acquitted in May 2012 along with three of his aides. A re-trial was ordered and he was subsequently acquitted again in May 2017.

In 2015, ten members of the KLA, including Sylejman Selimi who was ex-head of the Kosovo Security Force and later ambassador to Albania, were convicted for war crimes against civilians by the Mitrovica Basic Court. Selimi was initially sentenced for eight years, but the Appeals Court in Pristina reduced his sentence to seven years in 2016. The convictions were upheld in 2017 by the Supreme Court of Kosovo. In 2024, the Pristina Basic Court cleared Syleman Selimi and Jahir Demaku of the charge of beating up a prisoner in Likovac.

On 24 June 2020, the Kosovo Specialist Chambers and Specialist Prosecutor's Office filed a ten-count Indictment, charging Kosovo President Hashim Thaçi, Kadri Veseli and others for crimes against humanity and war crimes. The indictment charges the suspects with approximately 100 murders of Kosovo Albanians, Kosovo Serbs, Kosovo Roma, and political opponents. The prosecutors said that Hashim Thaci and Kadri Veseli repeatedly tried to obstruct and undermine the work of the KSC (Special Court of Kosovo), "in an attempt to ensure that they do not face justice". In July 2020, Thaçi was questioned by war crimes prosecutors at The Hague.

In September 2020, Agim Çeku was summoned by the prosecutors as a war crimes suspect. The same month, the former KLA commander Salih Mustafa was arrested and transferred to the detention facilities in The Hague, based on a "warrant, transfer order and confirmed indictment issued by a pre-trial judge". Mustafa was charged with the war crimes of arbitrary detention, cruel treatment, torture and murder. The same month, Hysni Gucati (Chairman of the Kosovo Liberation Army War Veterans Association) and Nasim Haradinaj (Deputy Chairman of the Kosovo Liberation Army War Veterans Association) were also arrested and transferred to the Kosovo Specialist Chambers's Detention Unit. They were charged for obstructing Special Court of Kosovo officials in performing their duties, intimidation during criminal proceedings, retaliation and violating secrecy of proceedings.

In November 2020, Thaci, a deputy in the Kosovo parliament, Rexhep Selimi, the president of Thaci's Kosovo Democratic Party, Kadri Veseli, and veteran Kosovo politician Jakup Krasniqi were arrested and transferred to the detention center of the Kosovo Tribunal in The Hague on charges of war crimes and crimes against humanity.

In February 2021, the president of the Kosovo Specialist Chambers, Ekaterina Trendafilova, informed the European diplomats that there were increasing efforts from Kosovo to undermine the court's work and warned about the safety of the witnesses. She mentioned that there were attempts to challenge the law and to pardon those convicted of crimes. In addition she said that Kosovo is trying hard to move the court from Hague to Pristina (capital of Kosovo) and such a move would "risk the lives, safety and security of the people who have or will be willing to cooperate with the court".

The United States Country Reports on Human Rights Practices of 2021 reported that "leading politicians, civil society leaders and veterans organisations" in Kosovo were trying to undermine the Hague court.

In December 2022 Salih Mustafa, who had been arrested in September 2020, was convicted in The Hague of the war crimes of arbitrary detention, torture, and murder, but not convicted of cruel treatment for legal reasons. He was sentenced to 26 years in prison. The Trial Panel also mentioned that the victims and witnesses had shown tremendous courage cooperating with the Specialist Chambers and the Specialist Prosecutor, because they were subjected to threats and intimidation in Kosovo for their cooperation.

Kosovo provides help to former KLA members but does not support the victims of war crimes, despite the Chambers' requests. Thaçi, Veseli, Krasniqi and Selimi were found guilty of war crimes and given prison sentences by the court on 16 September 2026.

== Major personalities ==
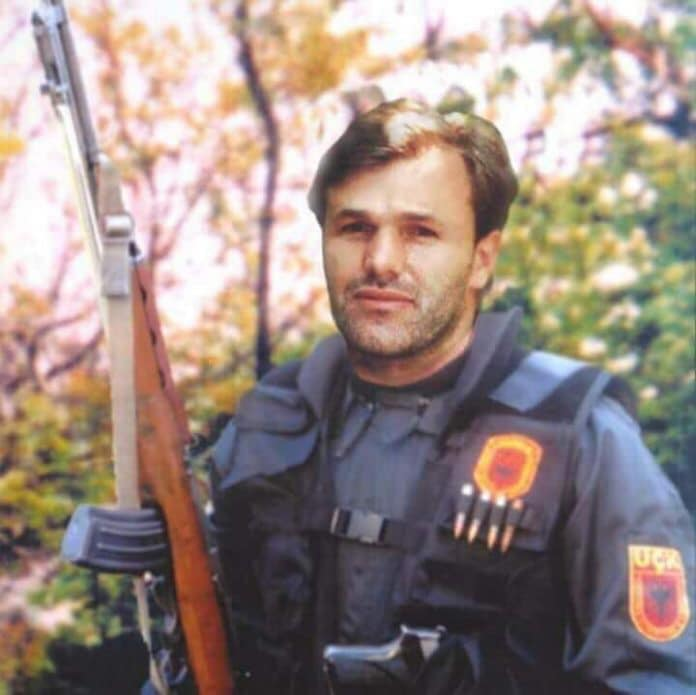
Ilir Lushtaku

- Ismet Jashari (1967–1998), commander from Kumanovo.
- Agim Çelaj (1961–1998), commander from Peja.
- Agim Shala (1975–1998), commander from Prizren.
- Sylejman Sylejmani (1953–2017), commander from Gjakova.
- Abdullah Tahiri (1956–1999), commander, from Gjilan.
- Shemsi Ahmeti (1969–1999), commander, from Mitrovica.
- Ilir Lushtaku (1 April 1971 – 26 March 1998), one of the first soldiers of the KLA, who was killed during the early stages of the war, considered as one of the closest comrades of Adem Jashari. Ilir was a cousin of the Drenica Operational Zone Commander Sami Lushtaku. He was posthumously awarded the Hero of Kosovo.
- Isak Musliu (born 1970), soldier, from Shtime.

== See also ==
- Albanian Armed Forces
- Armed Forces of the Republic of Kosovo
- Kosovo Police
- Military of Kosovo
- Operation Horseshoe
- 1999 NATO bombings of Yugoslavia
- Albanian nationalism in Kosovo
