= Yugoslav offensive near Prizren =

- Part of the Kosovo War
- Monument in Prizren of Xhevat Berisha, who was killed during this offensive
Date	1 September – 5 September 1998
Location	villages south of Prizren, Autonomous Province of Kosovo and Metohija, Federal Republic of Yugoslavia
Result	Yugoslav victory
Territorial changes	Yugoslav forces capture 8 villages south of Prizren

Belligerents
FR Yugoslavia	Kosovo Liberation Army

Commanders and leaders
(Serbia and Montenegro) Veljko Radenović (Serbia and Montenegro) Vlastimir Đorđević (Serbia and Montenegro) Sreten Lukić (Serbia and Montenegro) Gradimir Zekavica (Serbia and Montenegro) Milan Ðuričić	Ekrem Rexha; Nehat Basha; Samidin Xhezairi-Hoxha; Bashkim Suka (WIA); Agim Shala †; Selajdin Berisha †; Xhevat Berisha †

Units involved
Ministry of Internal Affairs; Prizren SUP	Kosovo Liberation Army; Pashtrik Operational Zone; 125th Brigade “Pashtriku”; “Petriti” Special Unit; “Tigrat e Vërrinit” Special Unit; Military Police Unit

Strength
(Serbia and Montenegro) hundreds of policemen (Serbia and Montenegro) up to 30 armoured vehicles	unknown

Casualties and losses
(Serbia and Montenegro) 5 policemen killed	35 killed

The Yugoslav offensive near Prizren was an offensive launched by the Ministry of Internal Affairs (MUP) against the Kosovo Liberation Army (KLA) south of the second biggest city in Kosovo, Prizren, during the Kosovo War. The offensive began on 1 September, ending on 5 September. At the conclusion of the fighting, the MUP disarmed Albanian villagers who were resisting the offensive.

== Background ==
Following World War II, Kosovo was given the status of an autonomous province within the Socialist Republic of Serbia, one of six constitutional republics of the Socialist Federal Republic of Yugoslavia. After the death of Yugoslavia's long-time leader (Josip Broz Tito) in 1980, Yugoslavia's political system began to unravel. In 1989, Belgrade revoked Kosovo's autonomy. Kosovo, a province inhabited predominantly by ethnic Albanians, was of great historical and cultural significance to Serbs, who had formed a majority there before the mid-19th century, but by 1990 represented only about 10 percent of the population. Alarmed by their dwindling numbers, the province's Serbs began to fear that they were being "squeezed out" by the Albanians, and ethnic tensions worsened. As soon as Kosovo's autonomy was abolished, a minority government run by Serbs and Montenegrins was appointed by Serbian President Slobodan Milošević to oversee the province, enforced by thousands of heavily armed paramilitaries from Serbia-proper. Albanian culture was systematically repressed and hundreds of thousands of Albanians working in state-owned companies lost their jobs.

In 1996, a group of Albanian nationalists calling themselves the Kosovo Liberation Army (KLA) began attacking the Yugoslav Army (Serbo-Croatian: Vojska Jugoslavije; VJ) and the Serbian Ministry of Internal Affairs (Serbo-Croatian: Ministarstvo unutrašnjih poslova; MUP) in Kosovo. Their goal was to separate the province from the rest of Yugoslavia, which following the separation of Slovenia, Croatia, Macedonia and Bosnia-Herzegovina in 1991–92, was just a rump federation consisting of Serbia and Montenegro. At first, the KLA carried out hit-and-run attacks (31 in 1996, 55 in 1997, and 66 in January and February 1998 alone). It quickly gained popularity among young Kosovo Albanians, many of whom rejected the non-violent resistance to Yugoslav authorities advocated by the politician Ibrahim Rugova and favoured a more aggressive approach. The organization received a significant boost in 1997, when an armed uprising in neighbouring Albania led to thousands of weapons from the Albanian Army's depots being looted. Many of these weapons ended up in the hands of the KLA. The KLA also received substantial funds from its involvement in the drug trade.

The KLA's popularity skyrocketed after the VJ and MUP attacked the compound of KLA leader Adem Jashari in March 1998, killing him, his closest associates and most of his family. The attack prompted thousands of young Kosovo Albanians to join the ranks of the KLA, fueling the Kosovar uprising that eventually erupted in the spring of 1998.

The villages of Ješkovo, Poslište, Hoča Zagradska, Ljubičevo, Biluša, Lez, Kuštendil, and Leskovac are situated to the south of Prizren. During the Kosovo War, the region, along with the Tusus neighborhood of Prizren, was a KLA stronghold, known as Vërrin in Albanian media. The 125th Brigade of the KLA was operating in the region, under commander Ekrem Rexha. On 7 July, the MUP failed to ambush a KLA unit in Biluša, which led to a firefight, in which the police retreated. Following the firefight, the police launched an operation to retake the villages of Hoča Zagradska and Biluša on 16 July. The fighting lasted for hours, leading to the retreat of the MUP from the area.

Following the battle of Orahovac, the Yugoslav government launched offensives on most of the KLA strongholds and checkpoints. The Yugoslav government retook Orahovac, unblocked the Priština-Peć roadway, and retook the KLA capital of Mališevo. Through August, the government retook villages in the Reka region, Junik, and the villages near Peć and Dečani.

== Offensive ==
On 31 August, the MUP surrounded the region. The following day, at 07:30, explosions and heavy gunfire were reported near the Tusus neighborhood. The MUP sent out 30 armored vehicles to Tusus and regained control, giving an ultimatum for the KLA to surrender their weapons. At 08:00, KLA positions on the adjacent hills were shelled, prompting villagers to flee the area. At around 10:00, policemen approached the KLA position at an area known as Livdahet të Lavdicës. Four militants were killed after a grenade exploded in their trench. An additional six militants were killed during the exchange of fire with the police. At 11:00, gunfire had reportedly intensified in the Tusus area. Clashes broke out in the forest above Kuštendil, resulting in the deaths of three militants. The villages of Kuštendil and Lez fell to the police, after three policemen were wounded. On 2 September, the Democratic League of Kosovo (LDK) based in Prizren reported that Lez was “leveled to the ground” by the police. The fighting continued through the morning, leaving at least five militants wounded in Leskovac. Around 20 militants were killed in and around Ljubičevo and Ješkovo, after they were hit by heavy artillery followed by an attack by the police. Reports emerged of a large number of Albanian civilians held in Yugoslav custody from Prizren and the villages attacked. The fighting had caused around 10,000 to 15,000 refugees to flee their homes, and were living in the surrounding hillsides. On 3 September, fighting continued in the Ješkovo area, at around 16:00, leading to the deaths of commanders Agim Shala and Selajdin Berisha, along with Besim Shala, Xhevat Berisha, Avdi Shala, and Alajdin Berisha. There were sightings of villages being burned and smoke rising from their homes. From 4 to 5 September, the resistance from the KLA, along with villagers, was subsiding. Yugoslav forces had regained control of the villages, and thousands of refugees were displaced. The 125th Brigade of the KLA withdrew to the village of Retimlje, near Orahovac.
