= Battle of Ješkovo =

1999 Kosovo War battle

- Part of the Kosovo War and the security situation in Kosovo after the Rambouillet conference
Date	11 March 1999
Location	Ješkovo and Hoča Zagradska, near Prizren, Autonomous Province of Kosovo and Metohija, Federal Republic of Yugoslavia
Result	Yugoslav victory: Large number of refugees flee Hoča Zagradska to Prizren; KLA unit disperses and flees Ješkovo; OSCE verifiers enter Ješkovo on 12 March; Prizren-Žur roadway is blocked by VJ, later reopened
Territorial changes	FR Yugoslavia captures Ješkovo

Belligerents
FR Yugoslavia	Kosovo Liberation Army

Commanders and leaders
(Serbia and Montenegro) Stojan Konjikovac (Serbia and Montenegro) Božidar Delić (Serbia and Montenegro) Zoran Ðokić (Serbia and Montenegro) Veljko Radenović (Serbia and Montenegro) Vlastimir Đorđević (Serbia and Montenegro) Sreten Lukić (Serbia and Montenegro) Miloš Vojnović	Ekrem Rexha; Hysen Rexhepi †; Nehat Basha; Samidin Xhezairi; Skënder Latifi †; Ymer Shala (MIA); Bashkim Suka †; Sali Veseli

Units involved
Yugoslav Army; Priština Corps; Yugoslav Air Force and Air Defense; Light anti-aircraft artillery and rocket batallion; 549th Prizren Motorized Brigade; 122 mm howitzer platoon; 120 mm mortar platoon; 82 mm mortar unit; 55th Border Battalion; Ministry of Internal Affairs; Prizren SUP; Special Police Units; 5th Company of Prizren; 37th Detachment of Niš	Kosovo Liberation Army; Pashtrik Operational Zone; 125th Brigade “Pashtriku”; Special Unit; Civilian volunteers

Strength
(Serbia and Montenegro) 1,000 soldiers (Serbia and Montenegro) 300 policemen (Serbia and Montenegro) 8 tanks (Serbia and Montenegro) several armored personnel carriers (Serbia and Montenegro) anti-aircraft vehicles (Serbia and Montenegro) artillery support	29 militants 11 civilian volunteers

Casualties and losses
(Serbia and Montenegro) 24 to 27 killed	9 killed, 9 missing

The Battle of Ješkovo (Serbian: битка код Јешкова, romanized: Bitka kod Ješkova; Albanian: Beteja e Jeshkovës) was fought during the Kosovo War between the Ministry of Internal Affairs (MUP) and the Yugoslav Army (VJ) against the Kosovo Liberation Army (KLA). The battle was fought in and around the village of Ješkovo, south of the second-largest city of Kosovo, Prizren. The battle took place on 11 March 1999, 13 days before the NATO bombing of Yugoslavia.

The battle took place during a period of intensified military and police operations throughout Kosovo, starting in late February. During the fighting, a large number of refugees fled their homes in Hoča Zagradska, and went towards Prizren. The area was monitored by the Organization for Security and Co-operation in Europe (OSCE), who administered medical treatment to the refugees. The verifiers were able to enter Ješkovo the following day, discovering the bodies of fallen KLA militants.

== Background ==
Following World War II, Kosovo was given the status of an autonomous province within the Socialist Republic of Serbia, one of six constitutional republics of the Socialist Federal Republic of Yugoslavia. After the death of Yugoslavia's long-time leader (Josip Broz Tito) in 1980, Yugoslavia's political system began to unravel. In 1989, Belgrade revoked Kosovo's autonomy. Kosovo, a province inhabited predominantly by ethnic Albanians, was of great historical and cultural significance to Serbs, who had formed a majority there before the mid-19th century, but by 1990 represented only about 10 percent of the population. Alarmed by their dwindling numbers, the province's Serbs began to fear that they were being "squeezed out" by the Albanians, and ethnic tensions worsened. As soon as Kosovo's autonomy was abolished, a minority government run by Serbs and Montenegrins was appointed by Serbian President Slobodan Milošević to oversee the province, enforced by thousands of heavily armed paramilitaries from Serbia-proper. Albanian culture was systematically repressed and hundreds of thousands of Albanians working in state-owned companies lost their jobs.

In 1996, a group of Albanian nationalists calling themselves the Kosovo Liberation Army (KLA) began attacking the Yugoslav Army (Serbo-Croatian: Vojska Jugoslavije; VJ) and the Serbian Ministry of Internal Affairs (Serbo-Croatian: Ministarstvo unutrašnjih poslova; MUP) in Kosovo. Their goal was to separate the province from the rest of Yugoslavia, which following the separation of Slovenia, Croatia, Macedonia and Bosnia-Herzegovina in 1991–92, was just a rump federation consisting of Serbia and Montenegro. At first, the KLA carried out hit-and-run attacks (31 in 1996, 55 in 1997, and 66 in January and February 1998 alone). It quickly gained popularity among young Kosovo Albanians, many of whom rejected the non-violent resistance to Yugoslav authorities advocated by the politician Ibrahim Rugova and favoured a more aggressive approach. The organization received a significant boost in 1997, when an armed uprising in neighbouring Albania led to thousands of weapons from the Albanian Army's depots being looted. Many of these weapons ended up in the hands of the KLA. The KLA also received substantial funds from its involvement in the drug trade.

The KLA's popularity skyrocketed after the VJ and MUP attacked the compound of KLA leader Adem Jashari in March 1998, killing him, his closest associates and most of his family. The attack prompted thousands of young Kosovo Albanians to join the ranks of the KLA, fueling the Kosovar uprising that eventually erupted in the spring of 1998.

== Prelude ==
Ješkovo is a village in southern Kosovo, situated to the south of Prizren and north of Dragash. According to the 1981 census, over 90% of the residents of Ješkovo were ethnic Albanians. The KLA favored fighting in villages where they enjoyed strong support of locals. The area between the Prizren-Žur road and the Opolje region was known as the Vërrin/Vrinje region. In 1998, Ješkovo had only one road leading to it, and was surrounded by mountains on all sides. This environment was suitable for the KLA, which would make it more accessible to conduct guerrilla warfare and to defend the village itself.

On 1 September, the Ministry of Internal Affairs (MUP) began an offensive on the region, which led to the capture of the KLA stronghold by 5 September. On 23 September, United Nations Security Council Resolution 1199 was adopted, calling for a ceasefire and the cessation of hostilities. On 16 October, an agreement was signed in Belgrade between the Federal Republic of Yugoslavia and the Organization for Security and Co-operation in Europe providing for the establishment of the Kosovo Verification Mission, with aerial verification over Kosovo agreed the previous day. On 25 October, the OSCE established the Kosovo Verification Mission. Five days later, on 30 October, Operation Eagle Eye was launched, with 1,400 ground observers and 80 aircraft monitoring the situation in Kosovo. In early December, the ceasefire collapsed after a border ambush, and hostilities resumed. On 6 February 1999, the Rambouillet conference began, and on 23 February, the Rambouillet agreement was drafted.

After the offensive in September 1998, the 125th Brigade of the KLA retreated to Retimlje. They formed the special unit in February 1999. The unit, numbering 29 members, was tasked with setting up a base in Ješkovo, training militants, and renewing KLA activity in the region. Hysen Rexhepi was appointed as the commander of the unit. He was assisted by chief of staff Samidin Xhezairi, along with other squad leaders including Bashkim Suka. Each member reportedly carried a dozen grenades, and the unit operated in the Orahovac area. Initial reports stated that the unit originated from Albania, and crossed the border. A separate unit of the KLA operating in the village of Kabaš, planned to infiltrate the village of Koriša and form a village staff there. The KLA was planning to block the Prizren-Suva Reka roadway, and to place the Koriša-Ljutoglava section under their control to advance towards Prizren. By then, the village was largely destroyed, and only four families remained. On 3 March, they left for Ješkovo. On 4 March, they arrived and established a base, where they trained 11 civilian volunteers throughout villages in Vrinje. Upon their arrival, they ordered the four families residing in the village to the evacuate. In total, the unit numbered 40 members, dressed in black uniforms, and were armed with machine guns and mortars. Another 30-man group from Retimlje began preparations to advance to Ješkovo, but ultimately never arrived. On 7 March, three separate shooting incidents were reported in the vicinity of Žur. The following day, the KLA attacked the VJ in Žur, leading to a buildup of troops in the area.

== Battle ==
On 11 March, 1999, the Ministry of Internal Affairs and the Yugoslav Army launched an operation to retake Ješkovo. The PJP was involved in the operation. Yugoslav security forces were deployed in the surrounding villages, with Hoča Zagradska serving as the main operational centre. After several hours of climbing, the security forces had taken up positions on the hills surrounding the village. They maneuvered through Biluša along the Hočica river, and from the east through Ljubičevo. The Yugoslav security forces intended to form a cordon around the village. During the climb, the security forces encountered deserted trenches and boot prints, indicating that it was only a matter of time before they encountered the KLA. The Yugoslav forces were at an altitude of 1,176 meters, while the village of Ješkovo and the KLA headquarters were located 600 meters below. At that time, the equipment of the Yugoslav Army entered Hoča Zagradska. Approximately 8 tanks, armored personnel carriers, artillery, and mortars were utilized by the Yugoslav forces. By 08:00, the cordon was closed; the KLA were surrounded by the security forces.

Approximately one kilometre away from the outskirts of the village, a group of militants fired towards the direction of an advancing Yugoslav squad. The Yugoslav squad managed to spot the militants as they were retreating, about 400 metres away. Another clash occurred along a stream, in which the KLA ambushed an advancing Yugoslav squad. At a distance of 30 metres, two militants fired at the squad. The security forces fired back in the direction of the militants, who were not spotted as they maneuvered into the stream. When the militants were spotted, they were fired upon. Both militants were killed, one of them bearing a machine gun. Lieutenant Colonel Konjikovac, along with ten members of the military police, approached 300 meters from the position of the militants, who had not yet noticed the presence of the security forces. Other soldiers and policemen descended from the hill 200 meters from the village. At 12:30, 120 and 82mm mortars near Hoča Zagradska began to fire at Ješkovo. The security forces began to close in and attack the village. Members of the KLA split up into multiple groups, each numbering 5 to 6 men, in an attempt to contest the cordon. The fighting was at a distance of 10 to 15 metres, which included house-to-house combat. A militant from one of the houses threw a grenade that wounded three policemen.

Some of the KLA militants tried to escape through a knee-deep mountain stream, using the extraction system they had practiced beforehand. However, at the place where the stream made a bend, they were ambushed by Yugoslav machine gunners. Several militants attempted to break out of the ambush by turning and running uphill. Although they were well prepared, they were shot by the advancing policemen. According to a Yugoslav claim, one militant hid among the dead, pretending to have been shot. When the policemen began to turn over the corpses, he drew his rifle, but a policeman was more vigilant and shot him first. A KLA member who was on further security saw an Organization for Security and Co-operation in Europe (OSCE) vehicle in Hoča Zagradska and went towards it with the intention of getting out of the village with the verifiers. However, a police patrol arrested him. In the evening, a column of Yugoslav armored vehicles arrived at the village, re-establishing control over the surrounding area.

== Aftermath ==
The next day, 12 March, the Yugoslav column left the village in the morning, and two OSCE jeeps carrying verifiers accompanied by two police vehicles entered the village to conduct an investigation. It was reported that the situation on the ground was calm. Seven dead militants, dressed in black uniforms with rifles in their hands were lying by the stream and in the surrounding area. Rifles, ammunition, mortars, and anti-tank weapons were seized from the houses where the militants were staying.

Samidin Xhezairi, the commander of the KLA unit in Ješkovo, reported that 24 to 27 Yugoslav personnel were killed in the fighting. There are several claims on the casualties suffered by the KLA. Albanian-media reports that 9 were killed and 9 were missing, while the Humanitarian Law Center (HLC) reports that 10 were killed, and 8 were missing. The OSCE reported that 7 were killed, while Yugoslav sources give a higher number, stating that up to 21 were killed in the operation.

The OSCE also reported that over 300 residents of nearby Hoča Zagradska fled during the fighting. Residents of Hoča Zagradska informed the OSCE before the operation of their concern about the KLA presence in the area. The OSCE had also made the KLA aware that the security forces saw their presence in the area as a provocation.

On 17 March, the funeral of nine KLA militants killed in Ješkovo took place. Meanwhile, the Yugoslav Army and the Ministry of Internal Affairs launched an operation to retake the villages of Kabaš and Koriša, in the Prizren municipality, about 14 kilometres away from Ješkovo. It was directed at a KLA unit of the 125th Brigade, numbering about 20 militants. The VJ along with special police units, supported by tanks and artillery, had retaken the villages after fighting which led to the deaths of one soldier and three militants. Lulzim Kabashi, the KLA commander in Kabaš reported that an Albanian militant held off about 50 Yugoslav paramilitaries.

On 18 March, the Kosovo Albanian, the American, and the British delegations signed the Rambouillet Accords, while the Yugoslav and Russian delegations refused. Reports indicated that 30,000 more Yugoslav troops along with armored vehicles, tanks, and irregular paramilitary units were being deployed. Due to the non-compliance of the Yugoslav government by the build up of forces beyond the acceptable levels, the OSCE-KVM verifiers withdrew on 20 March. Then, after the OSCE-KVM verifiers had left, according to the U.S. State Department, government forces “launched a significant operation against KLA [Kosovo Liberation Army] forces,” and on 23 March “targeted” Priština, Peć, and other cities “for ethnic cleansing”.

On 23 March 1999, Yugoslavia announced on national television it had declared a state of emergency citing an "imminent threat of war ... against Yugoslavia by NATO" and began a large mobilization of troops and resources. On 24 March, NATO started the bombing campaign against Yugoslavia.

== Sources ==
- Judah, Tim (2002). Kosovo: War and Revenge. New Haven, Connecticut: Yale University Press. ISBN 978-0-300-09725-2.
- LeBor, Adam (2002). Milosevic: A Biography. New York: Yale University Press. ISBN 978-0-300-10317-5.
- Drecun, Milovan (2004). Drugi kosovski boj. M. Drecun. ISBN 978-86-84771-09-6.
