= Bashkim Suka =

Bashkim Ismajl Suka
- Born: 2 February 1979; Prizren, District of Prizren, Autonomous Province of Kosovo and Metohija, Socialist Federal Republic of Yugoslavia
- Died: 11 March 1999 (aged 20); Ješkovo, District of Prizren, Autonomous Province of Kosovo and Metohija, Federal Republic of Yugoslavia
- Burial place: Pagarushë, Kosovo
- Military career
- Allegiance: Republic of Kosova
- Service years: 1998-1999
- Unit: Special Unit of the 125th Brigade
- Commands: Kosovo Liberation Army; 125th Brigade; Special Unit
- Known for: his role in the Prizren operational zone
- Conflicts: Kosovo War; Battle of Hoča Zagradska (1998); Battle of Ješkovo
- Awards: Hero of Kosovo Order; Freedom Fighter “Adem Jashari” Order

Bashkim Ismajl Suka (2 February 1979 – 11 March 1999) was a Kosovo Albanian militant who served as a commander of the Special Unit of the 125th Brigade of the Kosovo Liberation Army (KLA) during the Kosovo War. He participated in KLA operations in the southern Prizren region throughout 1998, including the Yugoslav offensive on Prizren, where he was wounded. Suka was killed in action during the Battle of Ješkovo on 11 March 1999 while defending KLA positions against Yugoslav Army (VJ) and Ministry of Internal Affairs (MUP) forces. In 2015, he was posthumously awarded the order of Freedom Fighter “Adem Jashari.” 4 years later, in 2019, he was posthumously awarded the Order “Hero of Kosovo” by the President of Kosovo in recognition of his service.

== Early life ==
Bashkim Suka was born on 2 February 1979 in the Lagja e Trimave neighbourhood of Prizren, Kosovo, to Ismajl Suka from Bllacë and Halime Caka from Budakovë. He had four siblings, those being Floria, Muhamet, Avni, and Abdyl.

Suka completed his primary education in Prizren before attending the Gani Qafdërbasha Secondary Technical School, where he studied automotive mechanics.

During his education, he became involved in the underground Albanian national resistance movement, particularly in a group operating in the Tusus neighbourhood of Prizren. In 1990, through his uncle Islam Caka, an activist in the Albanian national movement, he met Nasim Elshani from Nagac. He subsequently established connections with Xhevat Berisha, Salajdin Braha, Ismajl Kryeziu, Elbasan Shoshaj, and Mursel Osmani, several of whom later became associated with the KLA.

In January 1990, Suka participated in demonstrations in Krushë e Madhe. He also attended commemorations held in villages throughout the Anadrinë in honour of fallen Albanian activists and resistance members, including Nasim Elshani, Agron Fetahu, Halim Hoti, Hilmi Krasniqi, and Besim Ndreca from Shirokë.

His family was subjected to surveillance and persecution by the authorities because of its political activities. Suka was reportedly followed, beaten, and mistreated but avoided imprisonment. He continued his activities alongside relatives in Bllacë until 1997, when he began travelling to the Drenas area. In the villages of Krojmir, Shalë, and Kezharekë, where he established connections with the underground resistance in Drenica.

== Kosovo War ==
In May 1998, following the deaths of Përparim Thaçi, Fehim Gashi, and Sakip Bellaqa, Suka became involved in organizing and expanding the KLA in the Prizren region.

He was assigned to the Local Operational Headquarters for Vërrin, based in Jeshkovë. He subsequently began military training and worked to organize logistics.

After completing his training, Suka joined the military police squad. He was later appointed squad commander in the Special Unit of the 125th Brigade. He fought alongside several KLA figures in the Prizren region, including Remzi Ademaj, Xhevat Berisha, Hysen Rexhepi, Fatmir Berisha, and Agim Shala. His activities reportedly contributed to increased persecution from authorities toward his family. His family’s house in Prizren was subsequently burned. The authorities reported that it started from an electric fire, which was found to be not true.

Suka participated in the Battle of Hoçë e Qytetit and the Battle of Vërrin. The 125th Brigade withdrew to Retia after the battle. During the time in Reti, he served as an instructor and participated in engagements in the Dukagjin Operational Zone. During the Battle of Vërrin, in Jeshkovë on 2 September 1998, Suka and Fatmir Berisha were both seriously wounded. They received medical treatment, Suka was shot in the back and stomach. Suka survived his injuries, while Fatmir Berisha later died from his wounds.

== Death ==
At dawn, on 11 March 1999, the Yugoslav Army (VJ) and the Ministry of Internal Affairs (MUP) surrounded the village of Jeshkovë. The VJ/MUP shelled the village, then later advanced towards it. Fighting broke out in the village, at a distance of 10-15 metres. The fighting lasted for hours. In the afternoon, Suka ordered his squad to follow through with an extraction system they had practiced beforehand. The plan involved following a nearby stream up the mountains, then descending to the villages of Kobajë and Vlashnjë, then eventually reaching Reti. As Suka led his squad through the stream, they were ambushed by the VJ. Suka fell in battle.

== Burial ==
On 17 March 1999, Suka and other KLA members killed during the Battle of Jeshkovë were buried in the Martyrs’ Cemetery in Pagarushë.

On 15 September 1999, his remains were reinterred at the Garden of Martyrs in Landovicë, Prizren. A joint memorial dedicated to Suka and the other KLA member killed in the battle was built in Jeshkovë. A street in Prizren was also named after him.

He reportedly constructed a single-shot target pistol and a hunting rifle. His family preserved these objects alongside his personal diary, çifteli, and a necklace containing a military medallion. His mother, Halime, also preserved personal belongings and photographs associated with his life and military service.
