= Prizren (disambiguation) =

Prizren is a city in Kosovo.

Prizren may also refer to:

== Territorial entities ==
- Prizren District (disambiguation)
  - District of Prizren, the district of which the city serves as the capital
  - Prizren District (Serbia), claimed district of Serbia, corresponding to the above and under Kosovan control
- Prizren Municipality, the municipality of the city
- Sanjak of Prizren, sanjak (district) of the Ottoman Empire
- Roman Catholic Diocese of Prizren, former diocese of Catholic Church, that existed until 1969
- Apostolic Administration of Prizren, current apostolic administration of Catholic Church, that exists since 2000
- Serbian Orthodox Diocese of Prizren, former eparchy of Serbian Orthodox Church, that existed until 1818

== Other ==
- League of Prizren, Albanian league in the Ottoman Empire
- Prizren Fortress, a fortress in the city

== See also ==
- Prizrenac (disambiguation)
