= Radenović =

Radenović (Cyrillic script: Раденовић) is a Serbian surname derived from a masculine given name Raden. It may refer to:

- Ivan Radenović (born 1984), basketball player
- Pavle Radenović (fl. 1381–1415), nobleman
- Vasilije Radenović, (born 1994), Montenegrin footballer
- Veljko Radenović (1955–2012), police general
- Zdravko Rađenović (born 1952), Bosnia and Herzegovina former handball player
