= Sokoli =

Sokoli is an Albanian surname. Notable people with the surname include:

- Ali Sokoli (1921–1974), Albanian pulmonologist
- Bylbyl Sokoli (born 1957), Kosovar politician, football manager, former player and university professor
- Fatime Sokoli (1948–1987), Albanian folk music singer
- Hodo Sokoli (1836–1883), Albanian colonel
- Kristjan Sokoli (born 1991), Albanian American football player
- Merita Sokoli (1924–2007), Albanian soprano singer and actress
- Mic Sokoli (1839–1881), Albanian nationalist figure and guerrilla fighter
- Paolo Sokoli (born 1995), Albanian footballer
- Ramadan Sokoli (1920–2008), Albanian ethnomusicologist, musician, composer and writer
