= List of Serbian journalists who disappeared in Kosovo =

From August 1998 to September 2000, at least seven Serbian journalists disappeared and are believed to have been killed in Kosovo, during and in the aftermath of the Kosovo War (1998–99). The perpetrators are assumed to have been Kosovo Liberation Army (KLA) members, but there has been no convictions.

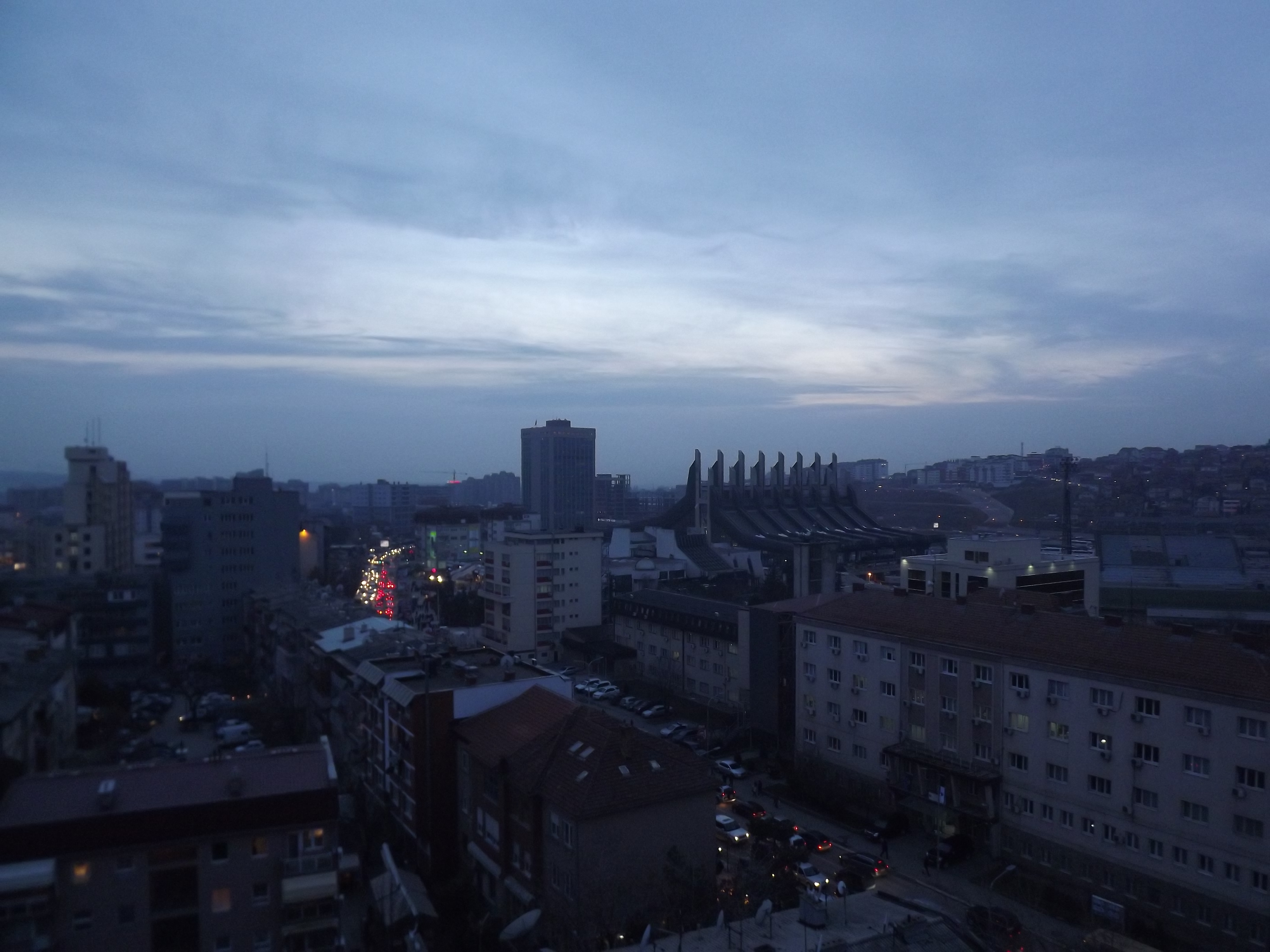
Most of the journalists disappeared in Pristina, now the capital of the Kosovo.

- Ranko Perenić (born 25 September 1958 in Lipljan) and Đuro Slavuj (born 24 December 1962 in Dvor na Uni) were journalists of RTV Priština who disappeared on August 21, 1998. Earlier that day they had set out for the Zočište Monastery to gather information on the freed Orthodox monks who had been kidnapped by the KLA. They were last seen in Velika Hoča from where they were to drive towards Zočište, but instead they made a wrong turn towards Orahovac, which was under the control of the KLA. The car which they drove, a blue Zastava 128, was never found. They were the first Serbs working for the media that disappeared during the conflict.
- Ljubomir Knežević (born 25 May 1939 in Ulcinj) was a journalist of Pristina newspaper Jedinstvo and correspondent of Belgrade daily Politika. He disappeared on 6 May 1999 near Vučitrn at the foot of Čičavica. Bekim Shuti "Niku", KLA commander in Shala operational zone, is suspected for his disappearance. Knežević is believed to have been kidnapped by Shuti's unit and taken to their headquarters in the Ošljane village where he was tortured and killed. Police documents mention two possible perpetrators and nine more suspects, but the Kosovo police did not interrogate any of these.
- Aleksandar Simović (born 1 October 1968 in Prizren) was a journalist and translator who disappeared on 21 August 1999 in Pristina. Part of his remains were found in the Obrinje village near Glogovac. His family has not received any official information on the investigation and defendants in the case.
- Marjan Melonaši (born 3 July 1976 in Pristina) was a reporter for the Serbian editorial of Radio Kosovo who disappeared on 9 September 2000 in Pristina. According to his family he was last seen entering a taxi outside the office. Only in 2005 the Kosovo police showed interest in the case and entered testimonies into their data base and then closed the case. The police did not investigate his home or his work place. It is likely that the murder was politically motivated.
- Momir Stokuća (born 2 October 1949 in Belgrade) was a photojournalist who reported to Politika that disappeared on 21 September 1999 in his family home in the Pristina centre Đura Jakšić street 15. His family has not received any official information on the investigation.
- Milo Buljević, RTS employee in Pristina, was according to eye witness testimonies abducted on 25 June 1999 in Pristina by men wearing KLA uniforms.

The Association of Journalists of Serbia has asked of EULEX, UNMIK, Kosovo Police, the War Crimes Prosecution Office and War Crimes Court to initiate and renew investigations and public campaigns to encourage individuals to speak. The signs calling on information about the cases have been destroyed once set up. As of December 2017, out of 14 cases, the Kosovo Prosecution is investigating seven and three were to be handed over to EULEX.

== Sources ==
- "U nedelju 18 godina od otmice novinara Đura Slavuja i Ranka Perenića". UNS vesti. UNS. 19 August 2016.
- S. S. (21 August 2013). "Na Kosovu ubijeno i nestalo 6 novinara". Telegraf.
- "Još se traže novinari Radio Prištine koje je oteo OVK". Tema dana. Vesti online. 21 August 2010.
- "Journalists Missing". CPJ. February 2008.
- "UNS i DNKiM: Da se otkrije istina o svim nestalim novinarima na KiM". in4s. 25 November 2016.
- "UNS demands investigation into missing and murdered journalists in Kosovo". European Journalists. 15 January 2015.
- "UNS: How murders of journalists in Kosovo were "lost"". B92. 7 December 2017.
