= Zatriq (fortress) =

Zatrič Zatriq
- Zatrić, Rahovec, Kosovo
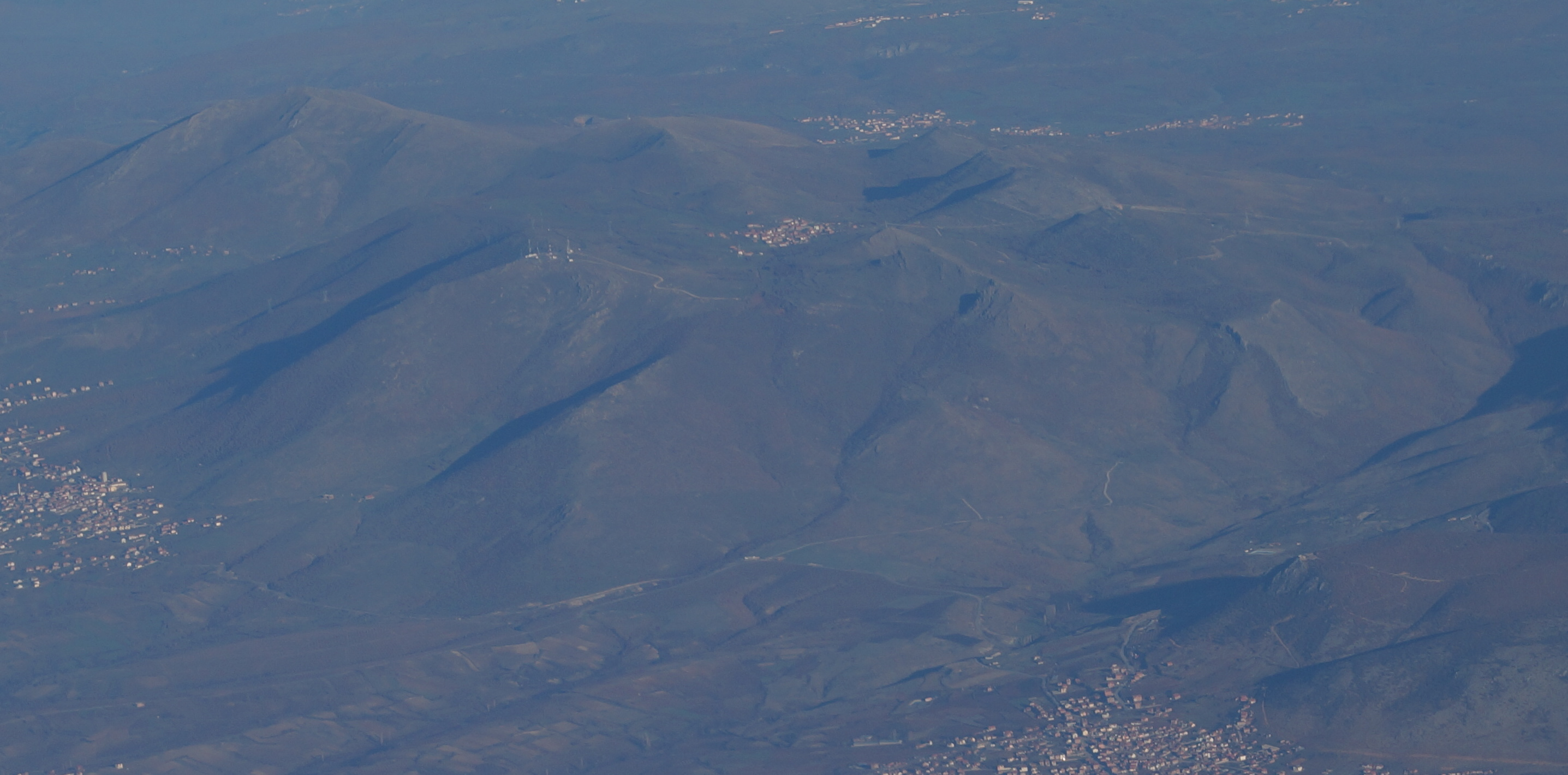
- Aerial view of Zatriq village and area, the fortress located on a hill in front of the small village

Site information
- Type: fortification

Location
- Coordinates: 42°26′43″N 20°38′10″E

Site history
- In use: cca. 900 - cca. 1400
- Materials: Stone

Zatriq or Zatrič (Serbian Cyrillic: Затрич; Albanian: Zatriqi) is a fortress in Kosovo, whose ruins are located near the village of Zatrić (old name: Zatrič), ten kilometers north of Rahovec. It is located at the top of Gradište, 1,013 meters above sea level, which dominates the valley of White Drin and Prizren.

== Layout ==
Zatrič consists of the upper town, located at the very top, around which down town was spread. Top Gradište has a shape that resembles a sharp tooth or beak, with southern and eastern sides protected by isolated and sharp rocks that, in some places, reach up to 50 meters. On its north side, there is a natural plateau, on which research discovered ceramics and brick remains were discovered, contours of four-squared and polygonal facilities, and the basis of towers and ramps, which were connected the lower town to upper town.

== History ==
Historical records have no information on it, while Jastrebov believes that it was an old Byzantine fort, larger than in one Prizren, which could house thousands of people.

== See also ==
- List of fortresses in Kosovo
