= Lluka e Poshtme =

Village in Deçan, Kosovo

Lluka e Poshtme; or; Lluka e Ulët
- Village
- Location within Kosovo
- Coordinates: 42°32′44″N 20°20′8″E
- Country: Kosovo
- District: Gjakova
- Municipality: Deçan

Population (2024)
  - Total: 272
- Time zone: UTC+1 (Central European Time)
  - Summer (DST): UTC+2 (CEST)

Lluka e Poshtme, or Lluka e Ulët, is a village in the municipality of Deçan in Kosovo. As of 2024, the village has a population of 272 inhabitants, comprising 58 households.

== Population history ==
The population of Lluka e Poshtme has risen over the decades since 1961 to a considerable degree, yet fell to the same numbers as in the 1950s since the last census in 2011. A large portion of the village has emigrated outside of the country, much of which went to the United States, Germany, Switzerland, and other European Union countries. The entirety of Lluka e Poshtme is ethnically Albanian.

Population	1948 census	1953 census	1961 census	1971 census	1981 census	1991 census	2011 census	2024 census
Population	Number	Number	Number	Number	Number	Number	Number	Number
Albanians	267	267	291	339	489	608	506	272

== History ==
The Gecaj family of Lluka e Poshtme are of the Berisha fis, settling the village some time between the late 1700s and early 1800s. Today the family is entirely Muslim, though their origins are Catholic from Northern Albania. The family has grown considerably and multiple members have become known war heroes. These include Ali Geci, who served in the Kosovo War in 1999, his relatives like Selim Lluka, Tahir Selimi, and various others who fought against Montenegrin forces in the early 1900s.

The Gecaj family is also the founder and owner of Stone Castle, one of the largest wineries in Europe, located in Rahovec. The winery was bought and owned by Rrustem Gecaj in 2006 for 5.5 million Euros and exports internationally throughout Europe and the United States.

== Culture ==
The village is home to various old towers, such as Kulla e Ali Gecit, Kulla e Florim Januz Gecaj, and Kulla e Rrustem Gecaj.
