= Bajram Gecaj =

Bajram Gecaj is the Kosovo Deputy Minister of Local Government.

== Biography ==
Bajram Gecaj was born on April 13, 1963, in the village of Lluka e Poshtme. Finished elementary school in his hometown, high school and continued in Pristina where he completed undergraduate studies at the Faculty of Law of the University (1987). Master studies (MA) has completed at Staffordshire University UK in International Politics and Diplomacy.

For reasons of political nature in 1988 he emigrated to the UK, to return to Kosovo a few days after the entry of NATO troops (1999). During his stay in the UK, he served as legal representatives in various legal companies in London. Among the activities during their stay in the UK was engaged as a translator for refugees displaced from Kosovo and Bosnia.

== Career ==
He was active on the political issue of Kosovo through political organizations as well as non-political ones. Is the founder and Chairman of the branch of the (LDK), and during the war was the leader of the Group Emergency Kosovo, an umbrella organization of all associations Albanian-Kosovo in the UK and leader in charity "Kosovo Aid ". During this time, he exercised the function of spokesman for the English international media, such as BBC, CNN, SKY NEWS, CBC, NBC, ABC, and ITN.

After returning to Kosovo, he joined the OSCE Mission in Kosovo, the function of the RA Law, and in 2000 continued commitment to the Liaison Office of the US Pristina (the 2008 US Embassy), the function of Specialist (Analyst ) Senior Political.

Since 2008 is a lecturer at University College "Dardania" in Pristina, followed doctoral studies at the University "Hasan Prishtina". In the parliamentary elections of 2014, he joined the list of candidates for deputies to the Assembly of Kosovo, and now serves as Deputy Minister in the Ministry of Local Government and Political Advisor to the Prime Minister Mr. Isa Mustafa.
