= Zatriq, Rahovec =

Zatriq Zatrić
- Village
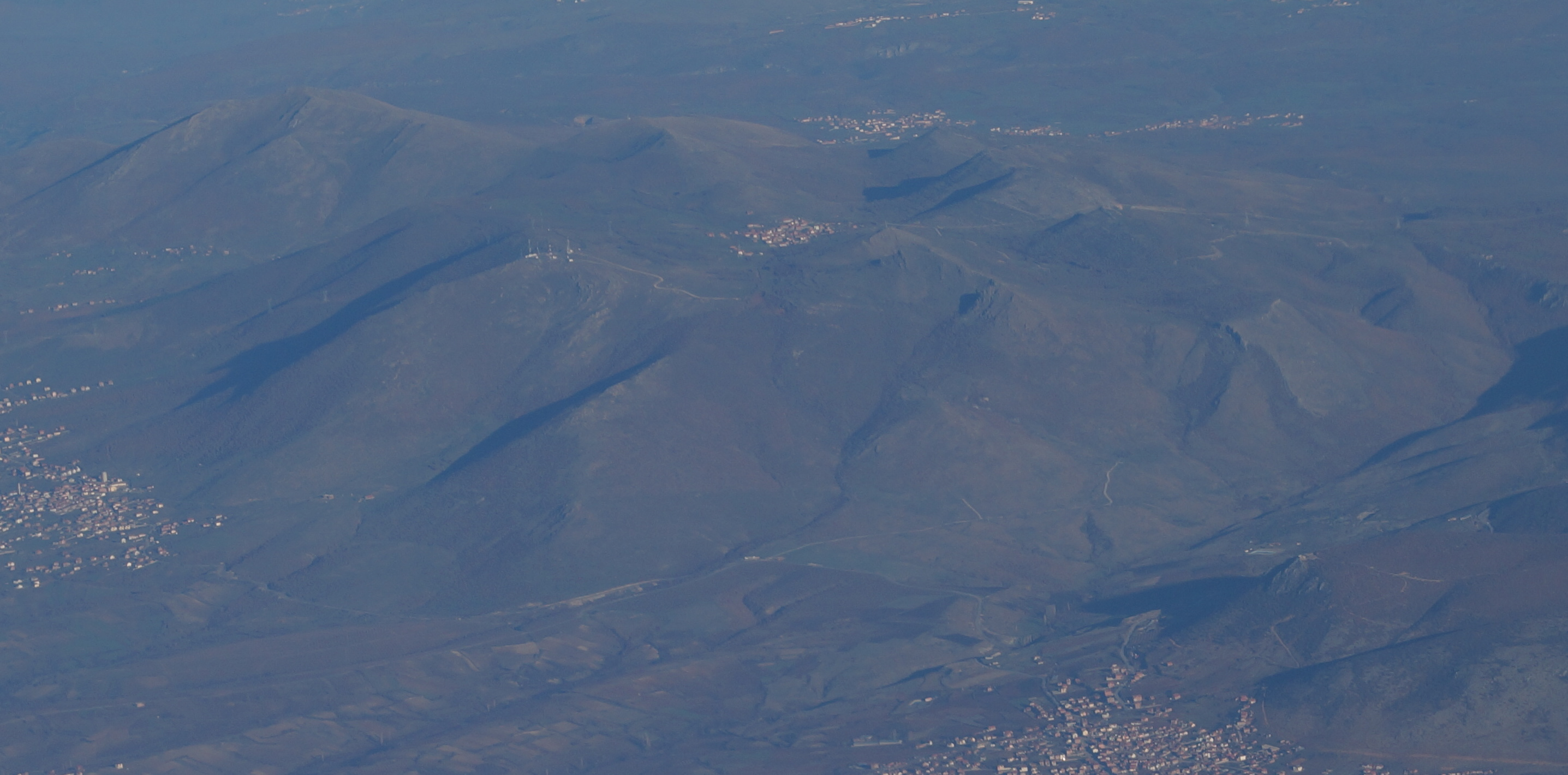
- Aerial view of the hills North of Rahovec with the small village in the centre

- Location in Kosovo
- Location: Kosovo
- District: Gjakova
- Municipality: Rahovec

Population (2024)
  - Total: 196
- Time zone: UTC+1 (CET)
  - Summer (DST): UTC+2 (CEST)

Zatriq or Zatrić is a village in municipality of Rahovec in Kosovo. Above the village there are the remains of fortress Zatriq. The village consists only of Albanians.
