= KLA Summer offensive (1998) =

Kosovo Liberation Army offensive

- Part of the Kosovo War
Date	14 June – 18 July 1998
Location	Kosovo, FR Yugoslavia
Result	KLA strategic failure: KLA eventually gets routed by a Yugoslav counter-offensive
Territorial changes	KLA captures 40% of Kosovo (KLA claim, unverified)

Belligerents
Kosovo Liberation Army	(Federal Republic of Yugoslavia) FR Yugoslavia

Commanders and leaders
Ismet Jashari; Ramush Haradinaj; Ekrem Rexha; Sylejman Selimi; Shaban Shala; Fehmi Lladrovci; Mujë Krasniqi; Agim Ramadani; Bekim Berisha; Agim Çelaj; Ismet Tara; Fatmir Limaj; Agim Shala	(Federal Republic of Yugoslavia) Goran Radosavljević (Federal Republic of Yugoslavia) Sreten Lukić (Federal Republic of Yugoslavia) Nebojša Pavković

Units involved
Kosovo Liberation Army; Drenica Operational Zone; Pashtrik Operational Zone; Dukagjin Operational Zone	Yugoslav Army; Priština Corps; 252nd Armored Brigade of Kraljevo; Yugoslav Air Force; Ministry of Internal Affairs; Special Anti-Terrorist Unit; Special Police Units; Operational Group; Munja paramilitary unit; Special Operations Unit

Strength
Unknown	(Federal Republic of Yugoslavia) 50,000 personnel

Casualties and losses
Heavy casualities	(Federal Republic of Yugoslavia) 80 policemen killed
- (Albania) Hundreds of Thousands of civilians displaced

The KLA Summer offensive in Kosovo (Albanian: Ofensiva verore e UÇK-së, Serbian: Летња офанзива ОВК; romanized: Letnja ofanziva OVK) was a large scale offensive by the Kosovo Liberation Army (KLA) against the Yugoslav Army (VJ) and the Ministry of Internal Affairs (MUP) that took place in Kosovo during the summer of 1998.

It began when the KLA switched their tactics from hit and run operations to conventional warfare. KLA units began launching operations to surround and attack towns, and to expand their territory. The KLA had captured about 40% of Kosovo, and set up roadblocks in many areas. Although this has been disputed since the KLA denied access to observers in many areas.

== Background ==
Following World War II, Kosovo was given the status of an autonomous province within the Socialist Republic of Serbia, one of six constitutional republics of the Socialist Federal Republic of Yugoslavia. After the death of Yugoslavia's long-time leader Josip Broz Tito in 1980, Yugoslavia's political system began to unravel. In 1989, Belgrade abolished self-rule in Kosovo, as well as Serbia's other autonomous province, Vojvodina, as part of Serbian President Slobodan Milošević's "anti-bureaucratic revolution". Though inhabited predominantly by ethnic Albanians, Kosovo was of great historical and cultural significance to the Serbs. Alarmed by their dwindling numbers, the province's Serbs began to fear they were being "squeezed out" by the Albanians. As soon as Kosovo's autonomy was abolished, a minority government run by Serbs and Montenegrins was appointed by Milošević to oversee the province, enforced by thousands of heavily armed paramilitaries from Serbia-proper. Albanian culture was systematically repressed and hundreds of thousands of Albanians working in state-owned companies lost their jobs.

In 1996, a group of Albanian nationalists calling themselves the Kosovo Liberation Army (KLA) began attacking the Yugoslav Army (Serbo-Croatian: Vojska Jugoslavije; VJ) and the Serbian Ministry of Internal Affairs (Serbo-Croatian: Ministarstvo unutrašnjih poslova; MUP) in Kosovo. Their goal was to separate the province from the rest of Yugoslavia, which following the separation of Slovenia, Croatia, Macedonia and Bosnia-Herzegovina in 1991–92, became a rump federation made up of Serbia and Montenegro. At first the KLA carried out hit-and-run attacks: 31 in 1996, 55 in 1997, and 66 in January and February 1998 alone. The group quickly gained popularity among young Kosovo Albanians, many of whom favoured a more aggressive approach and rejected the non-violent resistance of politician Ibrahim Rugova. The organization received a significant boost in 1997, when an armed uprising in neighbouring Albania led to thousands of weapons from the Albanian Army's depots being looted. Many of these weapons ended up in the hands of the KLA. The KLA also received substantial funds from its involvement in the drug trade. The group's popularity skyrocketed after the VJ and MUP attacked the compound of KLA leader Adem Jashari in March 1998, killing him, his closest associates and most of his extended family. The attack motivated thousands of young Kosovo Albanians to join the KLA, fueling the Kosovar uprising that eventually erupted in the spring of 1998.

== June ==
Combined with the growth of volunteers after the attack on the Jashari compound and a flood of arms following the 1997 Albanian civil unrest, the KLA was positioned to become a full-fledged force, reaching the culmination of its efforts in the summer of 1998 with a military offensive.

On 14 June, after fighting in the Mališevo region, the KLA declared that they were in control of the area. The Associated Press reported that the KLA had mounted a roadblock on the road leading to the town, and that they were in control of the town. Five days later, on 19 June, the police exchanged fire with Albanian villagers near the town of Orahovac, leading to the police withdrawing to the town. 2 days later, three policemen were killed in Donji Crnobreg, near Dečani. On 22 June, the KLA seized the Belaćevac coal mine near the town of Obilić. This operation by the KLA would threaten energy supplies to the region. Upon entering the mine, the militants took a number of Serb mineworkers hostage, halting production. On 23 June, Yugoslav forces launched an assault on the town of Junik, but failed to regain control over the area. The VJ shelled the village of Smonica along with other villages near Ðakovica, and deployed tanks to the area. On 25 June, the KLA began training exercises in Smonica. On 29 June, hundreds of soldiers and policemen, backed with armored vehicles and tanks moved to recapture Belaćevac.

== July ==
By 1 July, Belaćevac was under Yugoslav control. On 6 July, the KLA and launched attacks on Serb families residing in Lođa, a village near Peć. The MUP sent a police convoy from Peć to evacuate the Serb families. The police managed to reach the families and evacuate them. The KLA ambushed the convoy as it was moving towards Peć. In the following clashes, police commander Srđan Perović, sergeants Dejan Prelević and Mirko Radunović, along with five other policemen were killed. The MUP launched several operations in Lođa up until 12 July to retrieve the bodies of the policemen, but they were unsuccessful. The KLA reported that they repelled the attacks. On 7 July, in Biluša, a village south of Prizren, policemen failed to ambush KLA militants. Heavy clashes ensued, and the MUP retreated from the area. The KLA expanded its territorial control and acquired quantities of anti-tank and anti-aircraft weapons. The improved firepower had helped halt Yugoslav efforts to retake militant-held areas. The KLA was reported to have received weapons through supply routes from Albania, including rocket-propelled grenades and German-made Armbrust anti-tank weapons. The movement was also expanding its ranks through new recruits, financial support from the Albanian diaspora, and the arrival of former soldiers, including veterans of the Yugoslav Army and ethnic Albanians who had fought in the Croatian War of Independence. There was an organized KLA presence in militant-held areas, with units operating in larger formations and maintaining communications by radio. The KLA made further advances in western Kosovo, moving closer to Peć and Đakovica. KLA units captured the villages of Nec and Ramoz northwest of Đakovica, establishing positions overlooking the city, as well as the area around Lođa, southeast of Peć. KLA units closed the road to Kijevo after it had been reopened by the police a week prior. Yugoslav Army and police forces were demoralized and were taking significant casualties, as well as an increase in the number of desertions. On 16 July, Yugoslav police of the Prizren SUP began an assault on the village of Hoča Zagradska, which was met by heavy resistance from the KLA and ad hoc Albanian villagers, which led to the eventual Yugoslav retreat.

== Aftermath ==
The KLA's shift from pure guerilla tactics to conventional tactics and positional conflict in the summer of 1998 resulted in it reportedly holding 40% of Kosovo territory by the end of the June. However, the summer offensive was a "military disaster" for the KLA according to Henry H. Perritt Jr., as Serbian forces had a much larger numerical advantage, especially after the involvement of the Yugoslav army. In mid-July, Yugoslav forces launched a counter-offensive.

=== Battle of Orahovac ===
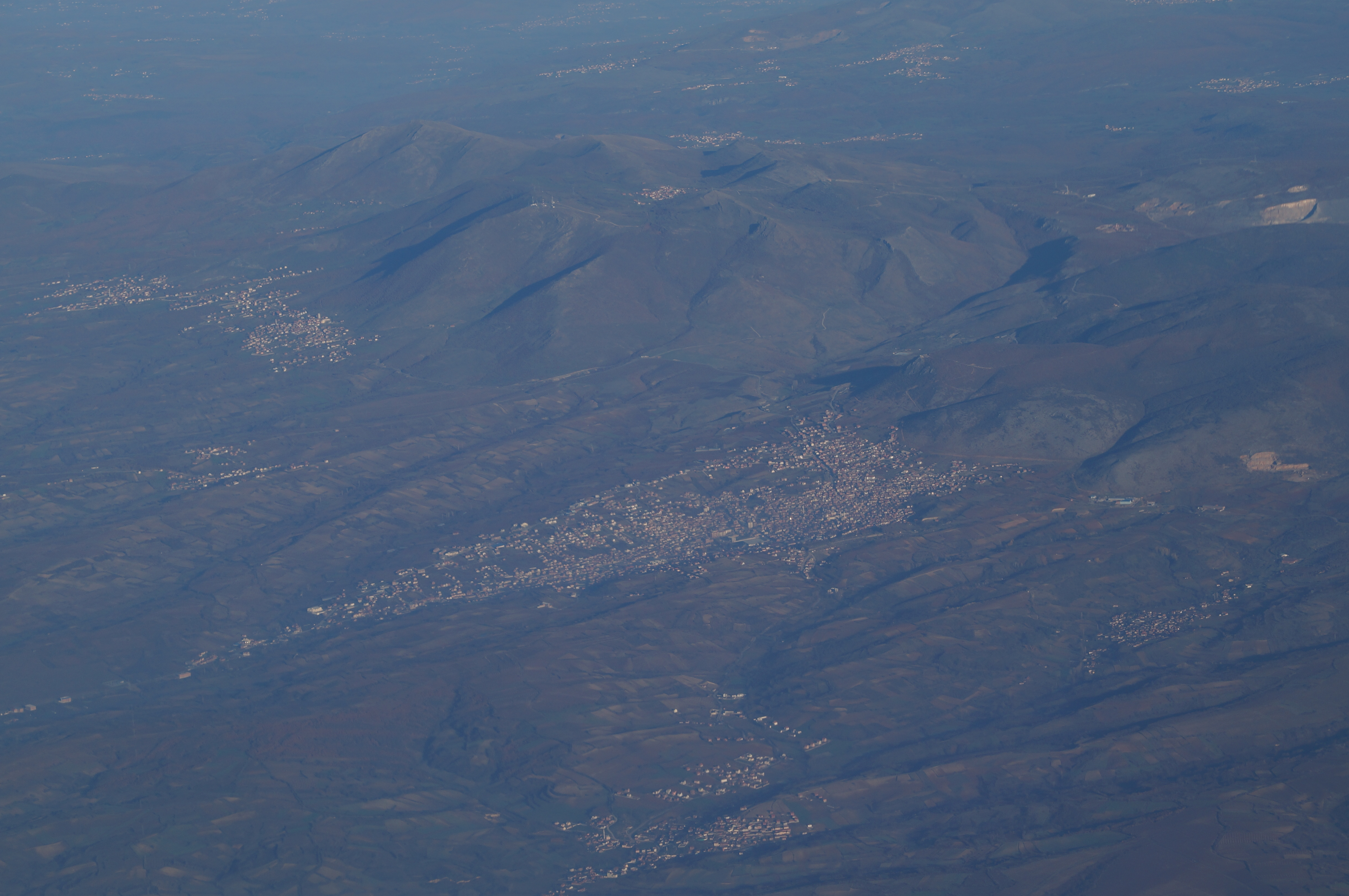
Aerial Image of Rahovec

On 17 July 1998, the KLA launched a offensive on the town of Orahovac and the surrounding villages. Orahovac and the surrounding area was subsequently captured by the KLA, which led to a Yugoslav counteroffensive, in which the town was recaptured in only 3 days, expelling 25,000 people and killing at least 64 Albanian civilians.

=== Drenica attacks ===
Drenica attacks
- Part of the Kosovo War
- Location: Drenica, AP Kosovo, FR Yugoslavia
- Date: 1–31 August 1998
- Target: MUP police
- Attack type: hit and run operations, ambushes, raids, guerrilla warfare
- Weapons: machine guns, assault rifles, snipers, landmines, rocket propelled grenades
- Deaths: 17 policemen
- Perpetrator: KLA militants
- Motive: Albanian nationalism

In Drenica, during August, the KLA launched a series of attacks on MUP personnel. KLA militants mined roads, booby-trapped houses, dug trenches, established checkpoints, and built bunkers. Because of the geography of the Drenica region, MUP personnel were prone to attacks by KLA militants. Hit-and-run attacks were launched by the KLA, which was deadly for MUP personnel as the KLA would slip out of the area after launching attacks, giving the MUP no time to react. Throughout August, 17 MUP policemen were killed. In early August, the Yugoslav forces had launched an offensive on the Drenica region and managed to capture a few villages, including Llaushë and Likovac leading to thousands of Kosovar Albanian civilians to be driven into the hills.

== Sources ==
- Judah, Tim (2002). Kosovo: War and Revenge. Yale University Press. ISBN 978-0-300-09725-2.
