= Ajet Shehu =

English footballer (born 1990)

Personal information
- Date of birth: 31 December 1990 (age 35)
- Place of birth: Rahovec, Kosovo
- Height: 1.88 m (6 ft 2 in)
- Position: Centre-back

Youth career
- –2007: Barnet
- 2007–2009: Tottenham Hotspur
- 2007: → Norwich City (loan)
- 2008: → Leyton Orient (loan)

Senior career*
Years	Team	Apps	(Gls)
2007–2009	Tottenham Hotspur	0	(0)
2007	→ Norwich City (loan)	0	(0)
2008	→ Leyton Orient (loan)	0	(0)
2008	→ Leatherhead (loan)		
2008–2009	→ Staines Town (loan)		
2009	→ Ware (loan)		
2009	Cheltenham Town	0	(0)
2010	Ware	2	(0)
2010–2011	Wingate & Finchley		
2011	Gramozi Ersekë	11	(0)
2012–2013	Codicote	?	(?)
2013	Harrow Borough	0	(0)
2014	Codicote	1	(0)
2014–2015	Ware	21	(3)
- * Club domestic league appearances and goals

Ajet Shehu (born 31 December 1990) is an English retired footballer who played as a centre-back.

== Career ==
=== Early career ===
Shehu was born in Rahovec, modern day Kosovo, but moved to England with his family as a child to escape the conflicts in the Balkans, settling in West London. He attended Islington Arts and Media School, where he was part of the school team that won the Camden and Islington Cup in 2005, and where he caught the attention of scouts from Barnet who eventually signed the player to their academy. During his time at college he studied BTEC Sports, and he also joined an agency called Protec who offered Ajeti trials with Reading, Watford and Tottenham Hotspur.

He decided to join Tottenham full-time and signed a two-year contract in 2007, but after only a handful of games for the club's academy and joined Norwich City under-18s on loan in 2007, before also being loaned out to Leyton Orient's under-18s. He also had loan spells at non league sides Leatherhead, Staines Town and Ware during his time at Tottenham, as well as going on trial with Cheltenham Town in April 2009 after begin told he would not be offered another contract by Tottenham, before also going on trial with Aldershot Town at the end of the 2008–09 season.

=== Post Tottenham ===
Ajeti joined League Two side Cheltenham Town on a non contract basis in the summer of 2009 following his release from Tottenham, but he failed to make an appearance for the club during his short spell.

By September 2019, he had retired.
