= Besim Mala =

Kosovo Liberation Army soldier

- Born: 14 August 1971; Glogovac, SR Serbia, SFR Yugoslavia (today Drenas, Kosovo)
- Died: 17 April 2000 (aged 28); Pristina, Kosovo under UN administration
- Military career
- Allegiance: Kosovo Liberation Army; Kosovo Protection Corps
- Service years: 1998–2000
- Rank: Commander
- Nickname: Komandant Murrizi
- Unit: Special Unit "Black Tigers" of KLA
- Conflicts: Kosovo War; Attacks in Drenas; Yugoslav offensive in Drenica (1999)
- Awards: Hero of Kosovo (posthumously)

Besim Mala (14 August 1971 – 17 April 2000) was one of the most well known commandants of Kosovo Liberation Army and the first Commander of the Special Force in the Kosovo Protection Corps, who was killed under suspicious circumstances as part of a killing series in the early 2000s.

== Early life ==
Besim Mala was born on 14 August 1971 in the City of Drenas, Kosovo. He was raised in a family known for its opposition to the Serbian regime. His father, Bislim, was a diligent worker from a patriotic family. Mala completed his primary education in Drenas and continued his secondary studies at the "Skënderbeu" School Center.

In 1989, prior to the Dissolution of Yugoslavia, Mala, like many young Albanians, left Kosovo to avoid mandatory military service in the Yugoslav army. He moved to the Netherlands, where he found employment. Despite being abroad, Mala remained committed to the idea of armed resistance for Kosovo's independence. He believed that Kosovo could only achieve freedom through military action rather than political negotiation. During this time, he formed a close bond with Ferid Berisha, with whom he remained closely associated until his death.

== Military career ==
=== Involvement in the Kosovo Liberation Army ===
In the spring of 1998, as tensions escalated in Kosovo, Besim Mala decided to leave his newly created family in the Netherlands to join the Kosovo Liberation Army (KLA) in its armed struggle for independence from Serbia and Yugoslavia. Mala traveled to Albania and crossed into Kosovo to join the KLA fighters who were mobilizing in the Drenica region. Initially, he was based in the villages of Baicë and Elshan in Drenas, areas that had become strongholds for KLA operations. Here, he joined a group of prominent KLA fighters, including Fehmi Lladrovci, Rasim Kiçina, Musë Jashari, and Jahir Demaku, who were actively organizing military operations against Serbian forces.

Throughout 1998 and 1999, Mala served as the Commander of the Special Unit "Black Tigers" (Albanian: Tigrat e Zi) of the KLA-Drenica Operational Zone. He quickly became known for his strategic acumen and bravery in combat. His leadership was particularly noted during several key engagements, where he coordinated ambushes and direct confrontations with Serbian military and police units. Some of the significant battles he was involved in included operations in Rezallë and Morinë, and particularly along the Drenas-Skenderaj axis, where he led surprise attacks against Serbian forces.

One of the major operations under his command was the assault on the Glogovac Police Station, a strategic target that was key to undermining Serbian control in the area. Mala also played a crucial role in attacks on Serbian positions at the "Feronikeli" Industrial Complex, which were vital in disrupting the logistical and operational capabilities of the Serbian forces in the region. These operations were characterized by swift and unexpected maneuvers that maximized the KLA's impact despite their limited resources.

On May 18, 1999, Mala orchestrated one of the most daring operations of the KLA—the seizure of a Serbian arms depot in Golesh. This operation involved a complex plan that required coordinating both trained KLA fighters and local civilians. Under cover of darkness, Mala led his unit to capture significant amounts of ammunition and anti-tank mines from the Serbian depot, a move that severely hindered Serbian military operations in the region. The operation not only deprived Serbian forces of vital resources but also boosted the morale of the KLA and local civilian population. After securing the depot, Mala ordered its destruction to prevent any further use by the enemy. The explosives detonated in the depot caused a massive blast, which was initially mistaken by many for a NATO airstrike due to its intensity.

Following this operation, Mala continued to engage in various military actions. Throughout the latter half of May and into June 1999, his unit was active in setting up defensive and offensive positions across the Drenica region, laying anti-tank mines captured from the Golesh depot to ambush Serbian convoys and disrupt their movements. These mines proved effective in neutralizing Serbian armored vehicles, significantly contributing to the KLA's defensive efforts.

Besim Mala's contributions to the KLA were widely recognized for their effectiveness in combat and strategic planning. His actions were instrumental in the broader resistance effort against Serbian forces, showcasing his commitment to Kosovo's independence and the liberation struggle. His leadership during key battles and operations left a lasting impact on the KLA's fight during the Kosovo War.

=== After the Kosovo War ===
Following the end of the Kosovo War in June 1999, Besim Mala, like many KLA fighters, entered Pristina to help maintain order and security. With the disbanding of the KLA and the formation of the Kosovo Protection Corps (TMK), Mala continued his service in this new organization, which inherited the legacy of the KLA's struggle for independence. He focused on strengthening the KPC's defensive capabilities, despite facing challenges from various entities established in Kosovo under UNMIK administration.

== Death ==
On April 17, 2000, Besim Mala was shot and killed in Pristina while on duty, wearing his KPC uniform. The incident took place in front of the Radio Kosova building. Mala was shot in the back by an unknown individual following a previous business dispute. There are reports suggesting that the Serbian secret service might have been involved in orchestrating the attack, because just three weeks after his death, another former KLA-Commander named Ekrem Rexha known as "Komandant Drini" was assassinated. Days before his death, UNMIK authorities had confiscated his legally registered firearm without explanation.

His death and the following serial assassinations and suspicious deaths of former key-figures of the KLA, like Tahir Zemaj or Ekrem Rexha in the early 2000s after the Kosovo War, remain an unsolved enigma in the early history of Kosovo under International Administration.

== Legacy ==
Besim Mala, widenly known by his nom de guerre "Komandant Murrizi," is remembered as a key figure of the KLA and a symbol of Kosovo's fight for independence. His leadership of the elite "Tigrat e Zi" (Black Tigers) unit during the Kosovo War showcased his commitment to the cause of Kosovo independence. Mala's daring actions and surprise attacks against enemy forces made him a respected figure.

He is admired by his comrades and among Kosovar Albanians. Mala's contributions are commemorated annually, emphasizing his role in shaping the spirit of resistance during Kosovo's most challenging times. He remains a symbol of courage, resilience, and dedication, inspiring future generations to continue the pursuit of national sovereignty and self-determination. The local Shooting sports club in Drenas is named after him.
