= Prizren District =

Prizren District may refer to:

- District of Prizren (Kosovo/UNMIK)
- Prizren District (Serbia)
