= Lubizhdë =

Lubizhdë Љубижда Ljubižda
- Village
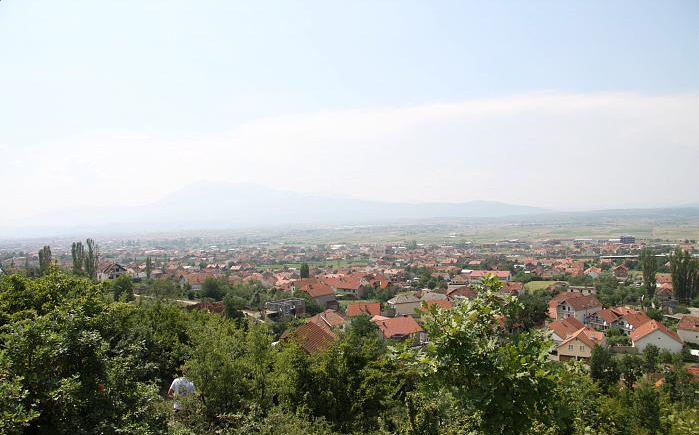
- Interactive map of Lubizhdë
- Location within Kosovo
- Coordinates: 42.238049°N 20.761475°E
- Location: Kosovo
- District: Prizren
- Municipality: Prizren
- Elevation: 524 m (1,719 ft)

Population (2024)
  - Total: 5,500
- Time zone: UTC+1 (CET)
  - Summer (DST): UTC+2 (CEST)

Lubizhdë (Albanian: Lubizhdë, Serbian Cyrillic: Љубижда/Ljubižda) is a village in the Prizren municipality in southern Kosovo.

== History ==
During the early 14th century under the reign of Serbian Emperor Stefan Dušan, Lubizhdë was a prosperous village. The village formed part of the feudal holdings of both the nearby Monastery of St. Mark of Koriša and Monastery of the Holy Archangels. During the 16th century, the village was under the Ottoman administrative division known as the Nahiya of Domeshtiç and its inhabitants were recorded with Albanian anthroponomy, indicating that the village was inhabited by Albanians.

Between 11 and 12 Serbian Orthodox churches were built in and around Lubizhdë during this time however despite its prosperity, the village suffered greatly from the outbreak of the bubonic plague. In 1872 a school was built for the local population and by 1940, there were 76 households in Lubizhdë consisting of 56 Serb households and 23 Muslim households. However, a number of the wives of the Muslim men in the village were Albanian. Restoration works of two local Serbian Orthodox churches commenced in 1897 for the St Nicholas church and 1979 for the St Elijah church. Both churches were destroyed in 1999 following the end of the Kosovo War.

== Demographics ==
The village has a Kosovo Albanian majority.

Ethnicity	2011
Albanians	4207
Bosniaks	1286
Turks	237
Gorani people	75
Roma	48
Serbs	5
Other	124
Total	5986

== Notable people ==
- Ekrem Rexha, also known as Komandant Drini, KLA commander
