= Agim Shala =

Albanian commander (1975 – 1998)

Agim Avdi Shala
- Born: September 18, 1975; Jeshkova, AP Kosovo, SFR Yugoslavia (now Kosovo)
- Died: 3 September 1998 (aged 22); Jeshkova, AP Kosovo, SFR Yugoslavia (now Kosovo)
- Military career
- Allegiance: Kosovo Liberation Army
- Rank: Non-commissioned officer (NCO)
- Nicknames: Albanian “Tigri i Vërrinit” English “Tiger of Vërrin”
- Unit: 125th Brigade
- Known for: Fighting alongside his father and cousin
- Conflicts: First Battle of Vërrin; Second Battle of Vërrin †
- Awards: Hero of Kosovo (posthumously)

Agim Avdi Shala (September 18, 1975 – September 3, 1998) was a Kosovo Albanian commander that fought in the Kosovo Liberation Army (KLA). The goal of the KLA was the independence of Kosovo from FR Yugoslavia. Agim Shala was killed in action during the second Battle of Vërrin.

== Early years ==
Shala was born on September 18, 1975, in the village of Ješkovo, Prizren, to an ethnic Albanian family which belonged to the Shala tribe. He finished primary school in Hoča Zagradska. Agim Shala started high school in Prizren, at the “Gani Çavdërbasha” technical school and construction branch.

Yugoslav authorities began prosecuting Albanian activists, which led to the Shala family’s wealth to decline. This forced Agim to stop the lessons and take the path of Albanian nationalism.

In 1993, Agim Shala left Ješkovo. To escape the arrests, and to earn money, he settled in Rome, Italy, together with Naser Berisha.

== Mobilization ==
Upon hearing about the Attack on Prekaz, Shala, together with many activists, reconnected with his uncle Selim and his friends from Prizren and on 6 May 1998, he was placed in the regional operative headquarters for Prizren in Ješkovo, to assist Remzi Ademaj, Xhevat Berisha, Ismajl Kryeziu, and Ekrem Rexha.

With the formation of the special unit for rapid intervention, near the Vërrin headquarters, Shala was placed in charge of the special unit “Djemtë e Vërrinit,” in the logistics sector. Shala was ambushed twice, but crossed the border numerous times without injuries. On 7 July, he fought in the attack on Biluša, and defeated the Yugoslav troops there. Again on 16 July, he fought in the Battle of Tusus and Hoča Zagradska, where the Yugoslav forces were defeated. After these clashes, Shala helped in logistics in breaking the border with quick navigation.

On 1 September 1998, the Ministry of Internal Affairs (MUP) launched an offensive on the Vërrin region. On September 3, Agim Avdi Shala fell in bloody battles, after dressing the wounds of fellow soldier Besim Ryshen Shala.

== Legacy ==
In 2023, a statue of Agim Shala was built in front of the Prizren municipality.
