= Agim Çelaj =

Kosovar commander in the Kosovo Liberation Army (1961–1998)

- Born: 12 June 1961; Strellc, Pejë, Kosovo
- Died: 19 July 1998 (aged 37); Rahovec, Kosovo
- Military career
- Branch: Croatian Army (until 1993); Kosovo Liberation Army
- Service years: 1991–1998
- Rank: Commander
- Nickname: "Coli"
- Conflicts: Croatian War of Independence (until 1993): Kosovo War; Bllace Attack; Attack on Orahovac †
- Awards: Hero of Kosovo

Agim Çelaj (12 June 1961 – 19 July 1998) also known with nickname "Coli" was an Albanian commander of the Kosovo Liberation Army (KLA) during the Kosovo War, from the village of Strellc. He also served in the Croatian Army during the Croatian War of Independence.

== Biography ==
Agim Çelaj was an Albanian born on 12 June 1961 in the village of Strellc, Peja, to his parents Binak and Zylfie Çelaj. He started his military training in the military academy of Belgrade in 1980, completing it by 1982, before continuing his military training in Croatia. Upon the start of the Croatian War of Independence, Agim quickly joined the other Albanian volunteers in the Croatian Army. After 1993, he moved to North Macedonia where he remained for 2 years, awaiting an armed uprising in Gostivar, however he was tracked by the Yugoslav police and migrated to Germany.

With the spread of the KLA's popularity in 1998 after the Attack on Prekaz, Agim Çelaj, leading a group of 45 armed men and women entered Kosovo. He operated in the areas of Likoc, Açarevë, Negroc and Klečka and his group became known as the 121st "Kumanovo" brigade. On 25 June 1998, Agim Çelaj led an attack in Bllace together with Ismet Jashari where they destroyed a Yugoslav BOV.

=== Death ===
On 17 July 1998, Agim Ramadani together with twenty other soldiers were planning to attack Orahovac. After leading an initially successful attack, his army was repelled by a Yugoslav offensive, leading to his death on the 19th.

== Legacy ==
On 14 December 2016 Agim Çelaj received the Hero of Kosovo from former Kosovar president Atifete Jahjaga.
