= Stone Castle (Kosovan winery) =

Stone Castle Vineyards and Winery
- Company type: Private Company
- Industry: Winery; Alcoholic beverage
- Founded: 1952; 74 years ago
- Headquarters: Rahovec, Kosovë
- Area served: International
- Owner: Rrustem Gecaj
- Parent: Enterprise Stone Castle
- Website: stonecastlewine.com

Stone Castle Vineyards and Winery (Shqip: Vreshtat dhe Veraria e Stone Castle), or just Stone Castle, is a wine producing company in Rahovec, Kosovo since 1952. It is one of the largest private wineries in Europe. The company was privatized in 2006, with a purchase of 5.5 million euros. It is owned by the Albanian-American businessman Rrustem Gecaj. Stone Castle produces high-quality wines with a production capacity of 10 to 13 million liters and the capacity to process approximately 70,000 tons of grapes each summer. Exporting to Europe and beyond, including markets in Africa and the United States.

== See also ==
- Winery
