= Yugoslav September offensive =

Part of the Kosovo War

- Part of Kosovo war and Yugoslav counter-offensive in Kosovo (1998)
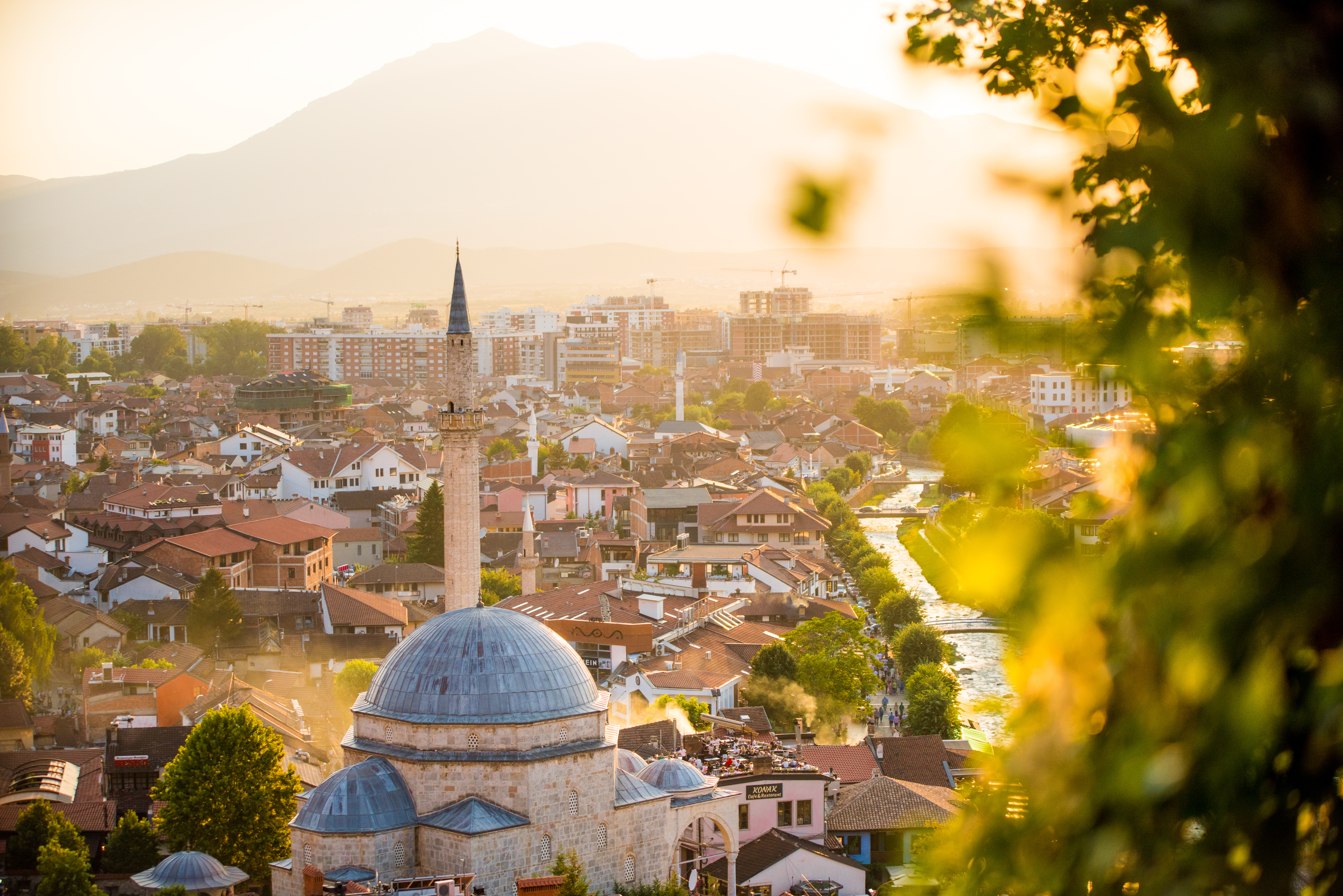
- Modern day Prizren, one of the places where September offensive began
Date	September 1998
Location	Kosovo, FR Yugoslavia
Result	Yugoslav victory: United Nations Security Council Resolution 1199; Ceasefire; KLA is almost completely destroyed
Territorial changes	Yugoslav forces captured Prilep, Lake Radonjić, Reznić, numerous villages in Drenica, multiple KLA-held areas in Prizren including their strongholds and other regions.

Belligerents
(Federal Republic of Yugoslavia) FR Yugoslavia	Kosovo Liberation Army

Commanders and leaders
(Federal Republic of Yugoslavia) Slobodan Milošević (Federal Republic of Yugoslavia) Božidar Delić (Federal Republic of Yugoslavia) Vlastimir Đorđević (Federal Republic of Yugoslavia) Stojan Konjikovac (Federal Republic of Yugoslavia) Milorad Ulemek (Federal Republic of Yugoslavia) Nebojša Pavković (Federal Republic of Yugoslavia) Frenki Simatović	Agim Ramadani; Ramush Haradinaj; Agim Çeku; Fehmi Lladrovci †; Agim Shala †; Selajdin Berisha †

Units involved
Yugoslav Army; Ground Army; 549th Prizren Motorized Brigade; Air Force and Air Defense; Serbian police; Special Anti-Terrorist Unit; Special Operations Unit; Russian volunteers Ukrainian volunteers	Kosovo Liberation Army; 125th brigade; 114th brigade; 112th brigade; 111th brigade; 131st brigade

Strength
Unknown	Unknown

Casualties and losses
Unknown	Heavy
- (Albania) 300 POW's (Albania) Thousands displaced

The Yugoslav September offensive was launched in September 1998 by the Yugoslav forces against the Kosovo Liberation Army (KLA) during the Kosovo War.

== Background ==
During the Kosovo War, the KLA launched an offensive against Yugoslav forces aiming to capture towns and expand their territory. During the offensive KLA captured around 40% of Kosovo and Metohija. To regain territories lost in the offensive, Yugoslav troops launched an offensive in mid July that lasted until the beginning of October. As a result, Yugoslav troops captured most of Kosovo, with some sources claiming they captured almost the whole of Kosovo. The September offensive was part of that counteroffensive and was launched on 1st September.

== Offensive ==
On the 1st of September, Yugoslav forces launched an offensive against KLA positions south of Prizren. One of the first places that was affected was the village of Lez, where after clashes between Yugoslav forces and KLA, the KLA was defeated and Yugoslav forces captured the village. The battle led to the deaths of 15 KLA soldiers, while Yugoslav forces suffered 2 wounded. The offensive led to capture of KLA stronghold and on the 5th of September Yugoslav forces forced Albanian villagers to surrender their weapons. The offensive also weakened the KLA's 125th Brigade. The KLA had 35 killed by the end of the offensive. On 9 September, Yugoslav forces launched an offensive and captured Prilep, Reznić, Dasinovac, Gložana and Lake Radonjić. British officer John Crossland who was present during the offensive said he personally witnessed Yugoslav soldiers looting Albanian houses. By mid-September the Yugoslav army succeeded in destroying towns and villages KLA was present forcing them to withdraw. However one of the important areas KLA still had presence remained unfinished, that being central Drenica. On the 13th September, the Yugoslav army recaptured Likovac which served as KLA regional headquarters. On 22 September, the Yugoslav forces launched an offensive in Central Drenica. One of the places the Yugoslav army attacked was Gladno Selo which was captured after several hours of fighting. KLA withdrew shortly after Fehmi Lladrovci and his wife were killed. Serbian police and army attacked from the direction of Klina, southwest of Glogovac, as well from the Cicavica mountains and effectively surrounded KLA forces in Obrinje region. According to KLA commander (who was also former Yugoslav army officer) Naim Maloku during an interview with New York Times, said that the Yugoslav army faced resistance from the KLA in Likovac-Obrinje area, saying that 47 Yugoslav soldiers and policemen were killed. According to the BBC, on September 24th the Yugoslav army captured at least 6 villages in central Drenica. At the beginning of the offensive, Yugoslav forces started shelling the Dlilaj compound from the direction of Likovac and on 26th September, it was shelled with various types of artillery and mortars. As a result, most of inhabitants fled to escape the shelling. For the next several days, Obrinje was under effective Yugoslav control and many abuses were carried out against Albanian population. JSO was also reported being present during the offensive, they were commanded by Franko Simatović often appearing in other military police units carrying large knives. There were reports by the local population seeing them near Obrinje. The JSO had a reputation of being ruthless. Serbian police officers who were with them for 6 months in Dečan, in interview with Human Rights Watch, they said: "Frenki's man kill everything. Believe me you don't want to see them". On 25th September, 5 Serbian police officers were killed by the detonation that was placed by the KLA. The KLA sometimes attacked the Serbian police and then retreated towards villages. This triggered serbian forces to commit massacre in Gorne Obrinje as retaliation on 26th September killing 21 civilians. On 27th September, HMW researchers and journalists arrived and documented the massacre that happened in the village, garnering attention from Western media.

== Aftermath ==
On 28th September the Serbian Prime Minister Mirko Marjanović gave a victory speech saying that the "terrorist gangs" (KLA) have been destroyed, showing how Serbia was once again capable to resolve their problems alone. Yugoslav army and police withdrew from Ostrozub, Klečka, Samodraža and other places due to international pressure and ceasefire. Ramush Haradinaj, operational zone commander of the KLA in Metohija stated that the offensive caused heavy losses for KLA and called the Holbrooke Agreement "life saving for the KLA". Agim Çeku, a member of the KLA General Staff has said, “the ceasefire was very useful for us".

== See also ==
- Operation Eagle Eye (1999)
- Gornje Obrinje massacre
- Central Drenica offensive
