= Battle of Orahovac =

Part of the Kosovo War

Attack on Orahovac
- Part of the Kosovo War
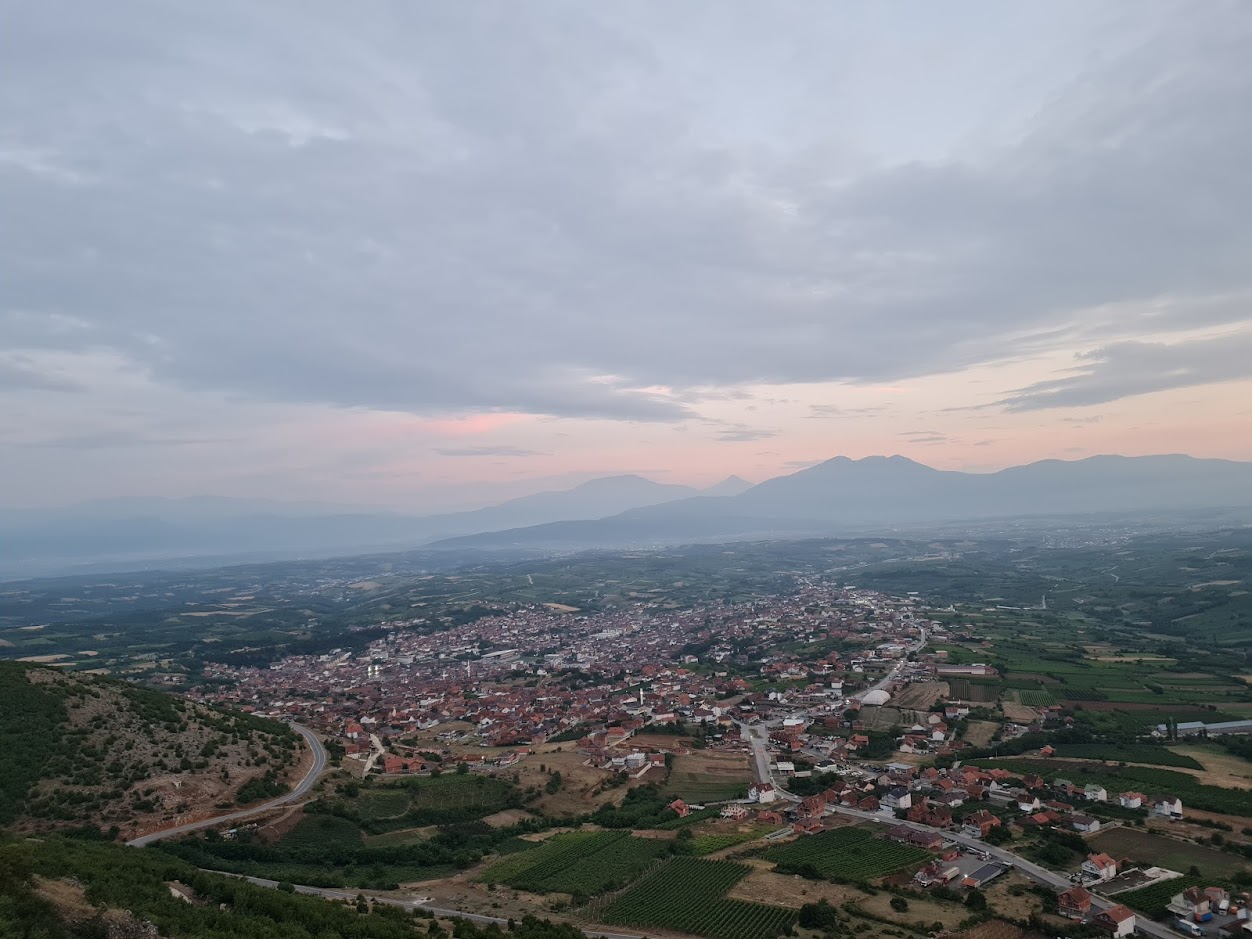
- View of Orahovac
Date	17–20 July 1998 (3 days)
Location	Orahovac, FR Yugoslavia (present-day Kosovo) 42°23′58″N 20°39′17″E
Result	Yugoslav victory: KLA withdrawal from Orahovac
Territorial changes	Yugoslavia regains control over Orahovac

Belligerents
FR Yugoslavia	Kosovo Liberation Army

Commanders and leaders
(Federal Republic of Yugoslavia) Veljko Radenović (Federal Republic of Yugoslavia) Božidar Delić	Agim Çelaj †; Ismet Tara; Bedri Muharemi (surrendered)

Units involved
Serbian Police; 549th Brigade	Kosovo Liberation Army; Pashtrik Operational Zone; 121st Brigade “Ismet Jashari”; 124th Brigade “Gani Paçarizi”

Strength
(Federal Republic of Yugoslavia) 400–500	c. 1,000

Casualties and losses
(Federal Republic of Yugoslavia) 2 killed, 1 wounded	3 killed
- 5 Serb and c. 48 or 58+ Albanian civilian deaths, 85 abductions of Serb civilians of which 40 were killed.
- Location within FR Yugoslavia

The attack on Orahovac was a three-day long clash in 17–20 July 1998 between the forces of the Kosovo Liberation Army (KLA) and the Ministry of Internal Affairs (MUP) relieved by the 549th Motorized Brigade of Prizren of the Yugoslav Army (VJ) in and around the town of Orahovac. The KLA surrounded Serb villages around the town intending to assert authority for the Kosovo Albanian provisional government through taking over a town and creating a corridor between the KLA hotbed in Drenica and the Albanian border region. The KLA offensive failed and they were pushed out of the region. An unclear number of KLA fighters and Albanian civilians were killed, ranging from 42 and upwards, while five Serb civilians and two policemen were killed. 85 Serb civilians were abducted in the area by the KLA, 40 of whom are presumed to have been murdered.

== Background ==
Between 17 and 20 July 1998 there was an armed conflict in Orahovac in western Kosovo between the Kosovo Liberation Army (KLA) and the Yugoslav police and army. This was KLA's first major offensive and also first attack on a city. Up until then the KLA had fought only in villages where it enjoyed strong support of locals. In late June, after setting up roadblocks around urban centres, the KLA controlled over 50% of Kosovo territory. The Yugoslav authorities concentrated on guarding the cities and towns and their communication links instead of attempting to counter the spreading of KLA. In order to assert authority for the Kosovo Albanian provisional government, the KLA needed to capture a town, and accordingly attacked Orahovac. It was very thoroughly prepared. There were no Yugoslav troops in Orahovac, while the population was 80% Albanian. Policemen used the large terrace of the local hotel to observe the surrounding hills. The KLA had in the preceding days deployed troops in nearby villages from their base at Mališevo. Some took the situation seriously, the mayor having spoke to daily Politika Ekspres about expecting a "major terrorist attack". Many locals had their women and children evacuated before the attack. The takeover would give the KLA major strategic advantage as it would form a corridor between Drenica (the KLA hotbed) and the Yugoslav–Albanian border region in the southwest. The KLA had the tactic of attacking and fleeing, inviting retaliation, and KLA leader Hashim Thaçi, who was also accused of ordering the "Orahovac fiasco", said that it was a "sacrifice that had to be made to secure NATO's intervention".

== Events ==
The attack began in the afternoon on Friday, 17 July, with simultaneous attacks on the town's strategic objects (police headquarters, post office, hospital, and hotel). The KLA entered the town from several directions, having set up in or near surrounding villages, and the attack was led by Gëzim Hamza, Abdullah Bugari and Mizahir Isma, and included the 121st “Kumanovo” Brigade and the Special Unit of the KLA General Staff under commander Agim Çelaj. The KLA numbered around 1,000 fighters. Electricity and water was cut off to the town. The besieged policemen were armed with light weaponry, while the KLA used artillery and machine guns. The fighting was most intense on 18 July, when police and Yugoslav Army reinforcements arrived to relieve the policemen in the town. There were 15 to 16 policemen besieged at the station, while 112 PJP members were in the hotel. By the time of the fighting, there were 400 to 500 policemen in the area. A BOV arrived in the morning to take the wounded. Beginning the counter-attack with mortars or light artillery from outside the town, troops entered the town and exchanged gunfire with KLA on 18 through 20 July. The army supported with helicopter guns and heavy armor while the KLA utilized hand-held anti-aircraft missiles. On 19 July, the Associated Press published a video of the fighting from the perspective of a group of KLA in the outskirts of the town. The Yugoslav forces expelled the KLA by 20 July, though isolated KLA sniper fire and grenade explosions continued into the next day.

The majority of inhabitants, some 13,000 to 15,000, fled the town during the fighting. 15 buildings had been destroyed and homes and shops had been looted. 2 police officers were killed. 5 Serb civilians were killed in Orahovac during the attack. The number of KLA combatants killed is uncertain; Serbian police claimed at least 51, while Serbian journalist Mirko Čupić claimed 60. KLA sources named 25 combatants killed in the attack.

The Serbian police counted 58 bodies, five of which were collected by family members, and had buried 51 bodies which they claimed were all KLA combatants. 40 of them were buried on the eastern edge of town next to a garbage dump. 11 were buried in Prizren. There were witness reports of up to 500 dead, but these claims are unsubstantiated. Amnesty International concluded in August 1998 that the number exceeded 58 and noted the figure frequently cited by ethnic Albanian sources as 200. Local organizations compiled lists of dead, numbering between 24–48 names. HRW (2001) estimated at least 42 deaths, but did not describe their occupation or ethnicity.

The KLA had been defeated, with considerable losses. They were later pushed out across Mališevo.

== War crimes ==
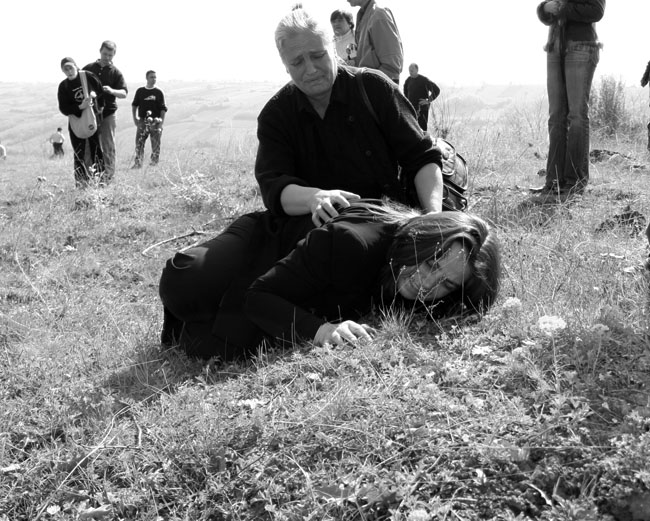
Relatives of murdered Serb abductees from villages Opteruša and Retimlje.

Simultaneously with the attack, the KLA attacked neighbouring Serb villages. Serb civilians were expelled from villages Opteruša and Retimlje. With light artillery and machine guns, the KLA attacked for 45 minutes the Zočište Monastery where thirty elderly Serbs had taken shelter, together with seven monks and a nun, and damaged the communal house with two grenades. Local Serbs told HRW that the monks resisted with four rifles for two hours before giving up. The KLA took everyone in the monastery to a school in nearby Semetište. Of the abducted Serbs, 35 were subsequently released unharmed on 22 July, and another ten on the night of 29–30 July. The KLA had abducted 85 ethnic Serbs during the Orahovac offensive. The fate of the other estimated forty abductees was unknown and they are presumed to have been murdered. In 2005 remains of 47 victims were excavated in two mass graves in Klina and Mališevo.

When journalists arrived in the afternoon of 21 July, they recorded that police and locals had cleared bodies in the streets, though some bodies remained in buildings and courtyards. The causes of death of these could not be determined as they were hastily buried without autopsy, however, some of them were KLA members. Amnesty International regarded allegations that Serbian forces had not distinguished between civilians and KLA as credible; there were allegations that troops shot at people who clearly were civilians. Associated Press videos following the KLA combatants during battle show them wearing both camouflage and civilian clothes. There were alleged extrajudicial killings around the Dervish tekke and Sunni mosque; extensive reports, although varying in detail, of Serbian police shooting at a group of people leaving the town in the morning of 20 July, in which several were killed. The fate of the bodies from this event is unknown. Although inconsistent testimonies, the baba of the tekke was reportedly executed in its courtyard and then buried by his son; four more bodies were found at the courtyard according to reports given to journalists.

== Aftermath and legacy ==
In response of the KLA offensive on Orahovac, a major offensive with armor and air support forced the KLA into the hills and abandon their territory. Tens of thousands of Albanians, together with KLA fighters, fled the military onslaught which devastated their villages. In the aftermath of the Orahovac battle, 325 Albanians were inquired by Serbian police; out of these, 52 "took part in terrorist attacks", according to an Interior Ministry spokesperson speaking on 5 August, but they were at that point not put at trial. There were reports that many of the detained had been mistreated or tortured. In February 1999 the trial of 24 members of the "Orahovac group" was postponed. Return of displaced in significant numbers started in mid-August 1998. On 21 August 1998 two Serbian journalists were abducted in Orahovac, and never found.

In the period of 1998–2001, the HLC lists 950 war-related deaths, murders and kidnappings from the Orahovac region, the overwhelming majority being Albanians.

Of Orahovac’s pre-war 5,200 Serb inhabitants, as of 2012 only 500 remain. In late 1998, Albanian extremists killed over 60 Serbs from the Serb villages in the area. The Zočište Monastery was destroyed on 13–14 September 1999. All of Zočište's 300 Serbs that lived there in June 1999 have left the village and their property seized by Albanians. Today, only three Serbian Orthodox monks remain, at the monastery. The return of 200 Serbs to 44 renovated houses in Zočište was stopped by the local Albanians some years ago. In Retimlje, Serbs' houses and lands are illegally used by Albanians, if not destroyed and abandoned, while the Orthodox church and graveyard are destroyed, a parking lot built at the place of the church. When a local Serb asked international organizations and the Office for Kosovo and Metohija (Serbian: Kancelarija za KiM) if there were plans on renovating houses in Retimlje and Opteruša in order for Serbs to return, it was said that there were no plans and that it was very risky. As of 2017, there is no Serb community in Zočište, Opteruša, Retimlje, Smać, Zojić, Mala Kruša, Donja Srbica and Gornja Srbica. A Serb enclave exists in Velika Hoča.

A religious memorial service for the abduction victims was held at the St. Prokopije Church in Belgrade in 2012. The Orahovac case was investigated by the ICTY but no charges were filed. It was then handed over to the UNMIK, and then EULEX, after which an investigation was launched in September 2010 that led to the arrest of two Kosovo Albanians in April 2011. The arrested however stand on trial for expelling non-Albanian civilians from Orahovac, and not killing civilians.

The attack on Orahovac formed part of the Kosovo Specialist Chambers' indictment against Hashim Thaçi, Kadri Veseli, Rexhep Selimi and Jakup Krasniqi who are accused of a joint criminal enterprise. At least 48 civilians, mostly Serbs, were detained at the police station in Mališevo following the attack and 25 Serbs were murdered near the Volujak cave on 27-27 July 1998.

A statue was erected in the town honoring local KLA members Xhelal Hajda-Toni and Selajdin Mullabazi-Mici, who however were not killed in this battle.

== Annotations ==
1. The KLA's strategical aim was to put the area on both sides of the Peć–Dečani–Đakovica road, along with the Albanian border, under their control in order to receive men and arms. They also sought to create a corridor on the Orahovac–Jablanica–Klina line in order to connect with formations in Drenica and also across Prizren with Opolje and Gora towards the Albanian border. They intended to control the whole of Metohija.
2. KLA sources name 25 "and many more", including Agim Binak Çelaj, Sadik Hafir Shala, Hamdi Sadri Berisha, Afrim Fazli Krasniqi, Liman Destan Gegaj, Habib Halil Berisha, Gani Xhemë Paçarizi, Tafil Zyberaj, Arian Xhemil Brahimi, Eshrefedin Rexhep Kastrati, Ruzhdi Xhemë Xhuliqi, Ramadan Morina, Bajram Hysen Veliu, Faik Hajredin Rama, Remzi Sadri Ukshini, Mizahir Jetullah Isma, Bekim Shaban Isma, Gëzim Fahredin Mullaabazi, Xhevat Ymer Kasapi, Samir Selim Nurkasa, Xhafer Zenel Nurkasa, Abdullah Zijajdin Bugari, Gëzim Salih Hamza-Piktori, Agim Veli Kelmendi, Shkelzim Halit Zllanoga. Another KLA death list includes these and also Jahir Shaban Mazreku, Selajdin A. Shabandulla.

== Sources ==
- Amnesty International (25 August 1998). "Orahovac July-August 1998". Amnesty International.
- Arsovska, Jana; Valiñas, Marta; Fellegi, Borbala (2013). "Prologue to the Kosovo drama: causes and consequences of a violent ethno-political conflict". Restoring Justice after Large-scale Violent Conflicts. Routledge. ISBN 978-1-134-00623-6.
- Bytyçi, Nuhi (2020). "Në 22 vjetorin e rënies së Gjeneralit të UÇK-së, kolosit të luftës çlirimtare, Agim Çelaj". Epoka Ere.
- Čupić, Mirko (2006). Oteta zemlja: Kosovo i Metohija. Nolit. ISBN 9788619023924.
- Galović, Milan (18 July 2022). "Официр на тајном задатку у епицентру битке за Ораховац". Politika.
- Harkavy, R.; Neuman, S. (2016-04-30). Warfare and the Third World. Springer. ISBN 978-1-137-07926-8.
- Jevtić, Đorđe (29 September 2002). "Orahovac – kobna greška". Novosti. (in Serbian)
- Kola, Paulin (2003). The Search for Greater Albania. Hurst & Company. pp. 340–341. ISBN 978-1-85065-664-7.
- Krieger, Heike (2001). The Kosovo Conflict and International Law: An Analytical Documentation 1974-1999. Cambridge University Press. p. 109. ISBN 978-0-521-80071-6.
- Latifi, Smajl (2023). "BETEJA PËR RAHOVECIN NJË NDËRMARRJE LEGJITIME E GUXIMSHME". Epoka Ere.
- Pavkovic, A. (2000). The Fragmentation of Yugoslavia: Nationalism and War in the Balkans. Springer. p. 191. ISBN 978-0-230-28584-2.
- Ristic, Marija (19 July 2012). "Belgrade Remembers Victims from Orahovac". balkaninsight.com. BIRN; Balkan Insight.
- Rudic, Filip (29 January 2019). "Could Kosovo Ex-Commander Reveal Fate of Missing Serbs?". Balkan Insight.

Veterani PJP (30 May 2020). "Bitka za Orahovac". Veterani PJP.

- "On the spot: The battle of Orahovac". tol.org. Prague: Transitions Online. 25 July 1998.
- "Potraga za braćom: "Pitala sam se koje kosti da poljubim"". B92. 2 November 2017.
- "Zaštićeni svedok na suđenju Tačiju o ubistvu 25 Srba u pećini Volujak i pritvoru u Mališevu". N1. 28 August 2024.
- Myrtaj, Nezir (2001). "Dëshmorët e Ushtrisë Çlirimtare të Kosovës" (PDF). Feniksët e lirisë.
