= Ekrem Rexha =

Kosovo Liberation Army commander

- Born: 14 August 1961; Lubizhdë, Prizren, SFR Yugoslavia, (today Kosovo)
- Died: 8 May 2000 (aged 38) near his house in Lubizhdë, Prizren, Kosovo
- Military career
- Allegiance: Kosovo Liberation Army; Albania; Armed Forces of the Republic of Kosova
- Service years: 1998–2000
- Rank: Commander
- Nickname: Komandant Drini
- Commands: Operational Zone of Pashtrik
- Conflicts: Kosovo War: Attacks on Hoçë e Qytetit; Offensive in Vërrin; Battle of Jeshkovë; Attack on Zoçishtë (1999); Battle of Kabash and Korishë; Battle of Pashtrik
- Awards: Hero of Kosovo (posthumously)

Ekrem Rexha (14 August 1961 – 8 May 2000) was a prominent commander of the Kosovo Liberation Army and political figure, who was killed under suspicious circumstances as part of a killing series in the early 2000s.

== Early life ==
Ekrem Rexha was born on August 14, 1961, in the village of Lubizhdë, Prizren. He completed his primary education and secondary school in Prizren. He was always known as a smart person as he spoke 7 languages and had a degree in Political science.

== Military career ==
=== Service in the Yugoslav People's Army ===
After graduating from the Yugoslav Military Academy he became a professional officer of the JNA and taught at the military academy in Sarajevo until 1993, when he was demobilized due to the escalating Civil War in Yugoslavia. During his time at the military academy he achieved high qualifications, including a master's degree in international political studies and learning up to seven languages.

=== Joining the KLA during the Kosovo War ===
In early 1998, driven by the escalating conflict in Kosovo, Rexha sought connections with other former JNA Albanian officers and upon his return to Prizren, Rexha immediately joined the Kosovo Liberation Army in May 1998. His involvement was motivated by a deep commitment to the independence of Kosovo, reinforced by the violent events of the Likoshan massacre and the Jashari family massacre.

Rexha was soon appointed commander of the Vërrini region and succeeded in recruiting several locals for the KLA. After leading the KLA forces in the Battle of Vërrin, Rexha organized a mission to Albania, where he helped train new fighters and smuggle weapons for the KLA. In December 1998, he was appointed commander of the Pashtrik Operational Zone. Rexha also served as the director of the KLA's Military School and Doctrine in Albania, a role in which he trained high-ranking KLA personnel until the war's end.

When the war ended, Ekrem Rexha secured the release of many Serbs and appealed to convoys of departing Serb civilians leaving Prizren to go to Serbia telling them "Don't go. There's no need for you to go. Stay at the seminary for a few more days. The situation is a bit tense right now but it will be alright soon".

== Political career ==
After the war Rexha transitioned to a civilian role as the director of environment and safety for the Prizren Municipality with his degree in Political science, even though he expressed dissatisfaction with the post-war agreement that outlined the transformation of the KLA into a civilian entity.

Among the KFOR and UNMIK, Rexha was considered as the most important partner in the Region of Prizren and most cooperative KLA-Commander, due to his moderate political views. His willingness to cooperate with the international community and the fact that Rexha worked for the reconciliation of Albanians and Serbs, made him a target of hatred for many of his former war comrades. Regardless of his declining popularity among Albanians, Rexha had the biggest chances to win next mayoral elections in Prizren.

He was a known moderate of the Democratic League of Kosovo and was opposed to Hashim Thaçi. This led some to assume that Thaçi was behind the "political murder." A few months after his death, the 2000 Kosovan local elections were held, and during the campaigns, one UN official stated that if Ekrem Rexha was alive and ran for Mayor, he would've for sure won.

He also played a vital role in establishing the KLA Veterans Association and began preparing for his doctoral studies in Canada.

== Death ==
On the morning of 8 May 2000, Ekrem Rexha was shot and killed in front of his house in Prizren. At approximately 8:15 a.m., as Rexha prepared to leave for work and recognized a flat tire on his car, an unknown individual approached him and fired multiple shots at close range from a Kalashnikov, striking him eight times in the body and once in the head, after Rexha collapsed in the street. After the execution, according to the United Nations police, the assassin escaped from the scene in a car with no licence plates.

His death and the following serial assassinations and suspicious deaths of former key-figures of the KLA, like Tahir Zemaj or Besim Mala in the early 2000s after the Kosovo War, remain an unsolved enigma in the early history of Kosovo under International Administration.

=== Investigations ===
In order to clarify his murder, under the direction of the International Administration, two court proceedings were held in Prizren, but due to lack of evidence, the accused former members of the KLA and friends of "Drini", were released.

The process to solve the murder was later moved to higher courts in Pristina, where in another process a former war comrade, named Sali Veseli, who held the rank of General in the Kosovo Protection Corps, was accused of complicity in the murder. In first instance, the court in Pristina, found the accused guilty and sentenced him to 10 years in prison on March 24, 2003. On February 27, 2004, the Supreme Court of Kosovo, led by UNMIK judges, in the absence of evidence, cleared Veseli from all charges and later released him.

== Legacy ==
His death caused a public grief, with thousands of people and former KLA comrades expressing their sorrow and anger. All businesses in his hometown were temporarily closed and nearly 50,000 thousand people gathered to mourn his passing. His funeral was conducted with high military honors, such as a gun salute and a speech by KPC Commander Agim Çeku, who together with fellow KLA commander and close friend of Rexha Ramush Haradinaj, honoured his contributions in the Kosovo War.

In recognition of his contributions, the former president of Kosovo, Hashim Thaçi, awarded Rexha posthumously with the title "Hero of Kosovo" and the Presidential Jubilee Medal for Independence. The awards were given to his wife Hajrije, who witnessed the murder of her man and was then seven months pregnant with their second child and his two sons, Ekrem and Drini, who received the awards on his behalf.

In 2018, the Municipality of Prizren, announced plans to establish a Memorial Complex dedicated to Ekrem Rexha. The complex will be located in front of a house named the “White House” and within a park near its entrance.

In 2024, the current President of Kosovo, Vjosa Osmani described Rexha as a loyal patriot who commitment to the ideals of freedom and statehood of Kosovo. Osmani also acknowledged that Rexha's work was instrumental in making Kosovo's freedom a reality.
