= Jeshkova =

Jeshkova: Jeshkova/Jeshkovë (Albanian); Јешково/Ješkovo (Serbian)
- Village
- Interactive map of Jeshkova
- Location: Kosovo
- District: Prizren
- Municipality: Prizren
- Established: 1348
- Elevation: 832 m (2,730 ft)

Population (2024)
  - Total: 164
- Time zone: UTC+1 (CET)
  - Summer (DST): UTC+2 (CEST)

Jeshkova (Albanian indefinite form: Jeshkovë; Serbian: Јешково, Ješkovo) is a village in the District of Prizren, Kosovo.

== History ==
A document from 1348 mentions the settlement. In 1530, the settlement was documented by an Ottoman register, under the name of Jeshkova, with 18 households.

During the Kosovo War, Jeshkova was a Kosovo Liberation Army (KLA) base, from 7 July 1998. The 125th Brigade operated in the village, with Agim Shala being the leader of the unit in Jeshkovë. The village was the site of a Yugoslav government offensive, from 1 through 5 September 1998. By 5 September, the fighting concluded, in which the KLA, along with Albanian villagers, surrendered their weapons.

On 11 March 1999, the Battle of Ješkovo occurred. The Yugoslav Army (VJ) along with the Ministry of Internal Affairs (MUP) launched a joint operation to retake the village, infiltrated by the KLA a week prior. By then, the village was reported as “deserted” by the Organization for Security and Co-operation in Europe (OSCE) monitors. The KLA reported that there was four families residing in Jeshkova, but were evacuated days before the fighting. The fighting concluded when the VJ/MUP established control of the village in the evening.
