= Ali Sokoli =

Ali Sokol (8 May 1921 - 23 September 1974) was a Kosovar Albanian pulmonologist.

He completed his education in the Medrese of Skoplje from 1933 until 1941. He then enrolled in the Faculty of Agriculture at the University of Pisa in Italy. In 1943, during World War II, he returned to his hometown of Rahovec in Kosovo, Yugoslavia which was Axis-occupied. For a few months, he was mayor of the municipality of Xërxë. In 1944-45, Sokoli enrolled as a student at the Faculty of Agronomy at the University of Vienna, in Austria, where he attended lectures for three semesters before furthering his studies at the University of Belgrade's Faculty of Medecine, graduating in 1951 and finishing with a specialization in 1955.

He started his professional work in 1956 in Prizren, and also temporarily worked in Gjakova. Beginning in 1959 he practiced at the Lung Disease Clinic in Pristina. He died on 23 September 1974.

A secondary medical school in Pristina bears his name.
