= Prizrenac =

Prizrenac may refer to:

- Prizrenac (fortress), a fortress southwest of Novo Brdo
- Prizrenac (Bistrički), a fortress southwest of Prizren, also known as Višegrad

== See also ==
- Prizren Fortress
