= Henry H. Perritt Jr. =

American lawyer, engineer, and academic

- Occupations: Lawyer, engineer, academic, and author

Academic background
- Education: B.S., aeronautical engineering M.S., management JD
- Alma mater: Massachusetts Institute of Technology; Georgetown University Law Center

Academic work
- Institutions: Illinois Institute of Technology

Henry (Hank) H. Perritt Jr. (born 1944) is an American lawyer, engineer, academic, and author. He is an emeritus professor of law at the Illinois Institute of Technology.

Perritt is best known for his contributions to employment law and technology law through his books and law review articles. His notable works include Employee Dismissal: Law and Practice, Digital Communications Law, and Kosovo Liberation Army: The Inside Story of an Insurgency.

== Education ==
Perritt completed his Bachelor of Science in aeronautical engineering from Massachusetts Institute of Technology in 1966, followed by a Master of Science in management from the same institution in 1970. Later, in 1975, he obtained a J.D. degree from Georgetown University Law Center.

== Career ==
Perritt began his academic career at Villanova University in 1981 as a professor of law, serving until 1997. During his time there, he authored Employee Dismissal Law and Practice, which crystallized the common law of wrongful employment termination. While at Villanova, he taught a course on "Artificial Intelligence and Legal Reasoning". According to the Association of American Law Schools' Directory of Law Teachers, Perritt was the first professor to teach a course in artificial intelligence at any American law school. In 1997, he joined the Illinois Institute of Technology, where he served as a professor of law until 2020. Since 2020, he has been an emeritus professor of law at the Illinois Institute of Technology.

From 1997 to 2002, he was Dean at Chicago-Kent College of Law and Vice President-Downtown Campus at the Illinois Institute of Technology. He also served as the vice provost at the same institution in 2003.

Perritt began his professional career as an applications engineer and sales planner at the Lockheed Aircraft Corporation, from 1968 to 1971. Between 1972 and 1974, he served as the Executive Secretary at the Cost of Living Council within the Executive Office of the President. During the Ford administration, between 1975 and 1976, he held roles on the White House staff and served as the deputy undersecretary of labor. In 2001, he took on the role of secretary for the American Bar Association's Section on Labor and Employment Law. He contributed on telecommunications matters during President Clinton's Transition Team, advised the incoming Clinton Administration on its policy toward the Internet and shaped policy-maker and practicing lawyer understandings of how legal concepts such as judicial-jurisdiction and contract-formation should be applied to participants in the Internet and to electronic commerce. He served on the National Research Council's Computer Science and Telecommunications Policy Board and a committee addressing "Global Networks and Local Values." In this capacity, he was involved in shaping national technology policies. His contributions to the law review literature and his book, Law and the Information Superhighway, influenced the adaptation of copyright law to music and video entertainment distributed through the Internet. As the Dean of Chicago-Kent, he oversaw groups of law students involved in post-conflict reconstruction efforts in Bosnia and Kosovo. His contributions included aiding in the formation of contemporary political parties in Kosovo and authoring two books that detailed the guerrilla war in the country and its journey to independence. Additionally, he is a member of the Council on Foreign Relations and served on the board of directors for the Chicago Council on Foreign Relations. He participated in public service by taking on leadership roles in mayoral campaigns in Boston and Atlanta, as well as various state and local elections in Georgia and Illinois. In 2002, he represented the Democratic party as their candidate for the U.S. Congress in Illinois's Tenth District. Additionally, he gained prominence as a vocal opponent of the Bush Administration's decision to initiate a war in Iraq.

== Works ==
Perritt has authored more than 17 books. His book Digital Communications Law addressed a wide range of legal topics impacting online sales and communication, encompassing taxation, copyright, civil litigation, patents, international communication, and cross-border commerce. In his book titled Employee Dismissal: Law and Practice, he offered an in-depth examination of employee dismissal law and its practical applications, encompassing various areas such as employment at will, statutory safeguards, arbitration, contract and tort theories, while providing valuable insights into the field.

Perritt has also written two books on Kosovo. One of these books, titled Kosovo Liberation Army: The Inside Story of an Insurgency, provided a historical context and firsthand perspective on the Kosovo Liberation Army (KLA) insurgency, emphasizing the factors behind its success, such as aligning with Eastern European politics, garnering domestic and international support, and engaging in peace negotiations. Andrew Baruch Wachtel reviewed the book and said "There is no one else capable of writing a book about any modern insurgency that would combine this kind of insider's knowledge with such an acute appreciation for all the external factors surrounding the struggle". Moreover, his 2010 publication titled The Road to Independence for Kosovo: A Chronicle of the Ahtisaari Plan provided a thorough examination of Kosovo's journey towards independence, encompassing its historical, political, and geopolitical dimensions including the role of Ahtisaari Plan in Kosovo's path to independence, and offered valuable perspectives on the intricacies of the conflict and the negotiation process.

Perritt has written and produced three plays, including the musical, You Took Away My Flag: A Musical About Kosovo. He held an appointment as the vice president as well as the member of the board of directors at The Artistic Home theatre company in Chicago from 2011 to 2013. Since 2009, he is a producer and managing member at Modofac Productions. He has published eight novels as well, each of which revolves around gay-themed adventures. Some of his notable novels include Arian, Snaring Skips, Selling Dodge City, and Manifest Destiny. In addition to his novels, he has authored more than a hundred law review articles and 25 books.

== Research ==
Perritt has authored numerous law review articles and books on international relations and law, technology and law, employment law, and entertainment law. In his initial studies, he examined the legal aspects related to the Nixon Administration, particularly focusing on collective refusals to engage with gasoline station owners and the potential challenges posed by the Federal Advisory Committee Act to maintaining the privacy of negotiations within interest groups. In 1980, he analyzed secondary picketing under current U.S. labor policy, suggesting that by aligning the Railway Labor Act and the Labor-Management Relations Act and asserting the neutral employer's freedom from secondary picketing, a federal court can grant appropriate remedies to uphold this right. Expanding on the wrongful dismissal legislation in 1987, his study recommended exploring non-judicial dispute resolution alternatives, citing an annual caseload of 30,000 to 103,000 cases in the courts.

Perritt's 1992 research addressed the potential conflict between the need for unrestricted digital access and the legal and constitutional implications that may arise in doing so, and explored the complexities and challenges of balancing free expression and legal liability in the digital age, where network intermediaries play a pivotal role in information dissemination. He also examined the benefits of video technology for the litigation process and demonstrated that video technology enhances the litigation process by facilitating seamless information transfer from pre-trial to trial events, thereby enabling remote fact-finding hearings and trials.

Perritt's involvement in the entertainment sector, extended to numerous law review articles discussing the future of both the music industry and video entertainment. Concentrating his research efforts on copyright law in the music industry, he contended that copyright law, influenced by technological changes, should primarily incentivize creativity, curb free riding, and letting market forces and technology shape the music industry, as disruptive advancements diminish the relevance of traditional copyright protection and major record labels.

Perritt underscored the significance of electronic freedom of information and helped draft the EFOIA Amendments to advance transparency and ease of access to government information. In 2002, he suggested a foreign policy strategy for the United States that involved engaging with countries vulnerable to terrorism through civil society development, rule of law, and economic openness, while also advocating for military preparedness within a multilateral framework to address actual threats.

Perritt wrote over a dozen articles for magazines and law reviews, including a notable work in which he helped shape the FAA's drone rule, concluding that it strikes a balanced approach for regulating microdrones, with a preference for performance-based limitations over traditional aviation regulations, taking into account the market's existing encouragement of responsible drone features and the availability of private remedies for irresponsible operations. His recent articles, on technology and law, including "Don't Burn the Looms: Regulation of Uber and other gig labor markets"; "The 21st century cowboy: Robots on the range"; "Robots as Pirates"; "Robot Job Destroyer" and "Defending Face-Recognition Technology (And Defending Against It)"; explore the impact of post-Internet technologies on labor markets, policing, and copyright.

== Bibliography ==
=== Books ===
- Employee Dismissal: Law and Practice (1999) ISBN 978-0735511507
- Kosovo Liberation Army: The Inside Story of an Insurgency (2008) ISBN 9780252033421
- Digital Communications Law (2021) ISBN 9780735593213

=== Selected articles ===
- Perritt Jr, H. H. (1992) Tort Liability, the First Amendment, and Equal Access to Electronic Networks, HARV.J.LAW & TECH., 5, 65.
- PerrittPerritt Jr, H. H. (1996). Jurisdiction in cyberspace. Vill. L. Rev., 41, 1.
- Perritt Jr, H. H.(2001) Towards a Hybrid Regulatory Scheme for the Internet, U. CHI. LEGAL F., 2001, 215.
- Perritt Jr, H. H. (2007) New architectures for music: Law Should Get Out of the Way, 29 HASTINGS COMM. & ENT. L. J., 29, 259
- Perritt Jr, H. H. (2012) The Internet at 20: Evolution of a Constitution for Cyberspace, WILLIAM & MARY BILL OF RIGHTS J. 20, 1115.
