= Samidin Xhezairi-Hoxha =

Kosovo Liberation Army commander

Samidin Xhezairi
- Born: March 23, 1963 (age 63); Bresane,Opoja, Dragash, Kosovo
- Military career
- Allegiance: Kosovo Liberation Army; National Liberation Army
- Service years: 1990s–2001
- Rank: Chief of Staff and Commander
- Nickname: Commander Hoxha
- Units: 125th Brigade; Brigade 127,Dragash; * 112th Mujahideen Brigade/Mujdin Aliu brigade
- Conflicts: Soviet–Afghan War; First Chechen War; Kosovo War: Battle of Junik; Battles of Ješkovo; Vërrini conflict; 2001 insurgency in Macedonia: Battle of Tetovo; Operation MH
- Other work: Medical technician, KLA veterans association member

Samidin Xhezairi (born 1963), also known by his nom de guerre Commander Hoxha, is a former commander of the Kosovo Liberation Army (KLA). Born in Opoja, Dragash, Kosovo, he became involved in various international conflicts before and during the Kosovo War.

== Early life ==
Samidin Xhezairi, known during the war as Commander Hoxha, was born on March 23, 1963, in the village of Bresanë, Opoja. In 1969, his family relocated to Prizren, where he completed both primary and secondary education, focusing on medicine.

He fulfilled his compulsory military service in Pirot during 1982–1983. Between 1983 and 1988, he pursued studies at the Faculty of Technology in Mitrovica. During his final two years, he also attended the Higher School of Electrotechnics in Zveçan.

After graduating from both institutions, Samidin emigrated to Vienna, Austria, against his will. From 1988 to 1990, he worked various jobs while learning German. Between 1990 and 1998, he worked as a medical technician in a Viennese hospital. In 1993, he became an Austrian citizen.

Alongside his medical work, he studied C++ visual programming and graphic animation. Samidin married in Vienna, had two sons, and later, after the war, welcomed a daughter in Kosovo.

When the war in Kosovo began, he left behind his life in Austria and joined the Kosovo Liberation Army (KLA) to fight for Kosovo's independence.

== Military career ==
During the Kosovo War, Xhezairi served as the chief of staff for the 125th Brigade of the KLA, which operated in the Prizren region. He also later formed and led the 127th Brigade in the Dragash region.

He is reported to have participated in the Soviet–Afghan War, the First Chechen War, and later the 2001 insurgency in Macedonia. In Macedonia, he commanded the 112th “Mujdin Aliu” Brigade, which operated in the Tetovo region. The brigade was often referred to as a "Mujdin Aliu Brigade".

== Intelligence links ==
Xhezairi has been linked with multiple intelligence services including the BND (Germany), CIA, and Austrian intelligence. He was reportedly a BND informant and acted as an intermediary between alleged Al-Qaeda connections and the KLA. While he denied any direct ties to Al-Qaeda and intelligence services, he admitted in interviews to working with the BND, describing it as a form of "entertainment." In discussions with German reporters, he reportedly insisted that their reports be approved by the BND prior to publication.

== Specialist Chambers ==
In November 2019, Xhezairi was invited for questioning by the Kosovo Specialist Chambers in The Hague. The prosecution was investigating crimes allegedly committed by KLA members from early 1998 to the end of 1999, including killings, abductions, illegal detentions, and sexual violence. Xhezairi was not found guilty of any charges.

== Post-war activity ==
After the war, Xhezairi became a member of the KLA Veterans Association. During the 2004 unrest in Kosovo, he led demonstrations in Ferizaj, which were characterized by anti-Serbian and Islamist sentiments. He was supported by figures such as Imam Ekrem Avdiu, founder of the Abu Bakr Sadik Unit (a mujahideen unit in the Drenica region), and Imam Mazllum Mazllumi, a former KLA soldier later arrested for Islamist activities. Post-war he worked for the KLA veterans association living in Prizren.
