= Veljko Radenović =

Serbian general (1955–2012)

Lieutenant Colonel Veljko Radenović
- Born: 17 May 1955; Brezanik near Peć, Kosovo, SFR Yugoslavia
- Died: 29 September 2012 (aged 57); Kruševac, Serbia
- Military career
- Service years: until 2005
- Rank: Lieutenant Colonel
- Units: Police station in Sredska; Special Unit of MUP of Yugoslavia; Special Police Unit of Prizren
- Conflicts: Bosnian War: Kosovo War; Attack on Orahovac; Ješkovo clash
- Awards

Veljko Radenović (Serbian Cyrillic: Вељко Раденовић; 17 May 1955 – 29 September 2012) was a Serbian police lieutenant colonel.

== Biography ==
In the war he led his unit in clashes with the Kosovo Liberation Army. His unit participated in the 1998 Attack on Orahovac where they successfully defended the town. The Kosovo Liberation Army blockaded the local Serbian population for several days. Radenović led his unit in the attack that ended the siege.

== Decorations ==
- Order of Merit of the First Order (Posthumously).
- Order of Merit of the First Order in the field of Defense and Security (Posthumously).

== In popular culture ==
In his honor Gavrilo Kujundžić wrote the song "Đenerale, đenerale" originally performed by Ivana Žigon and Kosovski Božuri.
