= Prizren District (Serbia) =

Administrative district of Serbia on the territory of Kosovo

Prizrenski okrug Призренски округ
- Administrative district of Serbia
- Location of Prizren District
- Country: Serbia
- Province: Kosovo and Metohija
- Administrative center: Prizren

Area
  - Total: 1,902 km^{2} (734 sq mi)
- ISO 3166 code: RS-27
- Municipalities: 5

The Prizren District (Serbian: Призренски округ, romanized: Prizrenski okrug, pronounced [prîzrenskiː ôkruːɡ]) was administrative district of Serbia between 1992 and the end of the Kosovo War in 1999. The administrative center of the Prizren District was the city of Prizren. From the Serbian state official point of view, the district continues to be part of Serbia.

== Cities and municipalities ==
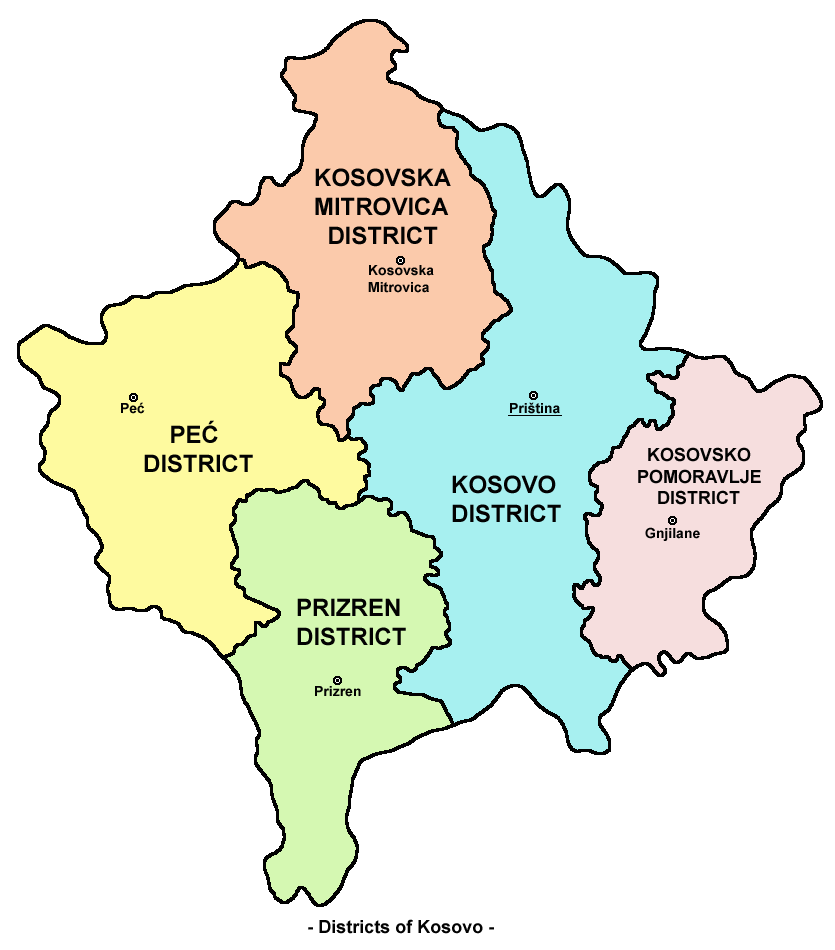
Map of administrative districts of Serbia on the territory of Kosovo

The Prizren District encompassed the territories of four municipalities:

- Gora (municipality)
- Orahovac (municipality)
- Prizren (municipality)
- Suva Reka (municipality)
