= Hoçë e Qytetit =

Hoçë e Qytetit: Hoçë e Qytetit (Albanian); Хоча Заградска/Hoča Zagradska (Serbian)
- Village
- Location within Kosovo
- Coordinates: 42.174875°N 20.690192°E
- Location: Kosovo
- District: Prizren
- Municipality: Prizren
- Elevation: 548 m (1,798 ft)

Population (2024)
  - Total: 1,480
- Time zone: UTC+1 (CET)
  - Summer (DST): UTC+2 (CEST)

Hoçë e Qytetit (Albanian: Hoçë e Qytetit, Serbian Cyrillic: Хоча Заградска/Hoča Zagradska) is a village in Prizren municipality, Kosovo.
