= Rahovec =

Town and municipality in Kosovo

Rahovec: Rahovec or Rahoveci (Albanian) Orahovac or Ораховац (Serbian)
- Town and municipality
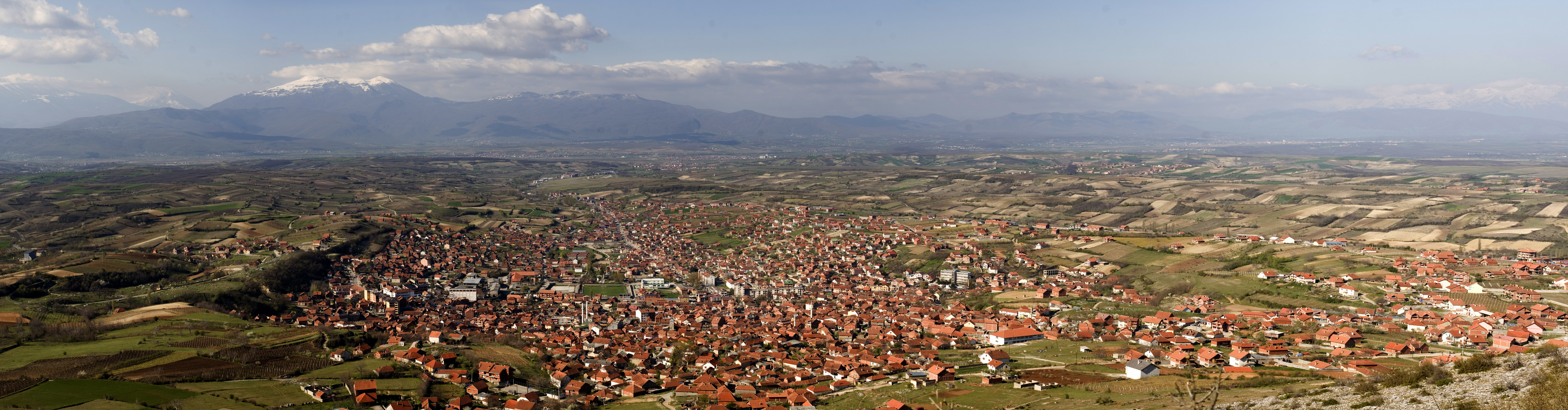
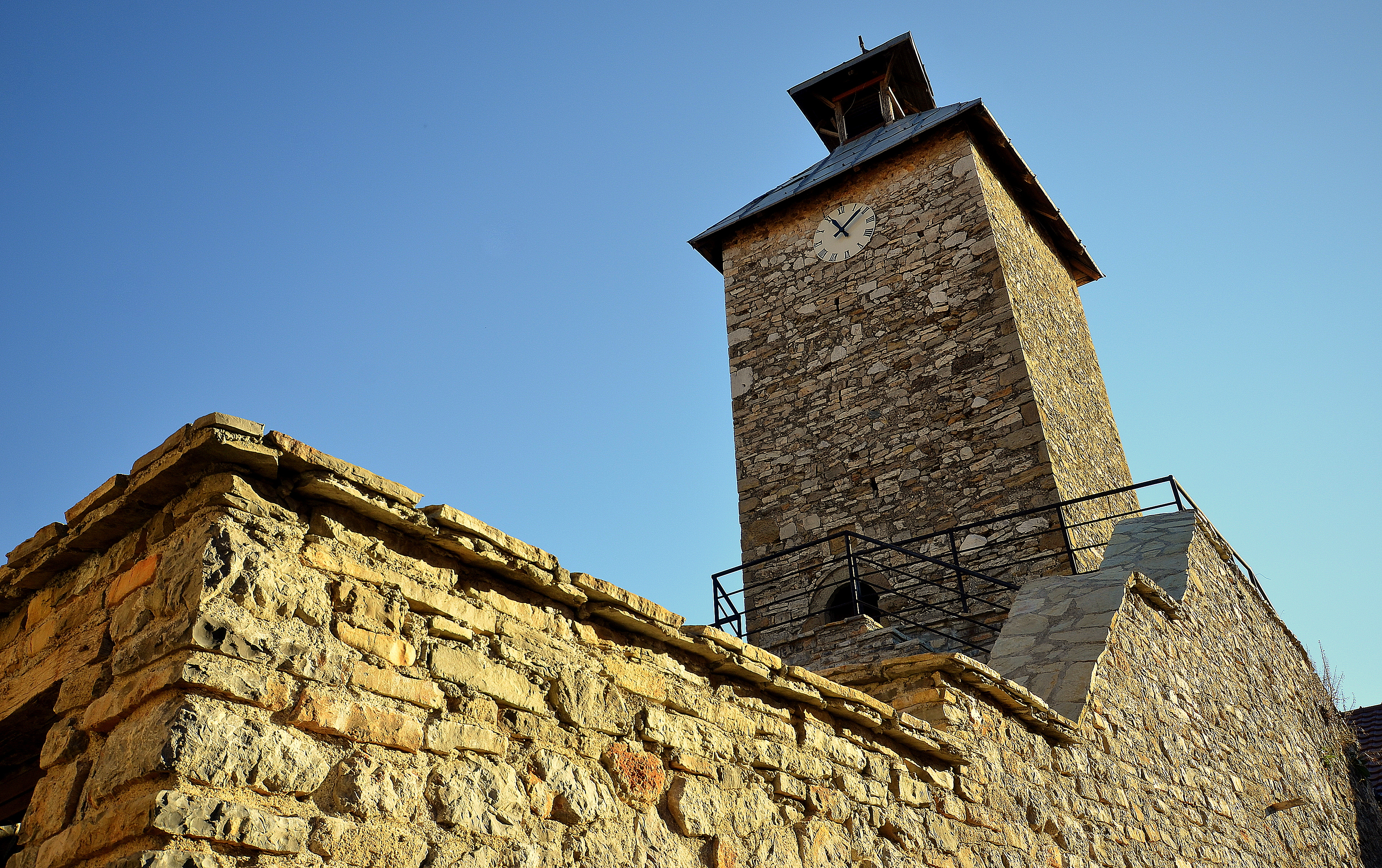
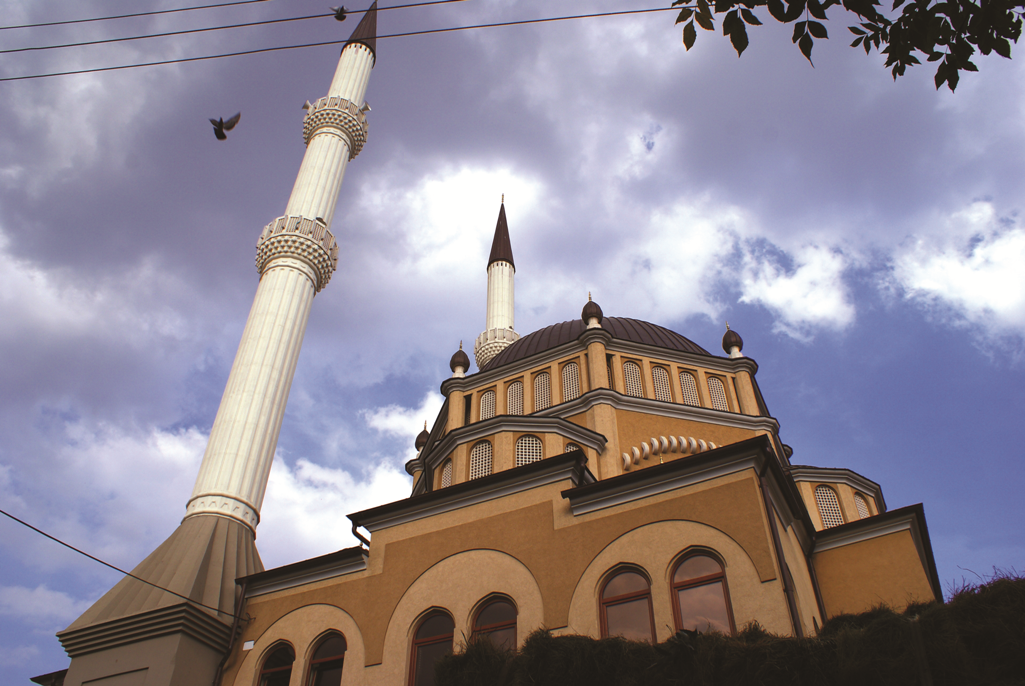
- Panorama of Rahovec Rahovec Clocktower Xhamia e Sokolit

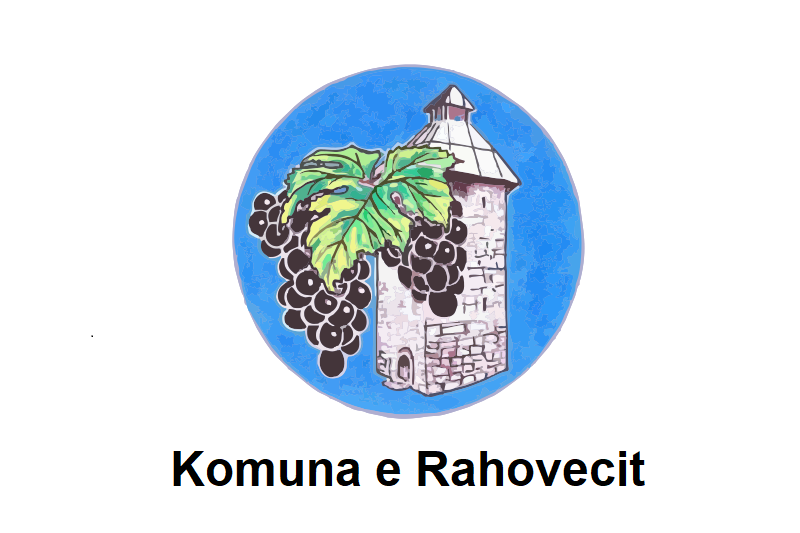
- Flag Emblem
- Interactive map of Rahovec
- Location within Kosovo
- Coordinates: 42°23′58″N 20°39′17″E
- Country: Kosovo
- District: District of Gjakova

Government
  - Mayor: Smajl Latifi (AAK)

Area
  - Municipal: 278 km^{2} (107 sq mi)
  - Rank: 21st in Kosovo
- Elevation: 477 m (1,565 ft)

Population (2024)
  - Municipal: 41,799
  - Density: 150/km^{2} (389/sq mi)
  - Urban: 13,642
  - Ethnicity: 96.87% Albanians; 3.13% Other
- Time zone: UTC+1 (CET)
  - Summer (DST): UTC+2 (CEST)
- Postal code: 21000
- Area code: +383 29
- Vehicle registration: 07
- Website: kk.rks-gov.net/rahovec

Rahovec (Albanian definite form: Rahoveci) or Orahovac (Serbian Cyrillic: Ораховац), is a town and municipality located in the District of Gjakova in Kosovo. According to the 2024 census, the town of Rahovec has 13,642 inhabitants, while the municipality has 41,799 inhabitants. It is also the center of the sports clubs KF Rahoveci, KB Rahoveci and KH Rahoveci.

== History ==
During the Kosovo War, the town was the site of a clash between the Yugoslav Army (VJ) and Kosovo Liberation Army (KLA) militants in July 1998. 85 Serb civilians were abducted by the KLA, 40 of whom were not released and are presumed to have been killed.

== Etymology ==
The name of the town and municipality is of Serbian origin and is derived from the Proto-Slavic word orěhъ, meaning 'nut'. The name Rahovec comes from an Albanised pronunciation of Orahovac.

== Geography ==
Rahovec is located in southwestern Kosovo and is part of the district of Gjakova. To the north, it shortly borders Klina, to the northeast Malisheva, to the southeast Suhareka and Mamusha, to the south Prizren, and to the west Gjakova. The distance from the capital city of Kosovo, Prishtina, is approximately 60 km (37 mi). The municipality covers an area of approximately 276 km^{2} (107 sq mi) and it includes 35 villages.

== Demographics ==
Municipal historical population
Year	Pop.	±% p.a.
1948	27,335	—
1953	30,095	+1.94%
1961	35,461	+2.07%
1971	46,788	+2.81%
1981	61,178	+2.72%
1991	85,698	+3.43%
2011	56,208	−2.09%
2024	41,799	−2.25%
Source: ASK Data

According to the last census of 2024 of Kosovo Agency of Statistics, the municipality of Rahovec has 41,799 while the town in itself has 13,642 inhabitants.

Of the 41,799 inhabitants, 40,491 (96.87%) are Albanians and other ethnicities mostly include Serbs and other ethnic groups.

== Language ==
The town was known for a language known locally as Rahovecionshe or Raveqki, which is a mixture of Albanian and Torlakian. Its use has declined rapidly after the Kosovo War and nowadays it is nearly extinct. It is thought that this pidgin language developed as a way for Albanian grape farmers to sell their products to wine producers, who were predominately Slavic-speaking.

== Economy ==
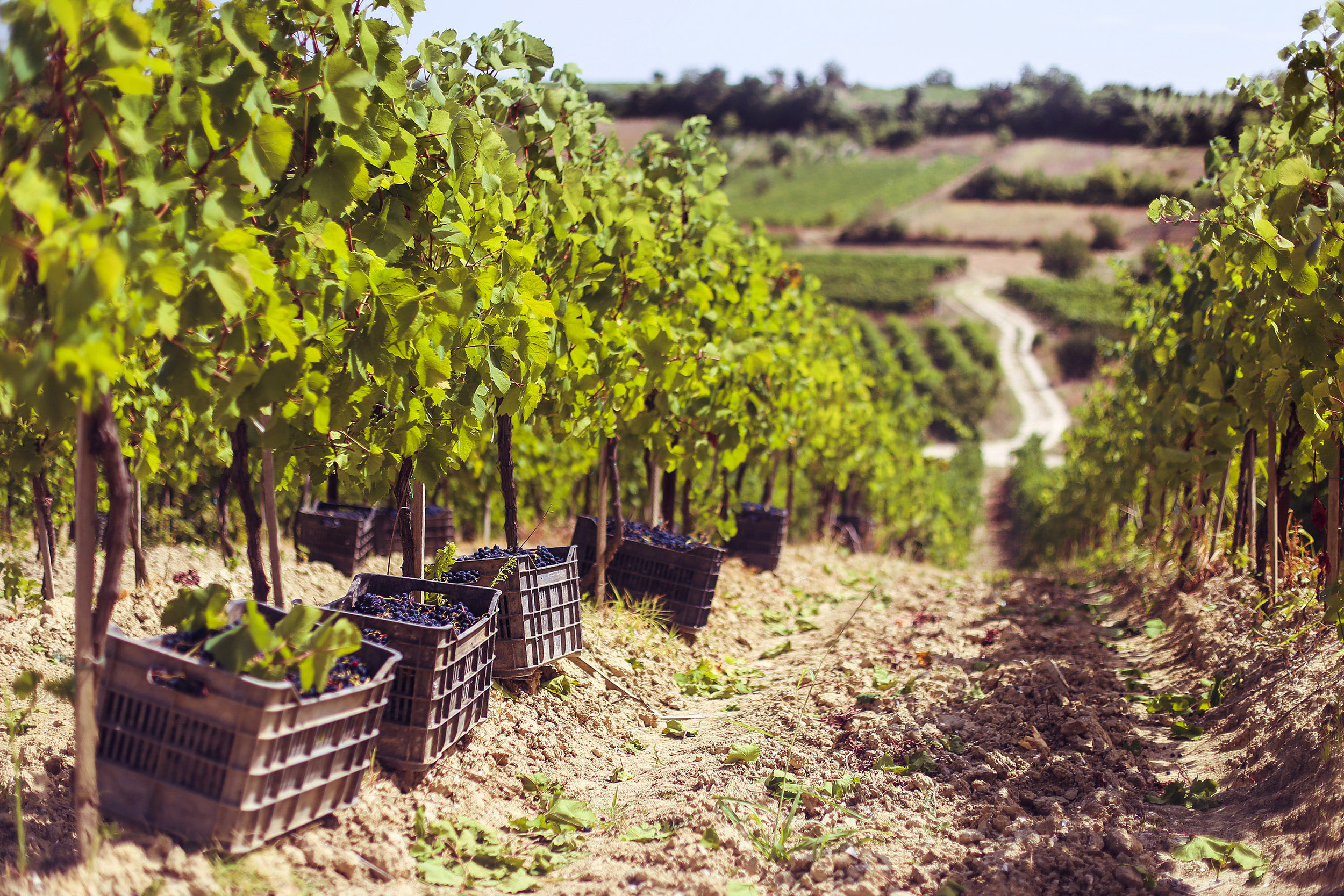
Rahovec's vineyards

Rahovec is especially known for its vineyards and wines.

== Notable people ==
- Shkëlzen Maliqi (born 1947), Kosovo Albanian former politician, born in Rahovec.
- Ajet Shehu (born 1990), English footballer, born in Rahovec.
- Ukshin Hoti (1943–1999), Kosovo Albanian activist, politician, and philosopher, born in Krusha e Madhe.
- Meriton Korenica (born 1996), Kosovo Albanian footballer playing for CFR Cluj and the Kosovo national football team, born in Rahovec.
- Ali Sokoli (1921–1974), Yugoslav physician, born in Rahovec.
- Jovan Grković-Gapon (1879–1912), Serbian Chetnik, born in Rahovec.
- Lazar Kujundžić (1880–1905), Serbian Chetnik commander, born in Rahovec.
- Kida (born 1997), Kosovo Albanian female singer
- Bylbyl Sokoli (born 1957), Kosovan football manager and politician
