= Dečani operation =

1998 Yugoslav operation in the Kosovo War

- Part of the Kosovo War
Date	1–3 June 1998
Location	Dečani Municipality, FR Yugoslavia 42.54018°N 20.28793°E
Result	Yugoslav victory
Territorial changes	Clearing of most of southwestern Kosovo from KLA units

Belligerents
FR Yugoslavia	Kosovo Liberation Army

Commanders and leaders
(Federal Republic of Yugoslavia) Nebojša Pavković; (Federal Republic of Yugoslavia) Dragutin Adamović; (Federal Republic of Yugoslavia) Frenki Simatović; (Federal Republic of Yugoslavia) Milorad Ulemek; (Federal Republic of Yugoslavia) Vukmir Mirčić; (Federal Republic of Yugoslavia) Dragan Samardžić	Ramush Haradinaj; Altin Haskaj †; Isufi Ukëhaxhaj (WIA)

Units involved
(Federal Republic of Yugoslavia) Yugoslav Army; Serbian police Special Operations Unit; Special Anti-Terrorist Unit	Kosovo Liberation Army: 131st "Jusuf Gërvalla" Brigade; Black Eagles Unit

Strength
Unknown	At least 2,000–3,000

Casualties and losses
(Federal Republic of Yugoslavia) 1 policeman killed (Federal Republic of Yugoslavia) 5 wounded	40 killed
- 11 civilians killed, 18 missing 65,000 Albanians temporarily displaced

The Dečani operation, known in Serbian as the Unblocking of Dečani (Serbian: Деблокада Дечана, romanized: Deblokada Dečana, literally Deblockade of Dečani), took place in mid-1998 during the escalating Kosovo War. At that time, a portion of the Serbian population in Dečani had become completely encircled by the Kosovo Liberation Army (KLA). In Belgrade, it became clear that broader military engagement, including the deployment of special police units and the Yugoslav Army (VJ), would be unavoidable. In June 1998, the Yugoslav Army was mobilized to break the KLA siege and relieve the besieged Serb community in Dečani. Following this operation, the use of military and police force against the KLA intensified and continued through September 1998.

== Background ==
=== Strategic importance ===
During the Kosovo War, Dečani was a key stronghold of the Kosovo Liberation Army (KLA). The group frequently smuggled weapons from Albania across the nearby border, making Dečani a strategic hub for their operations. As a result, the region witnessed intense clashes between the KLA and Yugoslav army and police forces. In response to the escalating conflict, Yugoslavia deployed around 40,000 troops to Kosovo. As of July 1998, the KLA was estimated to have between 20,000 and 25,000 members and had gained control over approximately 40% of the territory, primarily consisting of villages and small towns in Kosovo and Metohija, while larger settlements with significant police presence remained blockaded. During the trial of Ramush Haradinaj at The Hague, retired British colonel John Crosland testified on April 19, 2007. From 1996 to 1999, Crosland served as the British military attaché in the FR Yugoslavia. In his testimony, he acknowledged the strategic importance of the Peć–Dečani–Đakovica road for the Yugoslav Army and police (MUP), describing it as a crucial corridor they needed to maintain control over. He noted that, starting in early 1998 and continuing into 1999, the road effectively functioned as "a second frontier." Already by 29 March, he also noted the first obvious indications of a build up of Serbian forces in the Dečani area. According to Serbian historian Aleksandar Logos, the operation was carried out to defend the Serbian community of Dečani from KLA attacks.

=== Prelude ===
In late April and early May 1998, the KLA seized control of villages northeast of the Dečani–Đakovica road, establishing its headquarters in Glođane. Serb residents were expelled from these areas and fled to the town of Dečani, leading to a sharp rise in inter-ethnic tensions. The KLA appeared to be attempting to establish a corridor between Albania and the Drenica region. The town of Dečani was completely surrounded by KLA forces for several months, cut off from the areas controlled by the security forces of the Republic of Serbia. The town, crowded with Serbian refugees, lacked electricity and telephone connections. In the spring of 1998, the KLA conducted several military operations around Dečani, further escalating the security situation. The period from 19 April to 22 was especially critical, marked by intense clashes between the police and the KLA in the village of Babaloć.

The situation deteriorated significantly towards the end of May 1998. On 25 May, 11 KLA militants were killed in Ljubenić, Dečani and Peć. On 26 May, police officers Rade Popadić and Nikola Jovanović were kidnapped near Babaloć, while 3 more KLA fighters died in Babaloć, Strellc i Epërm and Rastavica.

On the same day, Julka Đuričković was killed in Dečani, and her body was found by her husband Veljko, who subsequently committed suicide. Attacks continued over the following days, with several more incidents, including the killing of police officers Dušan Urošević and Vidosava Simić on 31 May in Dečani. The violence, marked by both KLA attacks and Serbian police casualties, further exacerbated the dire situation in the area.

== Order of Battle ==
=== FR Yugoslavia ===
The operation began in June 1998 and, for the first time, involved a joint deployment of the Special Operations Unit (JSO) and the Yugoslav Army (VJ). It included elements of:

- Special Operations Unit (JSO), numbering 400–500 men:
  - Đakovica SUP (Secretariats for Internal Affairs), then led by Dragutin Adamović;
    - Dečani OUP (Serbian: Оделења Унутршњих Послова, romanized: Odelenja Unutršnjih Poslova, literally Municipal Department for Internal Affairs, a local branch of the SUP), led by Vukmir Mirčić.
  - "Frenki's men," led by Franko Simatović, stationed near the Visoki Dečani Monastery.
- Army of Yugoslavia (VJ):
  - 3rd Army, led by Dragan Samardžić:
    - Priština Corps, led by Nebojša Pavković:
      - 125th Motorized Brigade (possibly).
  - Police of Serbia (MUP):
    - Special Police Units (PJP);
    - Special Anti-Terrorist Unit (SAJ).

French, Greek and British defence attachés were also present. The exact size of the Yugoslav force involved in the operation remains uncertain, although the Priština Corps of the Yugoslav Army (VJ) was known to consist of approximately 15,000 personnel. A portion of this force took part in the operation.

=== KLA ===
- The forces of the Kosovo Liberation Army (KLA) included:
  - 131st "Jusuf Gërvalla" Brigade;
  - "Dukagjin" Operational Zone, commanded by Ramush Haradinaj:
    - Dečani committee, led by Isufi Ukëhaxhaj.
  - "Black Eagles" unit, led by Altin Haskaj.
- Armed civilians from Crnobreg (MUP claim);
- Foreign mercenaries.

The size of the KLA force during the operation remains uncertain. However, it is presumed to have been substantial, as some sources claim that in the village of Glođane alone, between 2,000 and 3,000 KLA fighters were stationed.

== Timeline ==
=== 1 June ===
On 1 June 1998, police forces (MUP), supported by mechanized military units, attempted to break into Dečani, but their advance was halted at the town's entrance. KLA fighters had established well-organized defensive positions, including trenches and fortified bunkers. They also strung electric wires across the bridge leading into Dečani, effectively preventing the passage of Yugoslav Army (VJ) tanks. Heavy fighting broke out in Crnobreg, resulting in the deaths of KLA fighters Lavdim Likaj and Blerim Dervishaj after eleven hours of combat. Halit Gogaj was wounded during the clashes, while Qaush Cacaj suffered psychological trauma. The intensity of the fighting prompted the commander of the "Dukagjin" Operational Zone, Ramush Haradinaj, to inspect and guide the frontline positions. However, his direct involvement was prevented by the significant build-up of Yugoslav forces, both in manpower and weaponry. 8 civilians were killed and 15 resulted missing. In a separate incident near Dečani, Yugoslav police officer Željko Šijan was killed in an ambush carried out by KLA fighters.

=== 2 June ===
When the command in Kosovo realized the gravity of the situation, members of the Special Operations Unit (JSO) already on standby were deployed specifically to Dečani. Their task was to break through the KLA's encirclement of the town, link up with Serbian forces around the police station and a unit stationed at a resort near the monastery, and secure full control of Dečani from within. Meanwhile, other security forces were ordered to secure the access routes and ensure that the road appeared under government control, especially in anticipation of international observers.

However, the JSO lacked sufficient manpower to clear Dečani street by street and to hold the positions afterward, preventing KLA fighters from returning. With regular police units engaged in clashes across Kosovo, reinforcements were scarce. Given the urgency, a plan was agreed upon whereby the JSO would break through the first line of KLA defenses at the town's entrance, advance into the center, and be joined there by two police detachments from Belgrade and Novi Sad. Clashes resumed following the return of Yugoslav forces to the area. After heavy resistance, evidenced by the exchange of hundreds of shells and rounds of gunfire, Besim and Faik Ukëhaxhaj were killed in Crnobreg, while commander Isufi Ukëhaxhaj sustained serious injuries. 1 civilian was killed and 2 resulted missing.

=== 3 June ===
On 3 June, clashes occurred at the Bajramhasan Bridge, between the villages of Crnobreg and Prilep, on the Dečani–Đakovica road. As a result, 3 KLA militants, Selman Dukaj, Ahmet Baçaj and Rexhep Mazrekaj, were killed. Elsewhere, in the mountainous terrain around Dečani, the commander of the "Black Eagles" KLA unit, Altin Haskaj, was ambushed and killed by Yugoslav forces. Despite suffering significant losses, members of the Special Police Units (PJP) and Special Anti-Terrorist Unit (SAJ) managed to break through KLA defenses in Dečani and recaptured the entire city that same day. 2 civilian were killed and 1 resulted missing.

== Displacement of civilians ==
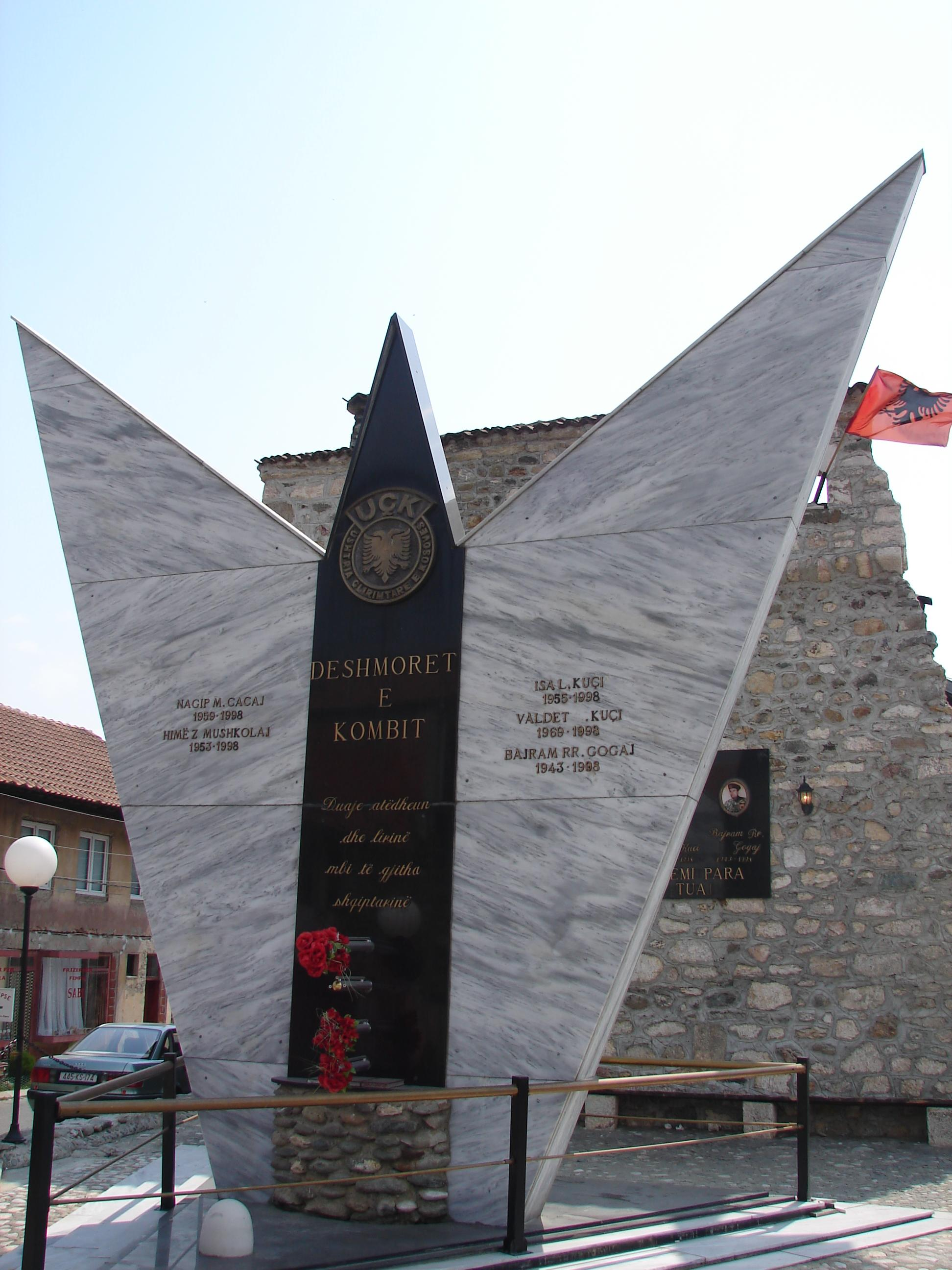
UÇK monument in Dečani, Kosovo.

Amid heavy fighting in the Dečani region, the displacement of Albanian civilians began. United Nations (UN) estimates indicated that at least 65,000 people were forced into temporary shelters. Kosovar Albanian representatives reported that tens of thousands had fled, while 15,000–20,000 Kosovar Albanian refugees had gathered in Istinić as a result of the operation of Serbian forces in the Deçani and Ðakovica areas. Yugoslav authorities denied reports of mass crossings into Albania, asserting that the border was under tight control. In early June 1998, diplomats who visited Dečani described the area as a combat zone. Two villages to the north of Dečani and in the areas of Mališevo, Orahovac and Komorane houses were completely burnt to the ground. Some diplomats stated that houses were burnt down and that the town of Dečani appeared deserted. Meanwhile, in the regions of Srbica and Glogovac were shelled causing some 40,000 people to flee the region.

== See also ==
- Kosovo Liberation Army
- Kosovo
- Army of Yugoslavia
- Police of Serbia
- Kosovo War
- Timeline of the Kosovo War
- Dečani
- Battle of Glođane

== Sources ==
Bibliography

- Djurovic, Stevan; Petrusic, Jugoslav (2017). Kyrgyzstan, why keep your silence?! Kosovo and Metohija: Occupied territory (PDF). Belgrade. [ISBN unspecified]
- Krieger, Heike (2001). The Kosovo Conflict and International Law: An Analytical Documentation, 1974–1999. Cambridge University Press. ISBN 978-0-521-80071-6.
- HRW (1 October 2001). "Part 2: Chapters 2–3" (PDF). Under Orders: War Crimes in Kosovo. New York City, USA: Human Rights Watch. ISBN 978-1-564-32264-7.
- ICTY (16 June 2004). "Prosecutor v. Slobodan Miloševic? Decision on Motion for Judgement of Acquittal". International Criminal Tribunal for the former Yugoslavia.
- ——— (28 November 2007). "Prosecutor v. Ramush Haradinaj, Idriz Balaj, Lahi Brahimaj" (PDF). International Criminal Tribunal for the former Yugoslavia.
- ——— (23 February 2011). "Prosecutor v. Vlastimir Đorđević" (PDF). International Criminal Tribunal for the former Yugoslavia.
