= Deçan Bistrica =

River in Kosovo

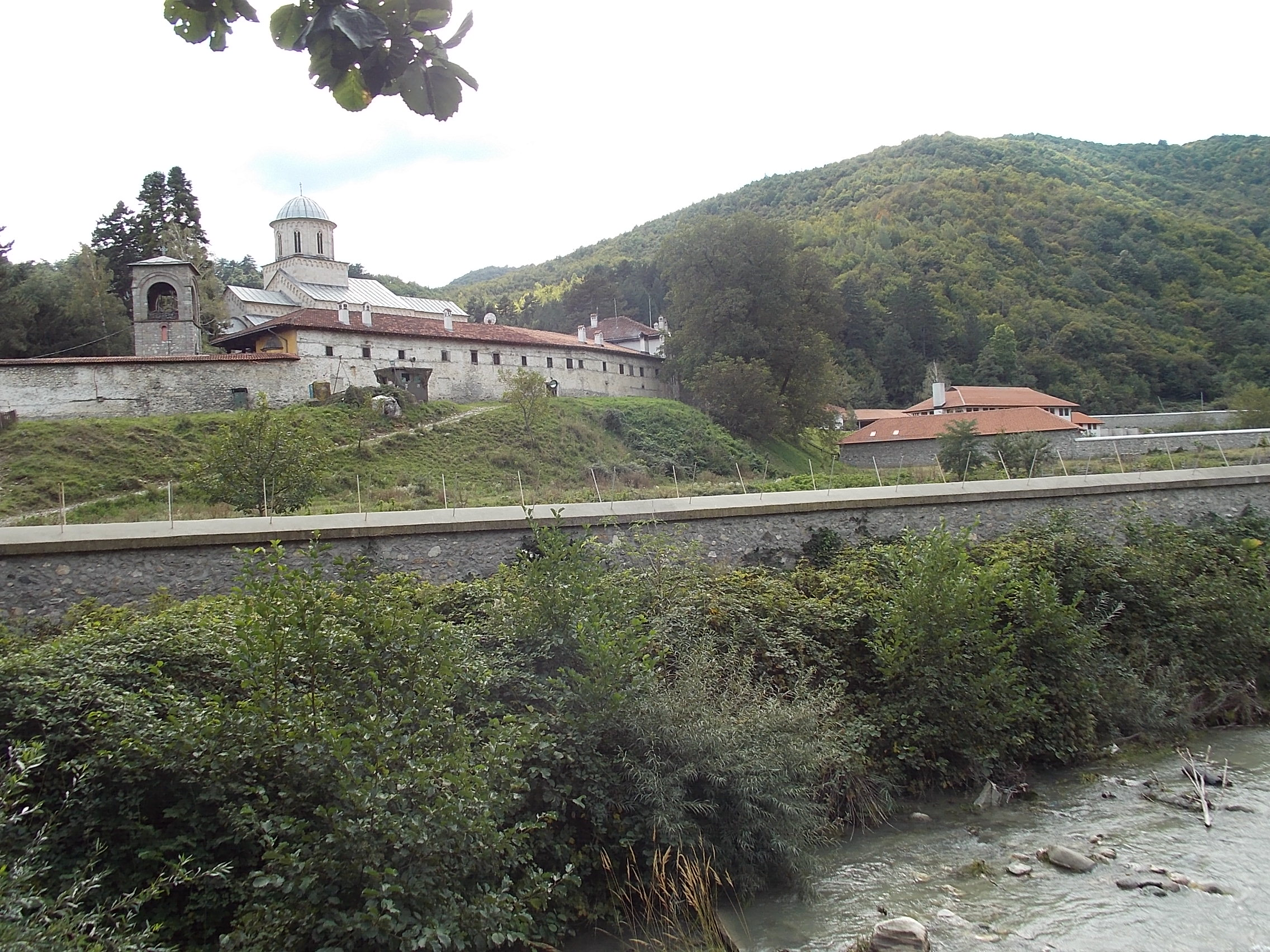
- Native name: Lumbardhi i Deçanit (Albanian); Bistrica e Deçanit (Albanian); Дечанска Бистрица (Serbian); Dečanska Bistrica (Serbian)

Location
- Country: Kosovo

Physical characteristics
- Source
  - location: Bogiçevica mountain, Kosovo
- Mouth
  - location: White Drin, near Klina
  - coordinates: 42.5175°N 20.5425°E
- Length: 53 km (33 mi)
- Basin size: 300 km^{2} (120 sq mi)

Basin features
- Progression: White Drin→ Drin→ Adriatic Sea

Lumbardhi i Deçanit, Deçan Bistrica, or Dečanska Bistrica (Albanian: Bistrica e Deçanit; Serbian: Дечанска Бистрица, romanized: Dečanska Bistrica), is a river in Kosovo. It is a 53 km (33 mi)-long right tributary of the White Drin River, passing the western part of Kosovo.

== Name ==
The river's name, Lumbardh, literally translates to White River in Albanian. The adjective, i Deçanit, differentiates it from the other Lumbardh tributaries of the White Drin (Albanian: Drinit të Bardhë) in the Dukagjini area. The other name, Bistrica, means "clearwater" in Serbian. Like the official name, the adjective Dečanska, "of Dečani", is added to distinguish it from other Bistrica rivers in the Dukagjini region: Peja's Lumbardh ("of Peć"), Prizren's Lumbardh ("of Prizren"), Baba Loc's Lumbardh ("of Baba Loc/Kožnjar"), Lloqan's Lumbardh ("of Loćane"), etc.

== Geography ==
=== Bjeshkët e Nemuna and Gorge of Deçan ===
Lumbardhi i Deçanit river originates from the southern slopes of the Albanian Alps, near the Maja e Bardhë peak. The river flows north of the Gjeravica peak, the highest in Kosovo (2,656 m), initially under the name of Lumi Shqiptar, and receives many streams from the both side of its stream. The river turns southeast on the northern slopes of the Kopranik and Strellc mountains, where it carved the deep gorge of Deçan (Gryka e Deçanit). The upper part of the gorge is the glacial trough of the ancient Deçan glacier on the Bjeshkët e Nemuna, or Accursed Mountains.

=== Dukagjini region ===
As the river flows out of the gorge it reaches the medieval monastery of Visoki Dečani, which is on UNESCO's World Heritage List. The river continues eastward, in the very densely populated area next to the town of Deçan and the villages of Isniq, Beleg, Jabllanicë, Këpuz, Kotradiq, Kralan before it empties into the White Drin. In the upper course, on river is Lumbardhi hydroelectrical power plant (6.5 MW) built. In the lower parts its waters are, to some extent, used for irrigation. The Lumbardhi i Deçanit belongs to the Adriatic Sea drainage basin, drains itself an area of 300 km^{2} (120 sq mi), and it is not navigable.

== Bibliography ==
- Mala Prosvetina Enciklopedija, Third edition (1985); Prosveta; ISBN 86-07-00001-2
- Jovan Đ. Marković (1990): Enciklopedijski geografski leksikon Jugoslavije; Svjetlost-Sarajevo; ISBN 86-01-02651-6
