= Luan Haradinaj =

Kosovo Liberation Army soldier

- Born: 17 November 1973; Deçan, SFR Yugoslavia (today Kosovo)
- Died: 6 May 1997 (aged 23); Qafë Prush, Yugoslav–Albanian border, Albania
- Military career
- Allegiance: KosovaAlbania
- Branch: Kosovo Liberation Army
- Service years: 1993–1997
- Rank: Chief of Logistics; Brigadier General (posthumously)
- Nickname: Adrian
- Conflicts: Insurgency in Kosovo (1995–98): • Battle of Qafë Prush †
- Awards: Hero of Kosovo

Luan Haradinaj (17 November 1973 – 6 May 1997) was a Kosovo Liberation Army soldier who died during the fight with Serbian/Yugoslav forces in Qafë Prush, at the border of that time of Yugoslavia and Albania.

== Early life and education ==
Luan was born on 17 November 1973 in the village of Glloxhan, near Deçan (Albanian: Deçani), in Kosovo, then part of Yugoslavia. His paternal descent is from Berishë in northern Albania, around the city of Pukë. He spent his youth in his native village with his parents and 9 other siblings, including his elder brothers Ramush and Shkëlzen and his younger Brother Daut. He completed primary school in Irzniq and secondary school in Deçan and Gjakova.

== Involvement in the Kosovo Liberation Army ==
=== First resistance in Dukagjin ===
In November 1993, Luan Haradinaj, alongside his brother Shkelzën Haradinaj and their fellow comrades, formed one of the first nuclei of armed resistance in the Dukagjin region. Luan, together with his brothers Ramush, Shkëlzen, Daut, and other supporters of the cause, including Lahi Brahimaj, Agim Zeneli, and Adrian Krasniqi, began organizing armed groups to resist Serbian forces.

In recognition of his diligence and organizational capabilities, the General Staff of the Kosovo Liberation Army appointed Luan as the Chief of Logistics in 1994. In this role, he was responsible for the supply of weapons to future KLA fighters. Luan also played a key role in planning and executing numerous combat operations against the Serbian police, particularly targeting strategic points and police stations in locations such as Baballoq, Isniq, Deçan, Junik, Hylaj, and other positions held by enemy forces.

Among his peers, Luan was known for his honesty, solidarity, and the care he provided during border crossings. His prolonged military involvement allowed him to master the routes, often leading the way for his fellow fighters.

=== Military education in Albania ===
During his stays in Albania, Luan was introduced to a wide circle of soldiers from all captive Albanian lands, especially Kosovo. Luan also maintained contact with Kosovo Liberation Army commanders Adem Jashari, Rexhep Selimi and Sylejman Selimi, Abedin Rexha and Fehmi Lladrovci. He has maintained contacts with Zahir Pajaziti and Ilir Konusevci. The contribution of the Haradinaj brothers to the expansion and consolidation of the ranks of the Kosovo Liberation Army is a very important chapter and his memory has been preserved by KLA soldiers.

In the face of the occupation forces in the spring of 1997, numerous liberation groups went from Kosovo to Albania and from Albania to Kosovo, although Serbian occupation forces had reinforced all crossings, the first Kosovo Liberation Army soldiers and rescuers had penetrated. The boundary that once divided the territories of Federal Republic of Yugoslavia and Albania, however, had begun to become passable to KLA soldiers, at any time of the year, at any time of day or night.

== Death ==
On May 6, 1997, Luan Haradinaj, alongside his brother Ramush Haradinaj and fellow KLA members, embarked on a mission to cross the border near the village of Vlahne in the Has region, heading towards Kuzhin. The group included many fighters such as Fehmi Lladrovci, Xhevë Krasniqi-Lladrovci, Ilaz Kodra or Ali Ahmeti.

On that day, Serbian military and police forces had set up an ambush along their route. Luan Haradinaj, leading the group, was the first to be caught in the ambush. During the ensuing confrontation, Rafet Rama was seriously injured, while Ramush Haradinaj and Fehmi Lladrovci sustained minor injuries. The situation quickly escalated into an armed conflict to the Battle of Qafë Prush as the Yugoslav forces launched heavy artillery attacks with the intent to eliminate the KLA fighters.

Despite the overwhelming firepower, Ramush Haradinaj managed to reach his brother's position. Upon discovering Luan's lifeless body, Ramush, under constant enemy fire, succeeded in retrieving his brother's remains. After a grueling four-hour retreat, Ramush and his comrades carried Luan's body to the village of Vlahne, where they buried him. Luan Haradinaj's death was a significant loss, but his fellow fighters, including his brothers, continued fighting until the withdrawal of Serb forces from Kosovo on 11 June 1999, after a NATO bombing campaign.

== Legacy ==
On August 24, 1999, Luan's body was removed from his burial ground in Vlahne and re-buried in his native village. In honor and commemoration of his work, the General Staff of the Liberation Army and the President of Kosovo Hashim Thaçi described Luan Haradinaj as the heart and soul of the Kosovo Liberation Army. In 2019, the Prime Minister of Kosovo, Isa Mustafa, commemorated Luan Haradinaj on the 19th anniversary of his death. Haradinaj was posthumously awarded the title of Hero of Kosovo in recognition of his contributions and sacrifice.
