= Shkëlzen Haradinaj =

Kosovo Liberation Army soldier

- Born: 25 March 1970; Deçan, SFR Yugoslavia
- Died: 16 April 1999 (aged 29); Maznik, Deçan, FR Yugoslavia (now Kosovo)
- Military career
- Allegiance: KosovaAlbania
- Branch: Kosovo Liberation Army
- Service years: 1993–1999
- Rank: Deputy Commandant; Colonel general (posthumously)
- Nickname: Skifteri or Xeni
- Conflicts: Insurgency in Kosovo (1995–98) Kosovo War: Battle of Gllogjane; Battle of Junik; Battle of Mazniku †
- Awards: Hero of Kosovo

Shkëlzen Haradinaj (25 March 1970 – 16 April 1999) was a Kosovo Liberation Army soldier and commander who died during the fight with Serbian/Yugoslav forces in Maznik, while trying to protect the civilian population hiding in the forests near Deçan.

== Early life ==
Shkelzen was born on 25 March 1970 in the village of Glloxhan, near Deçan, in Kosovo, then part of Yugoslavia. His paternal descent is from Berishë in northern Albania, around the city of Pukë. He spent his youth in his native village with his parents and 9 other siblings, including his elder brothers Ramush and his younger Brothers Luan and Daut. He completed primary school and secondary school in Irzniq.

== Military career ==
=== Insurgency in Kosovo ===
In 1993, Shkëlzen Haradinaj joined the Kosovo Liberation Army (KLA) units in the Dukagjin region, playing a significant role alongside his brother Luan in organizing the resistance against Serbian forces. Their family home became a key base for KLA operations, supporting attacks against Serbian police and military units. Shkëlzen was closely involved with prominent KLA figures like Zahir Pajaziti and Hashim Thaçi, contributing to the growth and consolidation of the KLA’s presence in the region.

On August 29, 1995, two Serbian police officers were killed and four others were injured in an attack on the police station in Isniq. Throughout 1997, specifically in the months of August, September, and November, Shkëlzen Haradinaj participated in various operations against Serbian forces. His leadership and military skills were instrumental in expanding KLA operations.

=== Kosovo War ===
Upon learning of the attack by Serbian forces on Adem Jashari and his family in Prekaz killing over 42 people in early March 1998, Shkelzen Haradinaj, with friends operating in the Dukagjin sub-zone, carried out over 22 armed actions overnight against Serbian police and paramilitary bases in the Dukagjin region.

He was a central figure in the Battle of Gllogjane on March 24, 1998, which with the fall and Hima Haradinaj, who was the first fallen in frontal war in the Dukagjin Zone, marked the escalation of conflict in the Dukagjin area.

In September 1998, following the Desertion of Tahir Zemaj and his men, Shkëlzen, along with his brothers, reorganized the KLA in the Dukagjin zone. The KLA General Staff later appointed him deputy commander of Territorial Defense for the Operational Zone of Dukagjin, and in November 1998, he was given responsibility for overseeing local KLA combat operations.

== Death ==
In April 1999, as intense fighting broke out in the Deçan and Gjakova areas, Shkëlzen led efforts to protect and evacuate wounded soldiers to safer areas. On April 16, 1999, during a mission to break through Serbian lines and safeguard civilians trapped in the mountains of Maznik, Shkëlzen and his unit engaged in a fierce firefight with Serbian forces, which led to the Battle of Mazniku.

Despite being heavily outnumbered, Shkëlzen fought valiantly but sustained fatal injuries. Alongside him, fellow fighters Luan Nimanaj, Fatmir Nimanaj, and Hasim Halilaj were also killed in action.

== Legacy ==
He is considered one of the key figures of the Kosovo Liberation Army and is synonymous with many battles in Dukagjin area. After his death the Guard-Bataillon of the Dukagjin area of the KLA was named after him. On 21 July 2011 the President of the Republic of Kosovo, Atifete Jahjaga, awarded Shkëlzen Haradinaj with the Order Hero of Kosovo.

Shkëlzen Haradinaj was married and had two sons Shqipdon and Luan Haradinaj (named after his dead brother Luan Haradinaj). Shqipdon died in 2007 after a car accident, aged only 11. His other son, Luan Haradinaj, was the first to be promoted Lieutenant of the Military Secret Service of the KSF, after finishing US Military Intelligence Basic Course.
