= Shabanaj Family Mill =

Cultural heritage monument of Kosovo

- Mulliri i Shabanajve (Albanian)
- Location: Deçan, Kosovo

History
- Built: 19th century

The Shabanaj Family Mill is a cultural heritage monument in Deçan, Kosovo. The women's organization Jeta sells handicrafts there.
