= Carrabreg i Poshtëm =

Village in Deçan, Kosovo

- Village
- Donji Crnobreg; Доњи Црнобрег; Carrabreg i Poshtëm
- Location in Kosovo
- Coordinates: 42°32′N 20°17′E
- Country: Kosovo
- Municipality: Municipality of Deçan
- First mention: 1330
- Elevation: 600 m (2,000 ft)

Population (2024)
  - Total: 1,162
- Time zone: UTC+1 (CET)
  - Summer (DST): UTC+2 (CEST)
- Postal code: 51000
- Area code: 0381 390

Carrabreg i Poshtëm (Serbian: Доњи Црнобрег) is a village in the Deçan municipality of western Kosovo. It is located in the Dukagjini basin between Deçan and the village of Prilep along the mountainous border with Albania. The majority of the population comprises ethnic Albanians.

== Geography ==
The village, of the "compact type", is located on 600m altitude on the left valley side of the Bistrica e Lloqanit (river), on both sides of the old Deçan–Gjakovë road.

== History ==
Crnveni breg (Црвени брег) was mentioned in the Dečani chrysobull (1330). In the Ottoman defter of 1485, the village (Turkish: Cirun Brek) had 19 Serb households and one Muslim household. In 1921, there were 58 households and 634 inhabitants. There are ruins of two Orthodox churches in the village, the Church of St. Nicholas, and the Church of St. George, both mentioned in the 1330 chrysobull. After World War II, the villages of Gornji Crnobreg and Donji Crnobreg were one hamlet, Crnobreg (Црнобрег), of Deçan.
