= Strellc i Epërm =

Strellc i Epërm Gornji Streoc
- Village
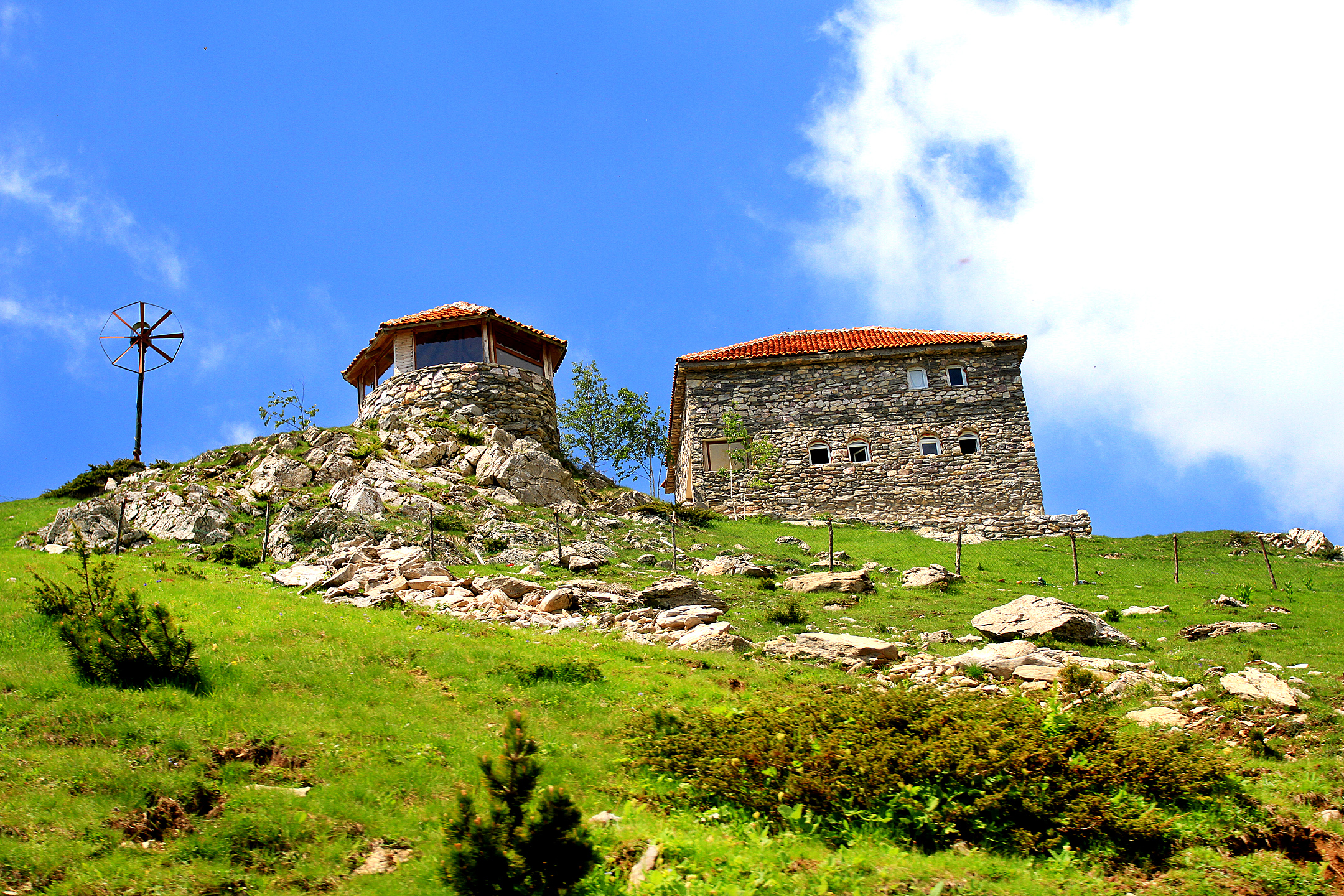

- Location within Kosovo
- Coordinates: 42.578633°N 20.294069°E
- Country: Kosovo
- District: District of Peja
- Municipality: Deçan

Population (2024)
  - Total: 2,055
- Time zone: UTC+1 (CET)
  - Summer (DST): UTC+2 (CEST)

Strellc i Epërm (in Albanian) or Gornji Streoc (Serbian: Горњи Стреоц), meaning "Upper Streoc", is a village in the Deçan municipality of western Kosovo, located between Deçan and Pejë along the mountainous border with Albania. The majority of inhabitants are ethnic Albanians.

== Geography ==
The village is a rural settlement of the half-scattered type. It is located on the eastern slopes of the Strellci mountain (2336 m).

== History ==
The village of Strelac (Стрѣльц; Стрелац) was first mentioned in Serbian medieval documents. Ruins of a medieval fort (known in Serbian as gradište) exist below the village, on the Çeçan mountain. The settlement was later divided into two parts, Gornji- (Upper) and Donji (Lower) Streoc. The village name was also spelled Gornje Streoce (Горње Стреоце), Streovce, and Strovce.

During the Crimean War (1853–56), many Serbian families left the kaza (district) of Ipek and Yakova; 20 Serbian families left the village of Strellc.

In 1901, an Albanian from Streoce tried to steal cattle from the Visoki Dečani, and was executed by Ottoman askeri; the mutesarif of Ipek welcomed their act, but his family threatened with vengeance towards the yüz başa of that crew. After some days, an Ottoman crew of 25 was ambushed in Streoce.

Both Strellc i Epërm and Strellc i Ulët were featured in an Episode of the Australian Series Foreign Correspondent prior to the Kosovo War.

== Demographics ==
The village had a total population of 3,347 inhabitants according to the 2011 census. The majority of inhabitants are ethnic Albanians.

According to the last census of 2024, the village has a population of 2,055 inhabitants.

== Anthropology ==
The village's Albanians hail from Krasniqe.
