= The Trial (2009 film) =

Irish war documentary

- Directed by: Rob O'Reilly; John Murphy
- Produced by: Rob O'Reilly; John Murphy
- Cinematography: Paddy Jordan
- Edited by: Hugh Williams
- Music by: Birger Clausen
- Production company: Headland Pictures
- Release date: 2009
- Running time: 72 minutes
- Country: Ireland
- Languages: English; Albanian; Serbian; French

The Trial is a 2009 Irish documentary film made by Headland Pictures following the trial for war crimes of the former Prime Minister of Kosovo, Ramush Haradinaj.

Directed and produced by Rob O'Reilly and John Murphy, the film follows Haradinaj's legal team behind the scenes as they struggle to defend their client. It also features interviews with Haradinaj himself, as well as Soren Jessen-Petersen, the former head of UNMIK in Kosovo, and Klaus Reinhardt, the former head of NATO in Kosovo.

The film was shot in mainly in the Netherlands and Kosovo.

The film premiered at the Galway Film Fleadh in 2009.

== Synopsis ==
In September 1998, at the end of the Balkan Wars, the military of Yugoslavia discovered 37 dead bodies in a concrete canal in western Kosovo. Seven years later, the Prime Minister of Kosovo would be falsely accused of their murder.

Haradinaj was a prominent commander in the Kosovo Liberation Army, a freedom fighting guerilla group which fought for independence from Yugoslavia. In 2004, he was elected Prime Minister of Kosovo. Just 100 days into his term, he was indicted by a war crimes tribunal for the alleged massacre in 1998.

The film follows the events of the unfolding trial as seen through the eyes of Michael O'Reilly, an Irish lawyer living in Pristina and one of Haradinaj's closest political advisors. O'Reilly assembles a team of international lawyers and investigators determined to rebut what they see as an unjust indictment.

Over the course of the trial, O'Reilly and his team expose fundamental weaknesses in the prosecution case theory, arguing that the crime scene is not a KLA massacre site, but instead, a fabrication of Serbian war propaganda. Moreover, as the trial draws to a dramatic conclusion, they uncover deeply unsettling truths about the motivation behind the indictment itself.

The Trial is an examination of the world of international justice as seen from inside the Haradinaj defence team. It explores how ideals of truth and justice can be corrupted within a legal setting and asks serious questions about the politicisation of the International Criminal Tribunal for the former Yugoslavia.

Above all, it is the story of a group of people standing against injustice, and fighting for what they believe to be the truth.

== Cast ==
- Ramush Haradinaj as Self
- Michael O'Reilly as Self
