= Lahi Brahimaj =

Kosovo Liberation Army commander

- Born: 26 January 1970 (age 56); Jablanica, Gjakova, SFR Yugoslavia
- Relatives: Ramush Haradinaj
- Military career
- Branch: Kosovo Liberation Army; Kosovo Protection Corps
- Rank: Deputy commander
- Nickname: Magjupi
- Unit: Operational Staff of the Dukagjin Zone
- Conflicts: Kosovo War
- Criminal information
- Convictions: One count of torture One count of cruel treatment
- Penalty: 6 years

Lahi Brahimaj (born 26 January 1970), known by the nickname Magjupi ("the Gypsy"), was a Kosovo Liberation Army (KLA) commander during the Kosovo War (1998–99). A Kosovo Albanian, Brahimaj was born in Jablanica, a village in Gjakova, SFR Yugoslavia (now Gjakova, Kosovo). He is a close relative of Ramush Haradinaj, the KLA commander of the Dukagjin Zone (the Metohija region). During the Kosovo War he was the deputy commander of the Operational Staff of the Dukagjin Zone, as well as the intermediary between the Dukagjin Zone Staff and the KLA Main Staff, and the manager of a prison in Jablanica. After the war he became an officer in the Kosovo Protection Corps. On 4 March 2005, the ICTY raised indictments against Ramush Haradinaj, Idriz Balaj and Lahi Brahimaj on 37 counts (Prosecutor v. Haradinaj, Balaj, and Brahimaj), including crimes against humanity, violation of the law and custom of war. They were accused of crimes committed between 1 March and 30 September 1998. The three surrendered on 9 March 2005. After four years of trial, in 2008, Haradinaj and Balaj were deemed innocent and freed. Meanwhile, Brahimaj was sentenced to six years for cruel treatment and torture as violations of the laws or customs of war in two counts.

== Sources ==
- Nimoni, Genc (2014). "Slučaj Haradinaj i ostali" (PDF). Regionalna škola tranzicione pravde - Zbornik. 1: 55–59.
- "LAHI BRAHIMAJ TO REMAIN IN DETENTION". Sense Agency. 7 November 2005. Archived from the original on 12 February 2017.
- "Brahimaj, Lahi". The Hague Justice Portal. 2011. Archived from the original on 7 December 2015.
- "Haradinaj, Balaj, and Brahimaj Acquitted on Retrial". ICTY. 29 November 2012.
