= Ramush Haradinaj =

Prime Minister of Kosovo (2004–2005; 2017–2020)

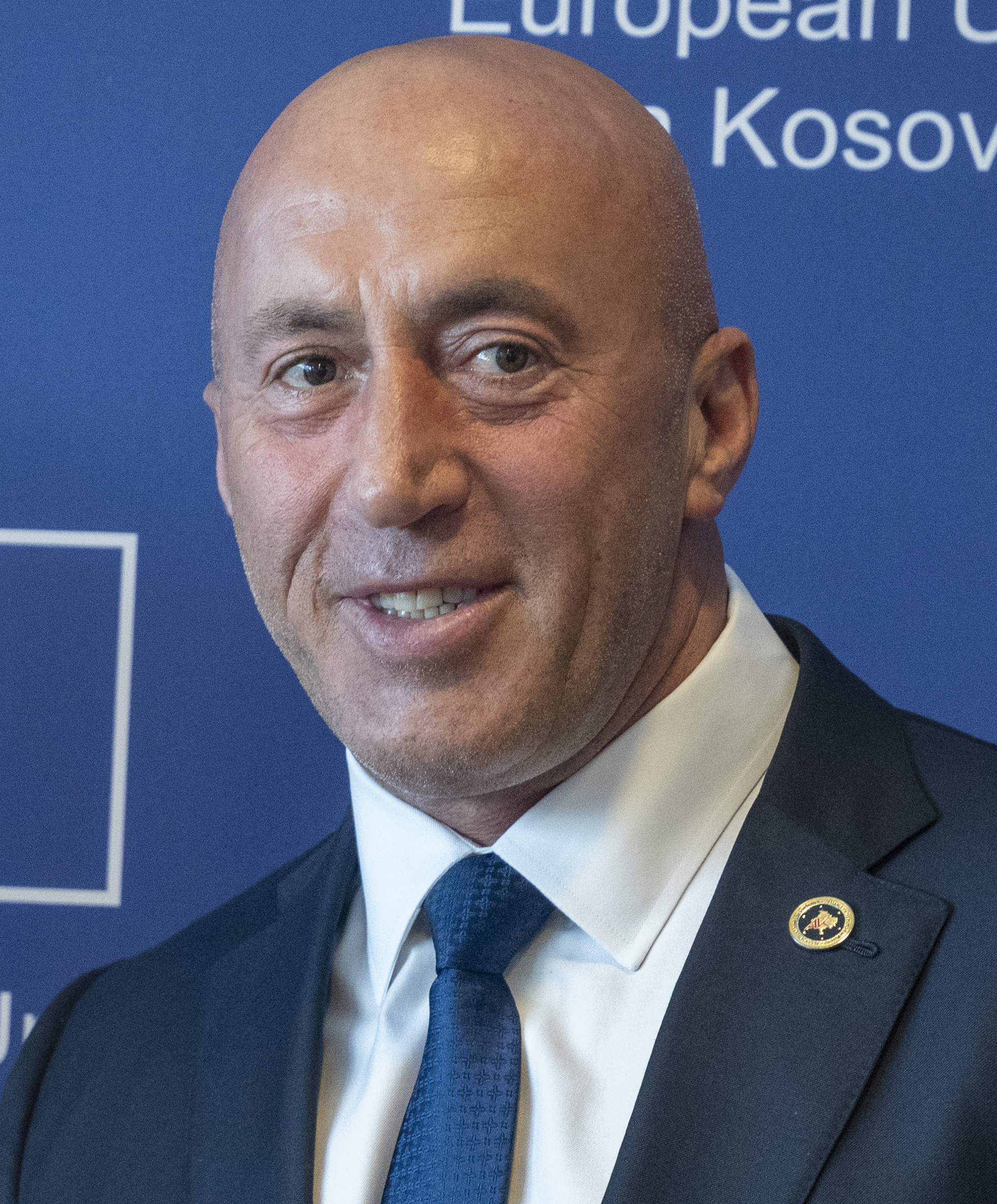
- Haradinaj in 2025

Prime Minister of Kosovo
- In office 9 September 2017 – 3 February 2020
- President: Hashim Thaçi
- Deputy: Behgjet Pacolli; Fatmir Limaj; Enver Hoxhaj; Dalibor Jevtić; Dardan Gashi
- Preceded by: Isa Mustafa
- Succeeded by: Albin Kurti
- In office 3 December 2004 – 8 March 2005
- President: Ibrahim Rugova
- Preceded by: Bajram Rexhepi
- Succeeded by: Adem Salihaj (acting)

Leader of the Alliance for the Future
- In office 29 April 2001 – 24 May 2026
- Preceded by: Office established
- Succeeded by: Ardian Gjini

Personal details
- Born: 3 July 1968 (age 58) Dečani, Yugoslavia
- Party: Alliance for the Future
- Spouse: Anita Haradinaj (m. 2003)
- Children: 4
- Education: University of Pristina; Rochester Institute of Technology, Kosovo
- Nickname: Rambo

Military service
- Allegiance: Yugoslavia; Kosova
- Branch/service: Yugoslav People's Army; Kosovo Liberation Army
- Years of service: 1987, 1996–1999
- Battles/wars: Insurgency in Kosovo (1995–1998); Kosovo War: KLA spring offensives (1998); Battle of Glodjane (WIA); Battle of Baballoq; Mališevo Offensive; Yugoslav offensive in Kosovo (1998)

Ramush Haradinaj (Albanian: [ɾamuʃ haɾadinaj]; born 3 July 1968) is a Kosovar Albanian politician who served as prime minister of Kosovo from 2004 to 2005 and from 2017 to 2020. He was the leader of the AAK party from its founding in 2000 until May 2026, and is a former officer and leader of the Kosovo Liberation Army (KLA).

Following the dissolution of Yugoslavia, Haradinaj was the KLA's commander for western Kosovo. Following the conflict, Haradinaj went into politics but soon resigned after becoming one of the KLA commanders charged by the International Criminal Tribunal for the former Yugoslavia (ICTY) with war crimes and crimes against humanity against Serbs, Romani and Albanians between March and September 1998 during the Kosovo War. He was acquitted of all charges on 3 April 2008. Prosecutors appealed the acquittal and argued that they were not given enough time to secure the testimony of two critical witnesses. In 2010 the Appeals Chamber agreed and ordered a partial retrial in The Hague, Netherlands. The re-trial took just over two years and on 29 November 2012, Haradinaj and his co-defendant were acquitted for a second time on all charges.

== Early life and education ==
Ramush Haradinaj was born on July 3, 1968, as the second of nine children in the village of Gllogjan, near Deçan, in Kosovo, which was then part of SFR Yugoslavia. He descends from the Thaçi tribe (fis), which traces its roots to Berishë in northern Albania, near the city of Pukë. Former Prime Minister of Kosovo, Hashim Thaçi, who is also a member of the Thaçi tribe, confirmed in an interview on the Albanian show Oxygen that Ramush Haradinaj is part of this tribe. He spent his youth in his native village with his parents and siblings, and completed primary school in Irzniq and secondary school in Deçan and Gjakova. After graduating from high school in 1987, he did his mandatory military service in the Yugoslav People's Army. After the Kosovo War, Haradinaj attended law school at the University of Pristina. Haradinaj also earned a master's degree in business from the American University in Kosovo, which is associated with the Rochester Institute of Technology in New York.

== Emigration to Switzerland and joining KLA ==
In 1989, using a false name, Haradinaj emigrated to Leysin, Switzerland. He worked there for eight years as a construction worker, security guard, and bouncer in a nightclub. As the Soviet Union dealt with new internal challenges, movements for independence began to form among many of the ethnicities of the Balkans and other states. In Switzerland, Haradinaj joined the Albanian nationalist organization "People's Movement of Kosovo", from which the KLA originated; this organization wanted to separate Kosovo from Yugoslavia through armed struggle. In 1996, he went through sabotage training in Albania, then participated in the establishment of KLA bases in Kukës and Tropojë. According to media outlets, he organized the smuggling of arms into Kosovo; in one of those operations he was ambushed by border patrols, during which he was wounded and his brother Luan was killed. In 1998, Haradinaj returned to his hometown of Gllogjan in Kosovo.

== Kosovo War ==
In February 1998, the conflict in Kosovo erupted. According to the ICTY indictment against Fatmir Limaj, Haradin Bala and Isak Musliu, between 28 February and 5 March, Serb forces launched an offensive against the KLA-held villages of Likošane, Cirez, and Prekaze.

Serbian special forces attacked three adjacent villages in Drenice. In all, 83 Kosovar Albanians were killed. Among the dead were elderly people and at least 24 women and children. Many of the victims were shot at close range, which suggested summary executions; subsequent reports from eyewitnesses confirmed this. The attacks on these three villages marked a turning point in the war; KLA membership increased as many Albanians began to fear that their village would be targeted next. The next village targeted was Ramush Haradinaj's home village of Glodjane.

Less than three weeks after the attacks in Drenica, Serbian forces surrounded the village of Glodjane and mounted a similar attack. The Haradinaj family, however, was aware of the previous attacks in Drenice and defended the village. According to Haradinaj's own account, they utilized their superior knowledge of the terrain and local defenses to good effect and under the leadership of Haradinaj, they successfully repelled the attack. This job was made more difficult because Serbian police forces captured a group of civilians and used them as human shields – marching the group in front of Serb soldiers as the forces took cover behind them and attempted to kill the Haradinajs.

During the firefight Ramush Haradinaj was seriously wounded after being shot in the hip by a Serbian policeman. He survived by packing his wound with cheese he found in the room where he took cover. During the firefight three young Kosovar Albanian boys under the age of 18 were killed by Serbian forces, which further galvanized the Albanian population to support the KLA.

After successfully repelling the Serbian attack, Haradinaj gained a leadership position in the KLA in Western Kosovo. As war broke out in Western Kosovo during the spring of 1998, Serbian and Albanian families fled the area for fear of getting caught up in the intense hostilities breaking out.

In September 1998, some months later, the bodies of 39 people were found near Glodjane. The victims were local people, of both Albanian and Serbian ethnicity. The discovery of their bodies led to public accusations of war crimes against Haradinaj and his group.

== From soldier to politician ==
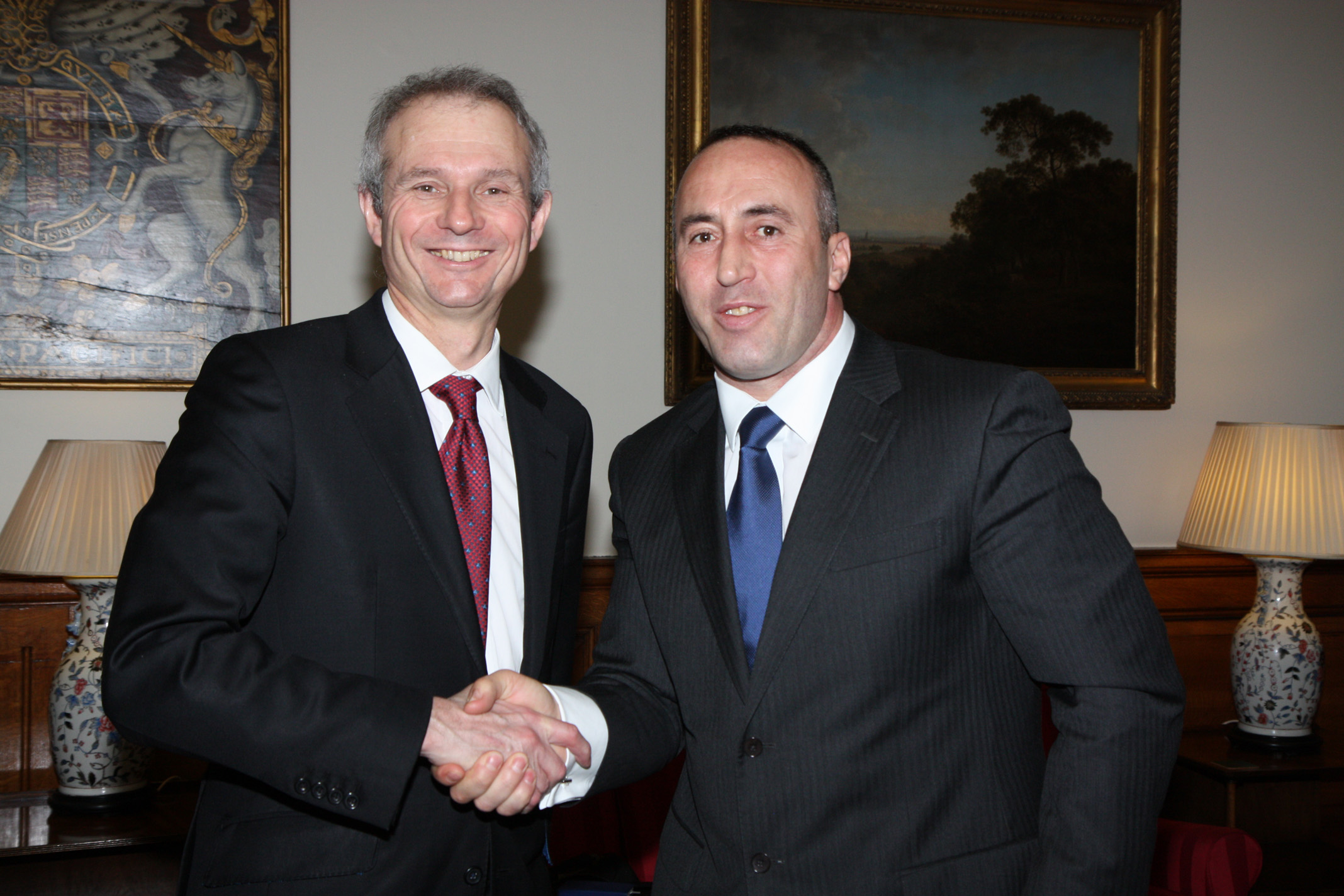
Haradinaj with British Minister for Europe David Lidington, 11 February 2013

After demilitarization of the KLA following NATO's entry into Kosovo in 1999, the KLA was transformed into the Kosovo Protection Corps (KPC). In this new force, Haradinaj was appointed a deputy commander, under Agim Çeku.

He retired from the KPC in April 2000, and announced that he was entering politics. With support from the former communist leader Mahmut Bakalli, Haradinaj founded the Alliance for the Future of Kosovo (AAK) in May 2000. He was elected president of the party.

Following the Kosovo elections of October 2004, Haradinaj entered into coalition talks with the LDK, led by Dr. Rugova, then President of Kosovo. Rugova formed a government and nominated Haradinaj as Prime Minister. In the Kosovo Assembly, Haradinaj's candidacy for prime minister won the support of 72 members out of 120, with only three opposing.

Haradinaj worked with Ibrahim Rugova and other senior figures in the LDK. The PDK opposed Haradinaj's coalition with the Rugova-led LDK.

In February 2009 the Ugandan Muslim rebel group Allied Democratic Forces asked Haradinaj to mediate peace talks with the central government in Kampala.

On 10 November 2012, Albanian President Bujar Nishani decorated Haradinaj with the Skanderbeg's Order.

Following the elections in Kosovo in June 2017, Haradinaj was elected Prime Minister of Kosovo on 9 September 2017 as leader of the PANA coalition (PDK-AAK-Nisma-AKR) which also includes Kosovo's ethnic minorities.

== Trial for war crimes at ICTY ==
=== First trial ===
Haradinaj served 100 days as prime minister in 2005 before being indicted for war crimes by the International Criminal Tribunal for the former Yugoslavia (ICTY), at The Hague. The indictment alleges that Haradinaj, as a commander of the KLA, committed crimes against humanity and violations of the laws or customs of war between March and September 1998, the alleged purpose of which was to exert control over territory, targeting both Serb, Albanian, and Romani civilians. He was acquitted on 3 April 2008, because of lack of convincing evidence.

When the ICTY indictment was issued in March 2005, Haradinaj chose to step down immediately from his position as prime minister. The following day he travelled voluntarily to The Hague where he submitted himself to the custody of the court and remained for two months until he was granted provisional release pending trial. The head of the United Nations Interim Administration Mission in Kosovo (UNMIK) during this time, Søren Jessen-Petersen, welcomed the decision Haradinaj to face the tribunal voluntarily, praised his work and described Haradinaj as a "close partner and friend", despite Western intelligence reports that Haradinaj was a key figure in the range between organized crime and politics. Citing Mr. Haradinaj's compliance with the ICTY and the fact that he posed no risk of flight and no risk towards witnesses, the Trial Chamber of the ICTY extended his provisional release and allowed him to wait for trial in his hometown of Prishtina. Further, the Appeals Chamber later granted Haradinaj the unprecedented right for an indictee to engage in public political activity. Such activity was, however, subject to the approval of UNMIK. This step was unprecedented in the history of international criminal law and seen as a reflection of the fact that Mr. Haradinaj voluntarily submitted himself to the court. Critics (and the prosecution), however, argued that this went too far. The prosecution argued that although Mr. Haradinaj posed no threat to witnesses, his mere presence in Kosovo could have a "chilling" effect on whether witnesses would testify.

On 26 February 2007 Haradinaj was flown back to Hague so that the trial could proceed. In the previous days he held meetings with Kosovo's President Fatmir Sejdiu, Prime Minister Agim Çeku, the head of the United Nations Mission in Kosovo Joachim Rücker, and various diplomatic offices. At a news conference he urged the public to remain calm and was steadfast in his belief that the trial would result in a full acquittal.

The longtime Chief Prosecutor of International Criminal Tribunal for the former Yugoslavia (ICTY), Carla Del Ponte, has remained steadfastly unimpressed by the international support for Haradinaj, continuing to make strongly negative statements about him. She told the German Frankfurter Allgemeine Zeitung that "according to the decision to provisionally release him, he is a stability factor for Kosovo. I never understood this. For me he is a war criminal."

The trial, which was enforced by Carla Del Ponte, began on 5 March 2007 and Haradinaj's defence team was led by Ben Emmerson QC, an international human rights lawyer, who had supporting counsel in Rodney Dixon, also of Matrix Chambers of London. The legal defence team as a whole was coordinated by Irish political consultant and financier Michael O'Reilly. At the opening of proceedings, Carla Del Ponte pointed to the problems of the accuser. The intimidation of witnesses was a major problem in the investigation. She claimed that it was difficult to find witnesses who were willing to testify not just to the prosecutors, but also for the tribunal. "The difficulty in Kosovo was that no one helped us, neither the UN administration nor NATO."

On 20 July 2007, Ramush Haradinaj's application for provisional release during the summer court recess was denied. He was granted a second exceptional provisional release over the Christmas court recess. The trial chamber rendered its decision on 3 April 2008: not guilty. Defenders of Haradinaj, Balaj and Lahi Brahimaj did not take a single witness of the defence to the stand, considering it unnecessary. The prosecution was unable to bring three planned witnesses to the courtroom. One of them was committed to a mental health institution at the time he was called to testify. Another, Shefqet Kabashi, refused to testify citing the prosecution's failure to live up to the conditions set for his testimony.

Haradinaj's full acquittal, however, was palled by whispers that witnesses had been intimidated. In fact, during the first trial two witnesses failed to attend and it was feared their evidence could have been determinative to the outcome. The judges addressed the atmosphere of intimidation that surrounded the trial directly and noted: "the Chamber encountered significant difficulties in securing the testimony of a large number of these witnesses. Many cited fear as a prominent reason for not wishing to appear before the Chamber to give evidence. In this regard, the Chamber gained a strong impression that the trial was being held in an atmosphere where witnesses felt unsafe, due to a number of factors set out in the Judgement."

=== Witness intimidation ===
Because witness intimidation had been such an important issue during the initial trial, witness protection was a prominent feature in both trials. During both trials, the Prosecution took great pains to protect the identity of witnesses called to testify. This often included, voice modification, pseudonyms, and in some cases witness relocation. During the retrial, the Court took the extraordinary measure of moving the entire court to an undisclosed secret location in order to secure the testimony of a protected witness.

The ICTY stated that no witnesses were murdered during either trial. There was some confusion over this point because during the first trial, 97 witnesses were called by the Prosecution to testify against Mr. Haradinaj; however, two did not testify, and one witness died shortly before trial.

Kujtim Berisha died following a traffic crash on 18 February 2007 in Podgorica, Montenegro. Montenegrin police concluded a 67-year-old Montenegrin Serb named Aleksandar Ristović drove his car into Berisha and two other men, killing Berisha. Police "confirmed that at the moment of accident Ristović was drunk-driving at a very high speed" at the time of the crash. Montenegrin investigators found "no evidence that the accident was staged".'".

The ICTY Tribunal confirmed this noting: "The (ICTY) tribunal noted that Kujtim Berisha was '"the only person [who died] who was planned to be called as a witness in the Haradinaj et al. trial." He died in a 2007 car accident in Podgorica.

Various media outlets from several different countries have written that as many as nineteen people who were supposed to be witnesses in the trial against Haradinaj were murdered. The ICTY disputed these reports.

The first time the ICTY formally refuted this rumor was shortly after the initial trial. Serbian media claimed that Haradinaj's acquittal was based on the "mafia style killing of witnesses". The ICTY spokeswoman in Serbia, Nerma Jelačić, stated that these allegations were untrue and served only to politicize the work of the court. Her statement was later echoed and reaffirmed by the ICTY Trial Chamber itself which commented that no witnesses in the protected witness program were killed during the initial trial.

A Serbian prosecutor claimed that potential ICTY witnesses had been murdered in 2011. The ICTY refuted his statement and shortly thereafter the ICTY's war crimes prosecutor responded to these allegations and claimed again that no ICTY witnesses had been murdered. Two of the individuals listed by the Serbian Prosecutor (Sadik and Vesel Muriqi) turned out to still be alive.

=== Second trial ===
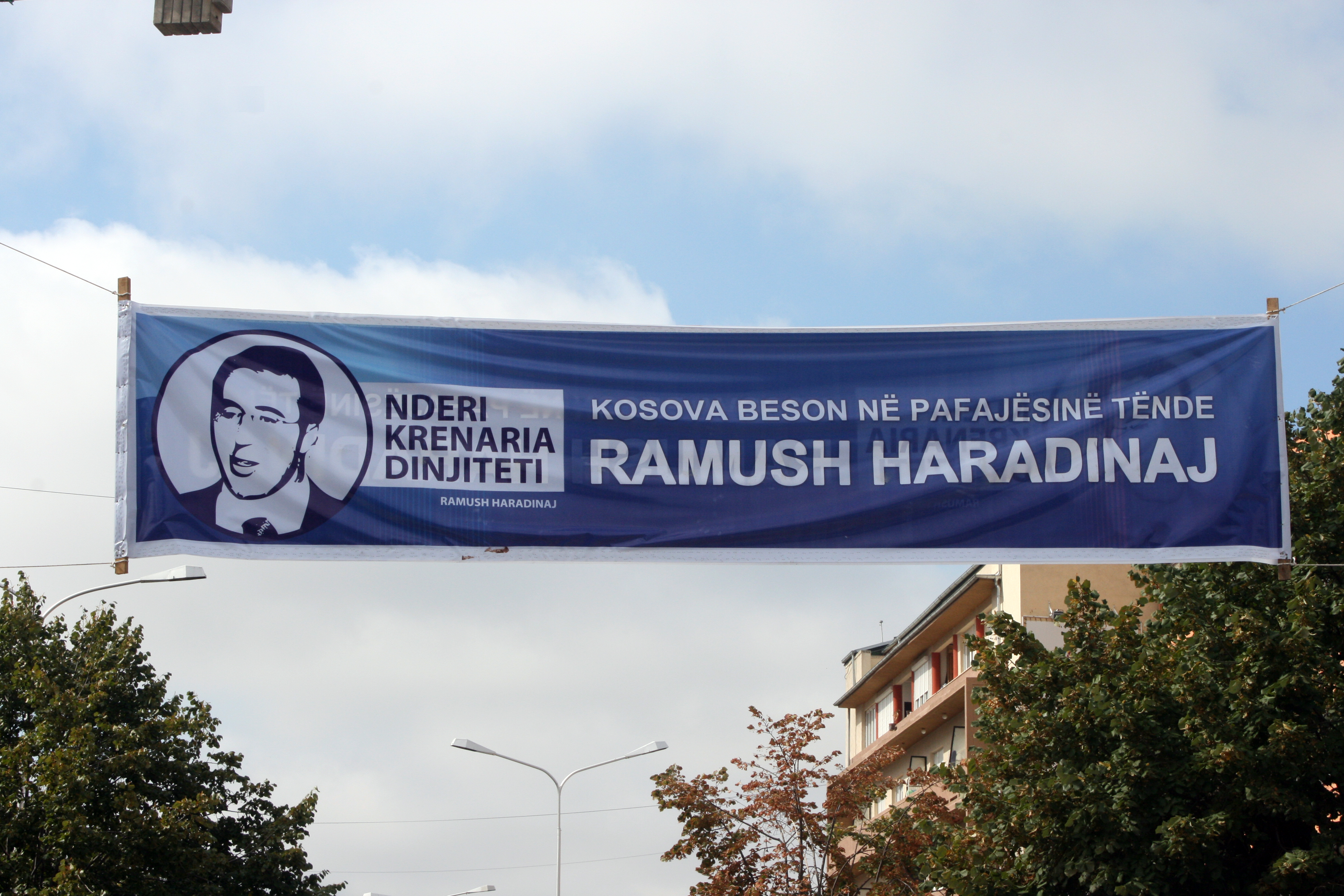
Banner showing support for Haradinaj in the streets of Pristina, September 2010

The second trial began on 18 August 2011 in front of a second Trial Chamber made up of three different judges. Haradinaj was represented again by Ben Emmerson QC, Rodney Dixon QC and Andrew Strong. The Prosecution called 56 witnesses against Haradinaj and again Haradinaj called no defense witness.

On 29 November 2012, Haradinaj was acquitted a second time. This time, due to the extreme diligence of the court and of the parties there was no allegation of witness intimidation. Instead the judges found that not only was there no evidence to convict Haradinaj, the Court held that the evidence established that he had acted to prevent criminal behaviour where he could.

The central allegation against Haradinaj was that he participated in a criminal plan to persecute civilians. The Court directly addressed this allegation and stated in its summary of the judgment that:

Even if the existence of such common plan were established, which is not the finding of the Chamber, there is nothing in the evidence to indicate that Ramush Haradinaj or Idriz Balaj may have been involved in any such common plan. On the contrary, the evidence establishes that when Ramush Haradinaj found out about the detention and mistreatment of Skender Kuçi, he went to Jabllanicë/Jablanica to speak to Nazmi Brahimaj regarding Skender Kuçi's release, telling him that "no such thing should happen anymore because this is damaging our cause". When Witness 3 was brought to Ramush Haradinaj after his escape from Jabllanicë/Jablanica and subsequent apprehension by Lahi Brahimaj, Ramush Haradinaj offered food and accommodation to Witness 3 and released him to his family. No credible evidence has been presented by the Prosecution to establish that Ramush Haradinaj was even aware of the crimes committed at the KLA compound in Jabllanicë/Jablanica.

After this ruling, there were serious questions raised as to why Haradinaj was ever indicted in the first place. Indeed, Lord Madonald of River Glaven QC, a former Director of Public Prosecutions for England and Wales, said: "This prosecution was a stupid attempt to equate resistance with aggression. It was an embarrassment to the international community." The governments of both Albania and Kosovo have demanded a public inquiry into the behavior of the Chief Prosecutor, Carla Del Ponte, over her conduct in bringing this indictment forward.

Geoffrey Nice, the ICTY prosecutor in the Milošević case, wrote in a column in Koha Ditore that at least three experienced prosecution lawyers advised Del Ponte against indicting Ramush Haradinaj since it could not be proved he was guilty. One of those lawyers was Andrew T. Cayley QC, one of the most esteemed lawyers at the Tribunal and currently the Chief Prosecutor at the Cambodian Tribunal. He stated that he felt increasing pressure to bring the case despite an acute lack of evidence. Sir Geoffrey Nice QC commented that the pressure to bring the case against Ramush Haradinaj stemmed from the lead Prosecutor at the time, Carla Del Ponte and he speculated that she wanted to use the indictment against Haradinaj as a "coin" to trade with Belgrade in order to convince the Serbian Government to hand over its high-profile war criminal fugitives, Radovan Karadžić and Ratko Mladić.

After a thorough review of the initial evidence, Andrew T. Cayley QC wrote to the Chief Prosecutor at the time in which he told her that the prosecution could not proceed on the evidence it had. That report was immediately discarded and Cayley was reprimanded for his views. As a result of the manner in which the chief prosecutor ignored Cayley's advice and pursued the indictment against Haradinaj, three senior prosecutors Geoffery Nice QC, Andrew T Cayley QC and Mark Harmon left the office of the Prosecutor.

On 25 April 2008, the ICTY officially opened indictments against Astrit Haraqija and his councilor Bajrush Morina for contempt of court in Haradinaj's case. On 23 July 2009 Astrit Haraqija was acquitted of all charges by the Appeals Chamber. The Court sentenced Bajrush Morina to three months imprisonment for attempting to obstruct a witness from testifying. In rendering its sentence the court acknowledged that there were no aggravating factors that should increase the sentence. The sentence did have mitigating factors, however. These included the fact that the witness Morina was convicted of intimidating stated that the conversation occurred in a "friendly atmosphere", that he never felt threatened or intimidated, and that Bajrush Morina apologized to the witness immediately after speaking to him and before he was arrested.

In 2009, The Trial, a feature-length documentary on Haradinaj's trial at the ICTY, was produced and released. The film premiered at the Galway Film Fleadh in 2009.

== Arrests in Slovenia and in France ==
In June 2015 Haradinaj was arrested by Slovene police but was released after two days following diplomatic pressure.

On 5 January 2017 Haradinaj was arrested on a Serbian arrest warrant by French border police upon his arrival at EuroAirport Basel Mulhouse Freiburg on a flight from Pristina. Serbian authorities urged France to extradite Haradinaj urgently, citing that he "personally took part in the torture, murder, and rape of civilians". The director of the Serbian Office for Kosovo and Metohija, Marko Đurić, said that he was "surprised that Serbia is criticized for something while a criminal like this is free". He added that: "Serbia is sending out a warning that it does not accept fake justice, according to which killings and crimes are allowed if they're in the interest of great powers. As France acts on Serbia's warrants, so we will act on theirs." Serbian Justice Minister, Nela Kuburović, said that: "The entire international community is under an obligation to prosecute war crimes suspects."

In reaction to this event, U.S. Representative Eliot Engel stated:

"This is not about the rule of law and justice. International courts have freed Mr. Haradinaj twice. This action only increases tensions and increases the possibility of future conflicts. I call on the judicial authorities of France to accelerate the procedure and the release of Mr. Haradinaj as soon as possible".

He also stated that "Serbia is abusing the red Interpol notice and thus substantially violating this commitment. The EU should not promote the accession of Serbia until it returns to the path of normalization of relations with Kosovo".

On 27 April 2017, a French court turned down a Serbian request to extradite Ramush Haradinaj and released him.

== Second premiership (2017–2020) ==
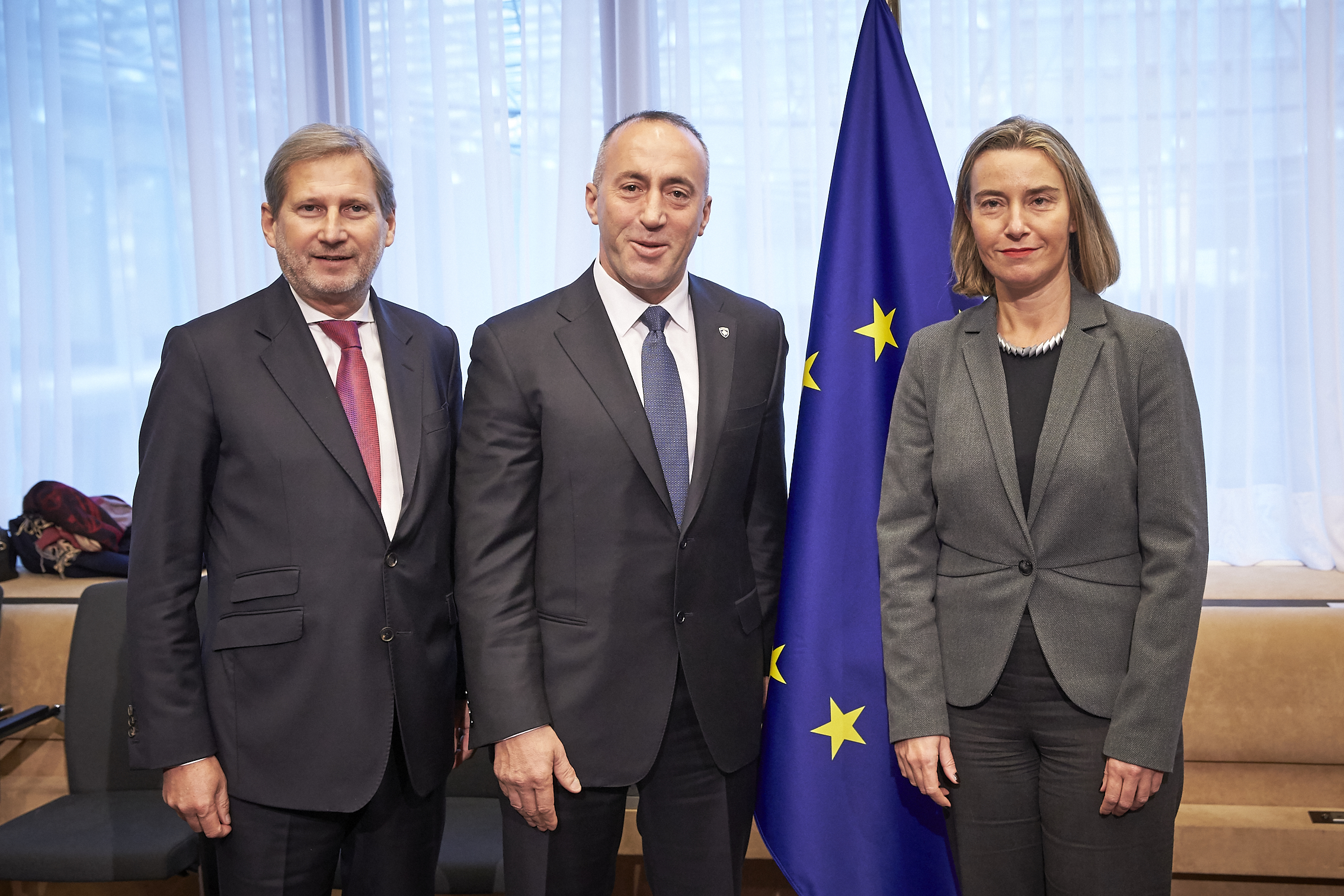
From left to right: European Commissioner Johannes Hahn, Haradinaj and European Commission Vice-President Federica Mogherini, 17 November 2017

Following the 11 June 2017 elections, Haradinaj was elected as the Prime Minister of Kosovo on 9 September 2017, with 61 votes for and 1 abstention after a long political crisis. The rest of the 58 MPs boycotted the vote. His government consisted of a coalition, named the PANA Coalition.

In 2018, after Kosovo president Hashim Thaçi and Serbian president Aleksandar Vučić expressed support for a land swap between Kosovo and Serbia, Haradinaj stated that any change of the Kosovo border with Serbia would lead to war.

On 26 November 2019, an earthquake struck Albania. As outgoing prime minister, Haradinaj allocated a sum of €500,000 from Kosovo to Albania for the relief effort. Haradinaj visited Durrës to survey the damage and expressed Kosovan commitment to relief efforts.

Albanian PM Edi Rama and Haradinaj had a clash in late 2019 due to different views on the Mini-Schengen initiative. Rama stated that Haradinaj "lies due to ignorance or on purpose". In 2020 Rama filed a lawsuit for defamation against Haradinaj.

=== Resignation ===
On 19 July 2019, Haradinaj resigned after being summoned for questioning by the Specialist Prosecutor's Office in The Hague. He said that he "could not be Kosovo's prime minister and a suspect at the same time". Similar scenarios occurred in April 2008, where he was acquitted by the ICTY due to "lack of proof", and in November 2012 by the UN tribunal.

== Presidential bid ==
On 12 August 2020, Haradinaj announced that he would run for president.

In a press release, the steering council of the Alliance for the Future of Kosovo, AAK, said it had "authorized party leader Haradinaj to hold any talks on behalf of the Alliance on the eventual reconfiguration of the government, including the issue of the president if this is on the agenda. "The Steering Council has also requested ... that in these talks, the candidate for president should be Haradinaj", it added. On Facebook, Haradinaj said he felt honoured by the party's decision to entrust him with this goal. "I consider the trust that I will be the candidate for president, if this is discussed ... a high responsibility and special honour", he wrote.

In 2021, Haradinaj stated that the EU might drive Kosovo to unite with Albania. President of Serbia Aleksandar Vučić commented that Haradinaj's statement is "a threat to the whole region" and that Serbia would have an adequate answer to such actions. The European Commission stated that "Political leaders in the region should set an example in promoting a climate of mutual trust".

== 2025 Parliamentary Election ==
In the 2025 Kosovo parliamentary elections, Ramush Haradinaj ran with the Alliance for the Future of Kosovo (AAK). The election resulted in Vetëvendosje securing the largest share of the vote with approximately 40%, while AAK received around 7.2% of the vote while in a coalition with NISMA.

== Countries visited ==
List of state visits made by Haradinaj during his term as prime minister:

	Country	Date	Cities visited	Type of visit
1	Albania	27.09.2017	Tirana	State visit
2	Belgium	17.11.2017	Brussels	EU visit
3	United States	08.02.2018	Washington, D.C.	State visit
4	United Kingdom	26.02.2018	London	State visit
5	Slovenia	24.04.2018	Kranj	SEECP Summit
6	United States	24.09.2018	New York City	Working visit
7	Poland	04.07.2019	Poznań	Berlin Process Summit

== Controversies ==
In spring 2000, Ramush Haradinaj was involved in a fist fight with Russian soldiers at a KFOR checkpoint, and later that year was involved in a shootout in Strellc i Epërm with Sadik Musaj, member of the Musaj family (members of the FARK), which was covered up by US officials of Camp Bondsteel. He was injured, and sent by a US helicopter to Germany, while the location, long from US area of responsibility, was cleansed of evidence.

It is alleged that he beat the soldiers under his command in order to maintain discipline, and was described as "a psychopath" by one of his former soldiers.

== Family and personal life ==
Haradinaj's ancestors originated from Iballë, Pukë in Northern Albania, who later then migrated to Kosovo. His father, mother and remaining family member still reside in the family home in the community of Glodjane. Ramush Haradinaj is currently married to the RTK news reporter Anita Haradinaj; they have three young children, two boys and one girl.

Haradinaj has five brothers. Two of them, Luan Haradinaj and Shkelzën Haradinaj, were killed as members of the KLA during the fights with the Serbian security forces. In December 2002, Haradinaj's brother Daut was sentenced by a UN court in Kosovo for his involvement in the kidnapping and murder of four Kosovo Albanians, who belonged to the FARK, an armed formation of Kosovo Albanians and rivals of the KLA, to five years in prison. Enver Haradinaj, another brother of Ramush, was assassinated in April 2005 in a drive-by shootout in Kosovo. According to the UN security forces, there was a confrontation between rival Kosovo-Albanian clans. The youngest brother Frashër was still a student as of 2007 and worked in the service of the now former Provisional Institutions of Self-Government. His other brother Daut Haradinaj is today also a politician.

Haradinaj does not consider himself as a Muslim. He declared, "For generations my family members were Catholics. I do not know why I am Muslim. I've never been in a mosque, nor ask for anything else". In an interview in Rubicon, Haradinaj expressed that "My religion is Albanianism, the best religion in the world."

Haradinaj, a citizen of Albania, is an Albanian patriot and nationalist, and has called for further intensification of relations between the two countries.

He speaks Serbian, having used it in interviews and speeches to the Kosovo Serb community, according to himself, to "show respect".

Political offices
Preceded by Bajram Rexhepi	Prime Minister of Kosovo; 2004–2005	Succeeded by Adem Salihaj; Acting
Preceded by Isa Mustafa	Prime Minister of Kosovo; 2017–2020	Succeeded by Albin Kurti
