= Strellc i Ulët =

Strellc i Ulët: Strellc i Ulët (Albanian); Доњи Стреоц/Donji Streoc (Serbian)
- Village
- Location within Kosovo
- Coordinates: 42°34′50″N 20°18′58″E
- Location: Kosovo
- District: Gjakova
- Municipality: Deçan
- Elevation: 567 m (1,860 ft)

Population (2024)
  - Total: 1,425
- Time zone: UTC+1 (CET)
  - Summer (DST): UTC+2 (CEST)

Strellc i Ulët (in Albanian) or Donji Streoc (Serbian Cyrillic: Доњи Стреоц), is a village in the Deçan municipality of western Kosovo, located between Deçan and Peć along the mountainous border with Albania. The majority of inhabitants are ethnic Albanians.
