= Hero of Kosovo Order =

Hero of Kosovo
- Awarded for: State decoration given to historical figures and citizens of Kosovo who have contributed to freedom and independence.
- Country: Kosovo
- Presented by: President of Kosovo
- Ribbon
- Established: 2009

Hero of Kosovo (Albanian: Urdhri Hero i Kosovës) is an official order in Kosovo. It is awarded by the President of Kosovo.

== Award ==
"Hero of Kosovo" is a state decoration given to historical figures of Kosovo starting from the League of Prizren and beyond, as well as citizens of Kosovo who have contributed to freedom and independence. The medal includes the portrait of Skanderbeg. It is crafted in gold.

It is awarded by the President of Kosovo, though the nomination might also come from: Chairman of the Assembly, Prime Minister, President of the Supreme Court and the Electoral College, Chief Prosecutor of Kosovo, Minister, Chief of General Staff, General Director of Police, President of the Municipal Assembly, and President of the Academy of Sciences and Arts.

- Adem Demaçi
- Adem Jashari
- Adrian Krasniqi
- Afrim Bunjaku
- Afrim S. Gashi
- Agim Ramadani
- Agim Shala
- Ahmet Haxhiu
- Bahri Fazliu
- Bekim Berisha
- Beqir Sadiku
- Besnik Lajçi
- Ekrem Rexha
- Enver Zymberi
- Hakif Zejnullahu
- Hamëz Jashari
- Ibrahim Rugova
- Idriz Seferi
- Isa Boletini
- Ismet Asllani
- Ismet Jashari
- Luan Haradinaj
- Njazi Azemi
- Sadri Toverlani
- Sali Çekaj
- Selman Kadria
- Shaban Polluzha
- Shemsi Ahmeti
- Shkelzën Haradinaj
- Tahir Zemaj
- Xhemajl Metë Fetahaj
- Zahir Pajaziti

== See also ==
- Outline of Kosovo
- List of awards for contributions to society
- State decorations
- Politics of Kosovo
