= Prilep, Kosovo =

Prilep: Prejlepi (Albanian); Прилеп/Prilep (Serbian)
- Village
- Interactive map of Prilep
- Location within Kosovo
- Country: Kosovo
- District: Gjakova
- Municipality: Deçan

Population (2024)
  - Total: 1,142
- Time zone: UTC+1 (Central European Time)
  - Summer (DST): UTC+2 (CEST)

Prilep (Serbian Cyrillic: Прилеп), or Prejlep (Albanian: Prejlepi, other names: Prilep, Përlep, Perlep, Prilip) or Arrnjet (Albanian: Arrnjeti), is a village situated in western Kosovo^{[a]}, close to Gjakova.

== Kosovo War ==
During the Kosovo War in 1998 the village was nearly completely destroyed. Militants of the Kosovo Liberation Army and Serbian forces fought each other near Prilep on the 2nd August 1998, where two Serbian Policemen were killed and the KLA pushed out of the village. The Serbian paramilitary gained control of the contested road connecting Gjakova and Pejë. Using a multi-barrel anti-aircraft gun mounted on top of an armoured vehicle, the Serbian paramilitary made their way through the devastated village house by house. 12 members of the Yugoslav forces and 4 Albanian militants died during the Serbian offensive.

After the village fell in the hands of the Serbian forces, 4 civilians were killed of which 3 were Albanian and 1 was Egyptian. The village mosque that was built in 1686 was also subsequently destroyed.

== Demographics ==
In the 1485 Ottoman defter of the Sanjak of Scutari the village of Prilep is mentioned to have had 28 tax paying households.

In the beginning of the 19th century, there were only about 5 to 10 houses, while today there are over 300.

According to the 2011 census, the resident population was 2,165, of which 2,157 are Albanians, 6 Egyptians and 2 others. The village is inhabited by 2,163 Muslims and 2 others.

The last census of 2024, showed that the village has a population of 1,142 inhabitants.
