= Daut Haradinaj =

Kosovar politician (born 1978)

- Born: Daut Hilmi Haradinaj; 6 April 1978 (age 48); Deçan, SFR Yugoslavia (today Kosovo)
- Military career
- Allegiance: (Republic of Kosova)
- Branch: Kosovo Liberation Army; National Liberation Army; Kosovo Protection Corps
- Service years: 1997–2004
- Conflicts: Insurgency in Kosovo (1995–98); Kosovo War

Daut Haradinaj (born 6 April 1978) is a Kosovar Albanian politician, the brother of Ramush Haradinaj, and former Kosovo Liberation Army (KLA) member during the Kosovo War (1998–99). He was part of the leadership in the Kosovo Protection Corps.

Haradinaj was born on 6 April 1978, as one of nine children, in the village of Gllogjan, near Deçan, in the Kosovo province that was part of the Socialist Republic of Serbia and Socialist Federal Republic of Yugoslavia. His paternal descent is from Berishë in northern Albania, around the city of Pukë.

== Criminal charges ==
In December 2002 Haradinaj was sentenced to five years of prison with five other members of the KLA by a UN court in Kosovo for his involvement in the kidnapping and murder of four members of the Armed Forces of the Republic of Kosova (FARK) and the Democratic League of Kosovo (LDK).
