= Strellci Peak =

Mountain peak in Kosovo

Coordinates: 42.571667°N 20.244722°E

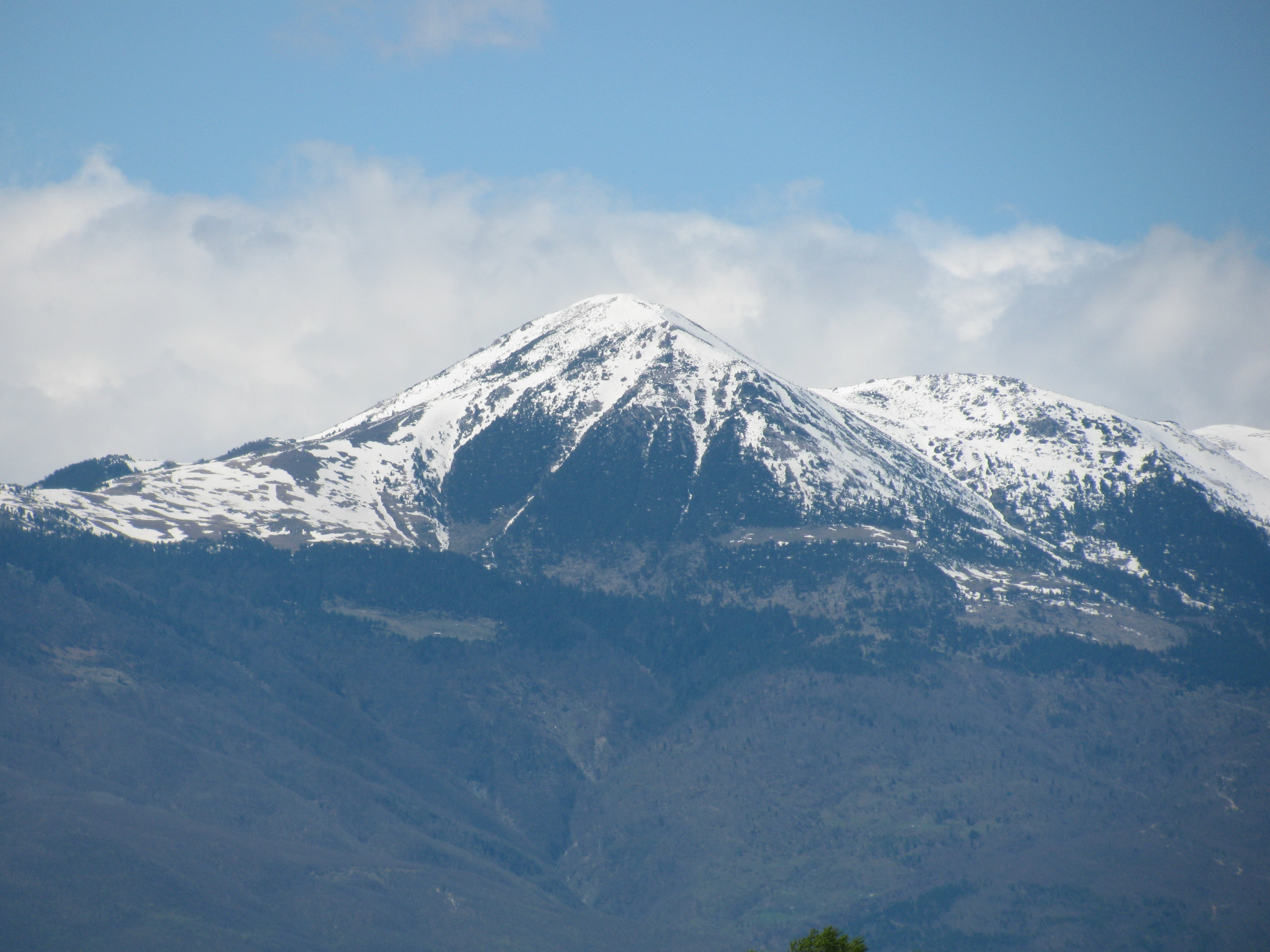

Highest point
- Elevation: 2,377 m (7,799 ft)

Naming
- Native name: Albanian: Maja e Strellcit

Geography
- Location within Kosovo
- Country: Kosovo
- Parent range: Accursed Mountains

Strellci Peak (Albanian: Maja e Strellcit; Serbian: Стреочка планина, Streočka planina) is a mountain peak in the Accursed Mountains range in western Kosovo. To its right are the Plains of Dukagjin. At 2,377-metre-high (7,799 ft) peak, Strellci stands out very well and from the city of Deçan and there is a good view of the whole mountain. The village of Strellc found around the mountain is named after the mountain.

From the town of Klina in the far east of the valley Strellc looks to be even higher than Gjeravica, the highest mountain in Kosovo. The mountain located in Strellc is known to be highly rich in minerals and other valuable materials.

== Gallery ==
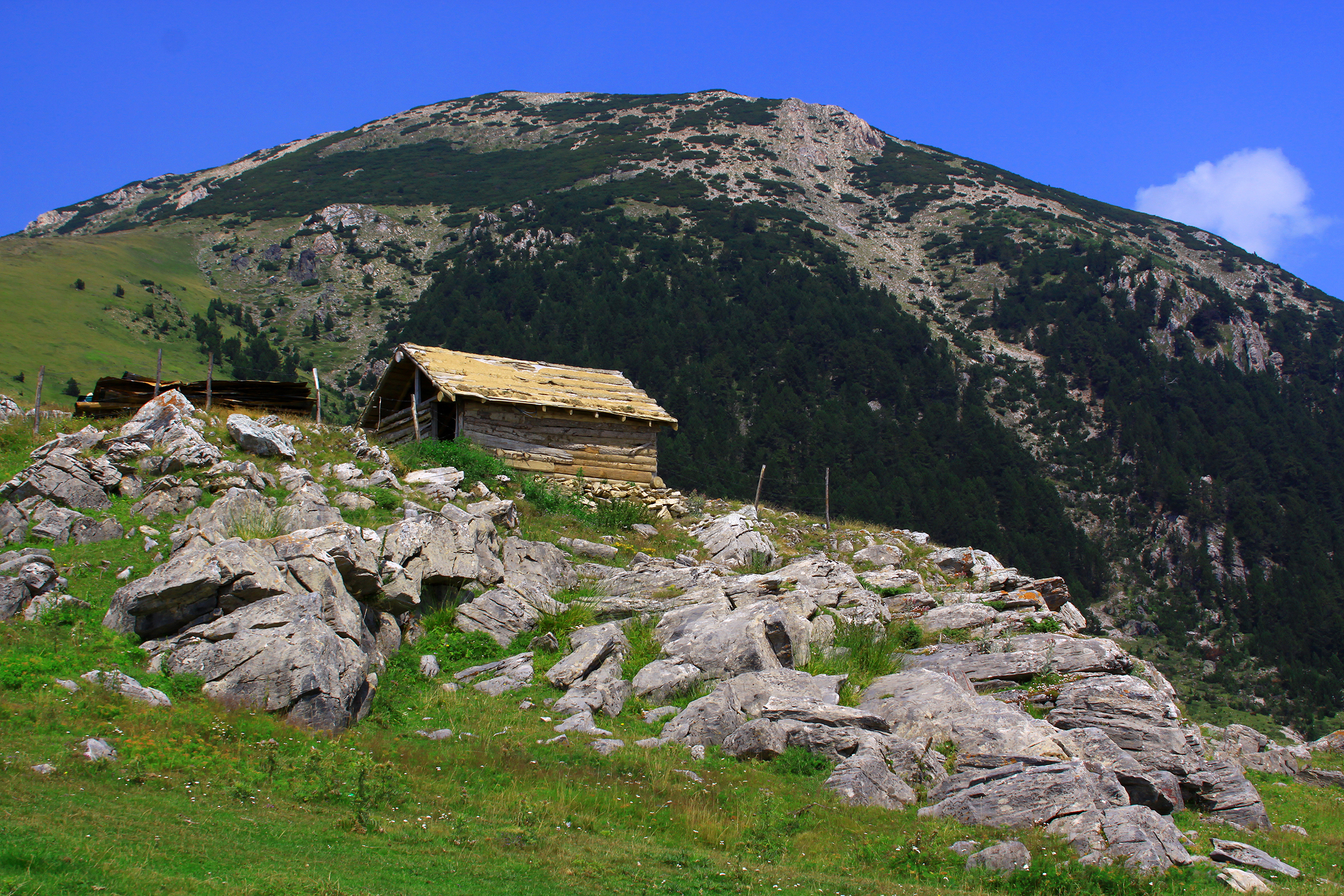

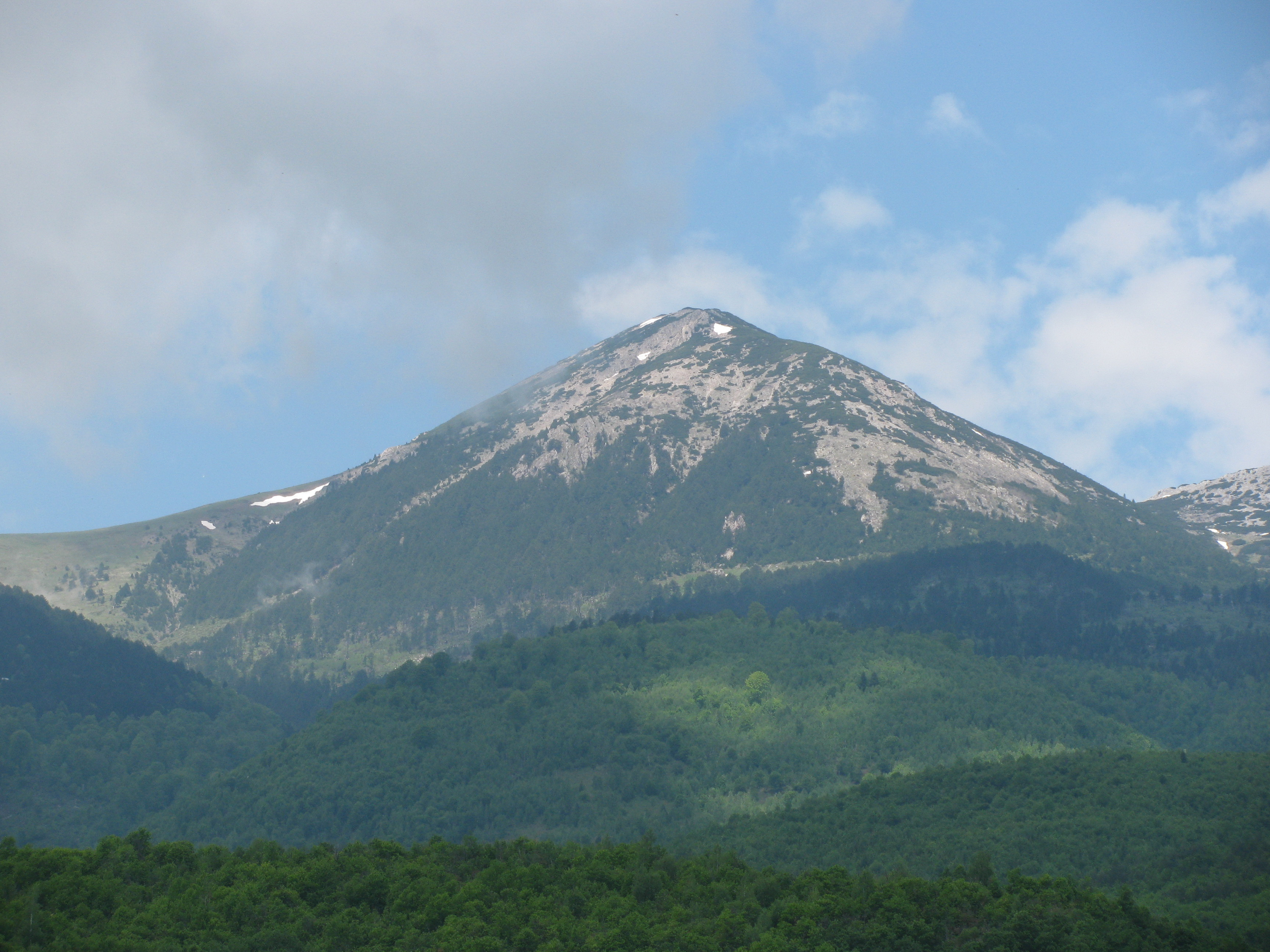

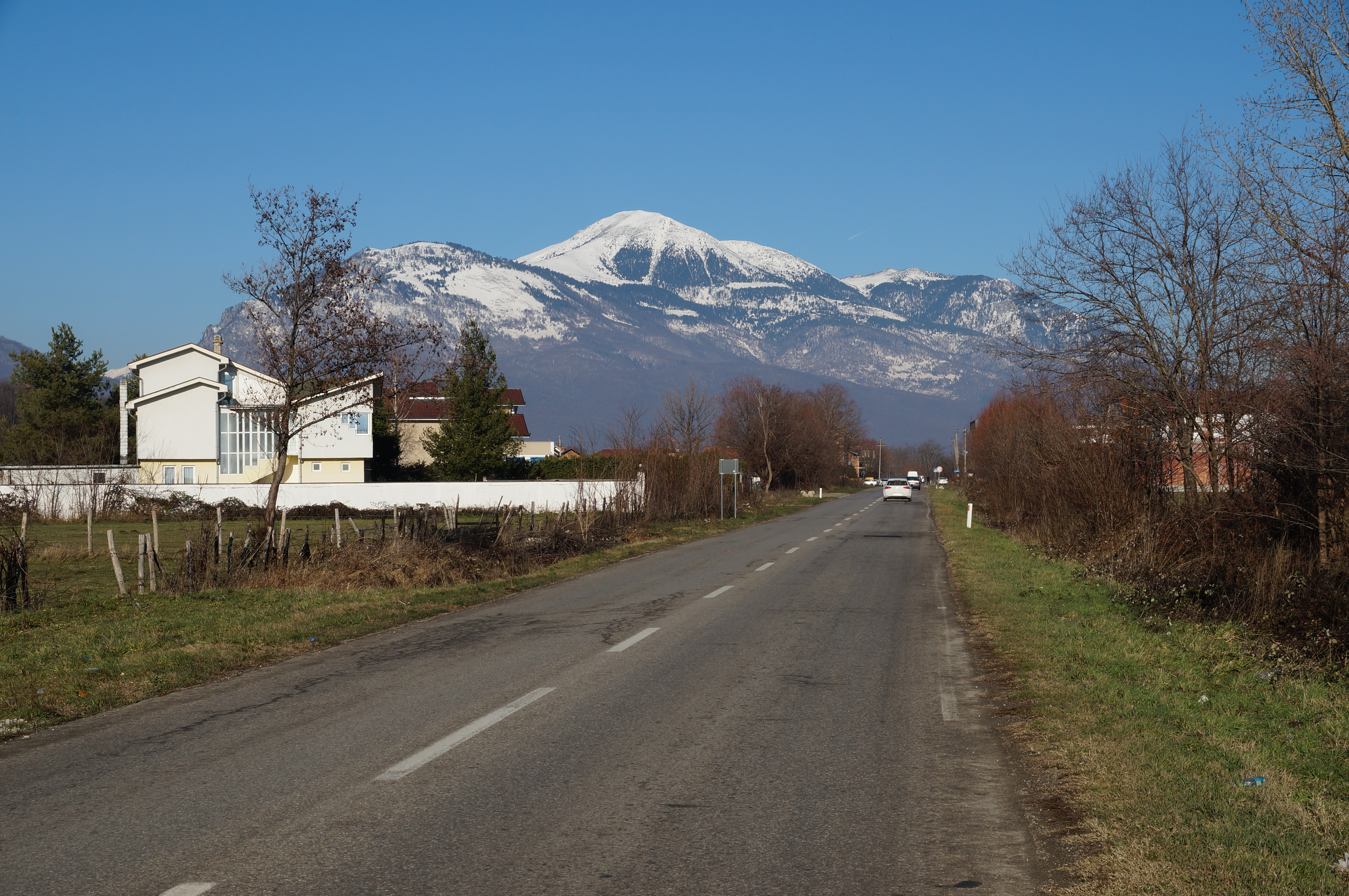

== See also ==
- List of mountains in Kosovo
- National parks of Kosovo
