= Isniq =

Village in Deçan, Kosovo

- Village
- Location within Kosovo
- Coordinates: 42°33′25″N 20°18′10″E
- Country: Kosovo
- District: Peja
- Municipality: Deçan

Population (2024)
  - Total: 2,746
- Time zone: UTC+1 (Central European Time)
  - Summer (DST): UTC+2 (CEST)

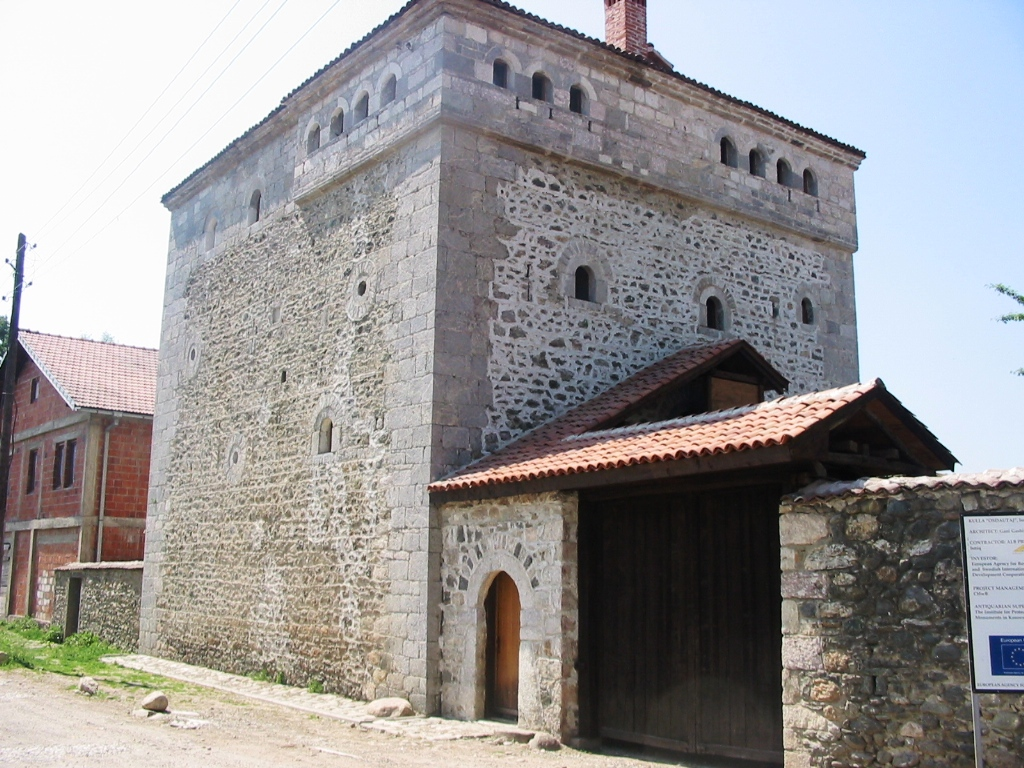
Kulla (Tower) Osdautaj in Isniq village (Kosovo)

Isniq is a village in the municipality of Deçan in Kosovo. As of 2024, the village has a population of 2,746 inhabitants.

== History ==
In the medieval ages, the village was part of the Decani monastic estate and two families ruled it. During the Ottoman era, the village was split into three timars (military estates) led by three knights (timariots). Many inhabitants gradually embraced Islam in the 18th century. Isniq is also mentioned in the Lahuta e Malcis. Throughout history, the Albanian inhabitants in the area lived according to codes of conduct based on the Kanun. The family of Isa Boletini had migrated to Boletin from the village of Isniq due to a blood feud (gjakmarrja). On September 29, 1998, Yugoslav forces gave an ultimatum to the Albanian insurgents in the village to surrender their weapons, and after agreeing to do so, a total of 735 arms were collected.

The Norwegian anthropologist and ethnographer, Berit Backer wrote a book about the region.

== Biodiversity ==
Medicinal plants grow at the mountains of 2656 meters above the sea.
