= Deçan =

Town in Kosovo

Deçan: Deçan or Deçani (Albanian) Dečani or Дечани (Serbian)
- Town and municipality
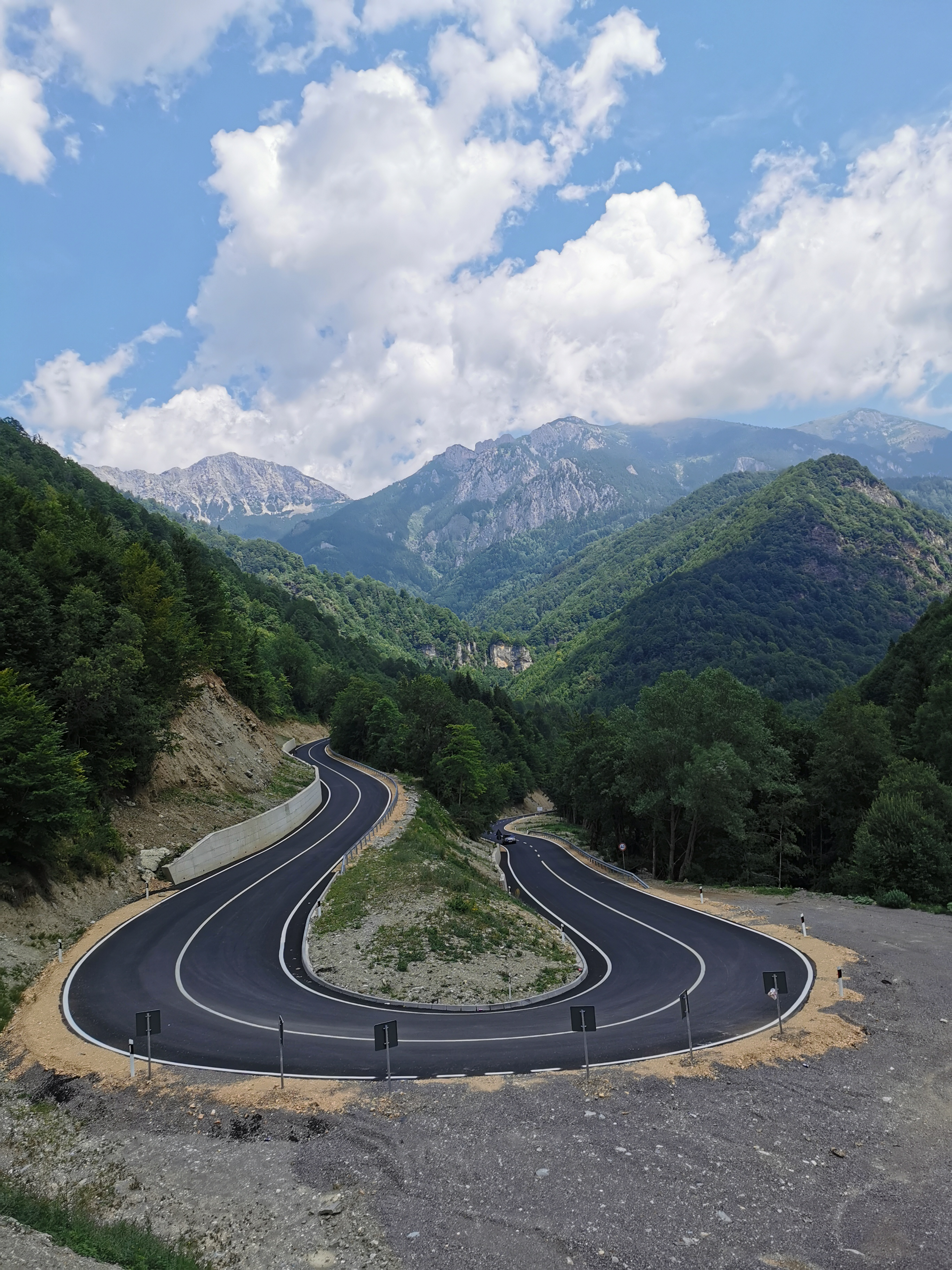

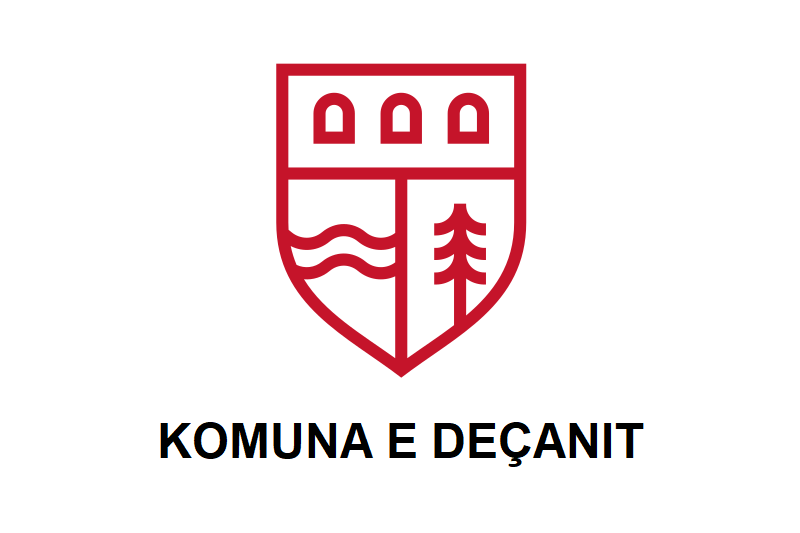
- Flag Seal
- Interactive map of Deçan
- Location within Kosovo
- Coordinates: 42°32′N 20°17′E
- Country: Kosovo
- District: District of Peja
- Municipality: Deçan

Government
  - Mayor: Bashkim Ramosaj (AAK)

Area
  - Municipality: 293.94 km^{2} (113.49 sq mi)
  - Rank: 20th in Kosovo
- Elevation: 610 m (2,000 ft)

Population (2024)
  - Municipality: 27,758
  - Rank: 21st in Kosovo
  - Density: 94.434/km^{2} (244.58/sq mi)
  - Urban: 3,135
  - Ethnicity: 98.45% Albanians; 1.55% Other
- Demonym(s): Albanian: Deçanas (m), Deçanase (f)
- Time zone: UTC+1 (CET)
  - Summer (DST): UTC+1 (CEST)
- Postal code: 51000
- Area code: +383 390
- Vehicle registration: 03
- Website: decan.rks-gov.net

Deçan (pronounced [dɛˈtʃan]; Albanian definite form: Deçani, pronounced [dɛˈtʃani]) or Dečani (Serbian Cyrillic: Дечани, pronounced [dɛ̌t͡ʃani]), is a town and municipality in the district of Peja, Kosovo. The municipality has an area of 293.94 km^{2} (113.49 sq mi) and it includes the town and 37 smaller settlements. According to the last census of 2024, the municipality has a population of 27,775.

== History ==
=== Antiquity ===
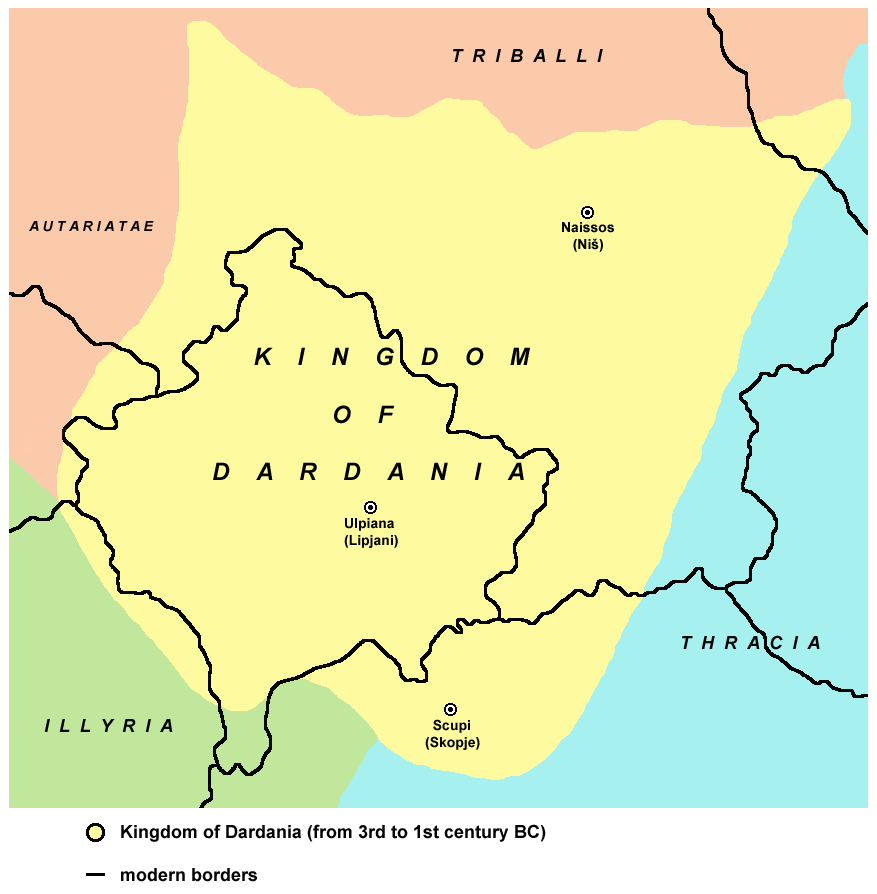
The Kingdom of Dardania, which Deçan was once a part of

Historical records and archaeological evidence indicate that Deçan has been inhabited since ancient times, with organized life established by the Illyrian tribes, particularly the Dardani, who lived in the area. Remnants of this history can be seen in Deçan, where over seven Catholic churches, Illyrian burial mounds, decorative items, stelae, and other artifacts, remain as traces of its past.

=== Middle Ages ===
Deçan was first recorded in 1330 in the decrees known as the Dečani chrysobulls as being a village with a population of 89 households, consisting of 623 people. The village was one of many feudal holdings of the Visoki Dečani monastery. As part of their feudal obligations, the local population of Deçan provided labour and payment in products to the Visoki Dečani monastery.

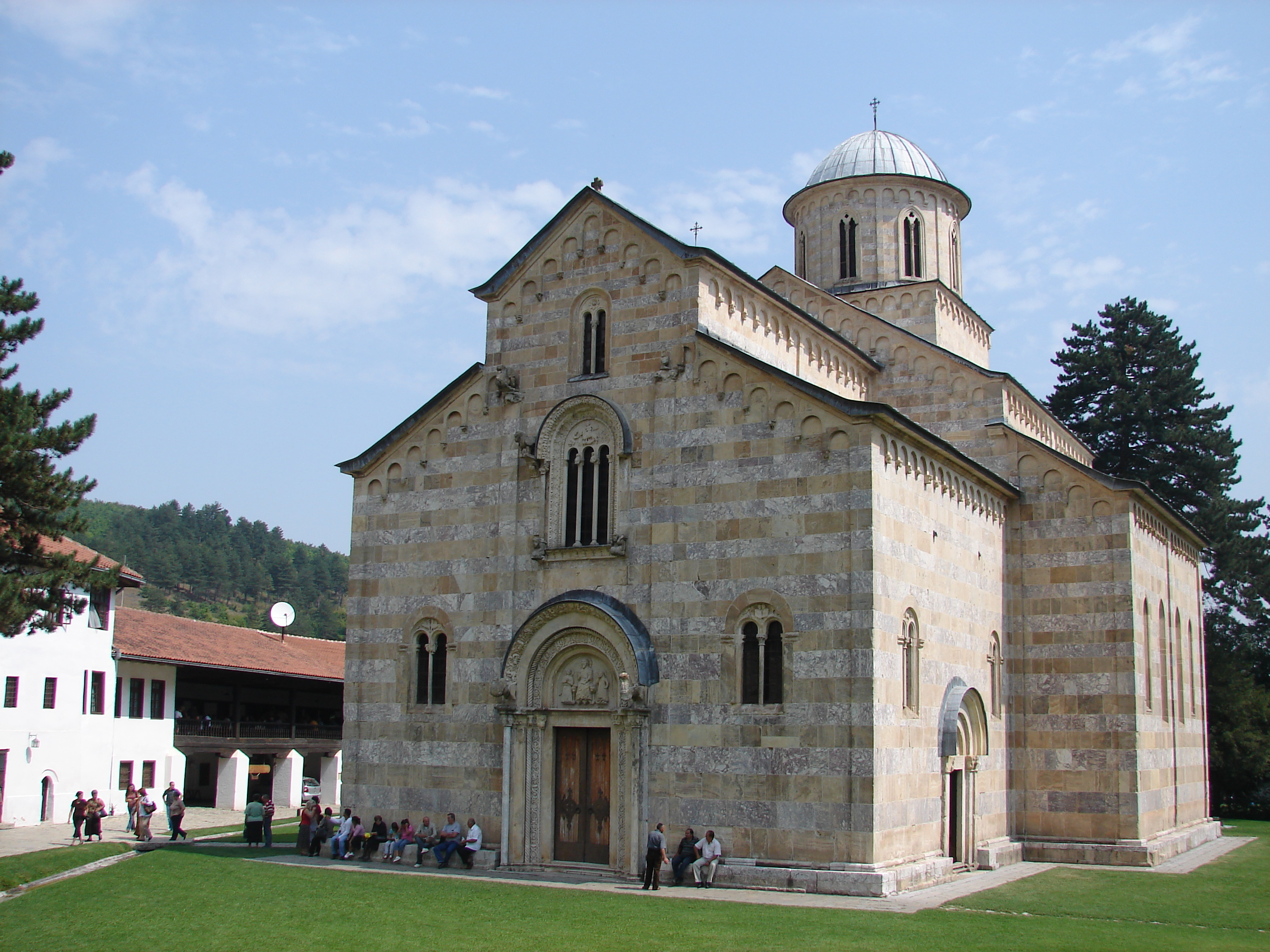
Visoki Dečani monastery was founded in the first half of the 14th century

The chrysobulls listed that Visoki Dečani held such rights over 2,097 households of meropsi (dependent farmers-serfs), 266 Vlach households (pastoral communities) and 69 sokalniki (craftsmen) over a large area in southern Serbia, Kosovo, Montenegro and north Albania. In the charters of Deçan, there were several cases where a father had an Albanian name and his son would have a Serbian name. This has been interpreted as highlighting the process of serbianisation in the region.

Following the migration of the Serbs in the 17th and 18th century, many ethnic Serbs who lived in Deçan left. The local Albanian population of Deçan who remained continued to guard the local Visoki Dečani monastery.

=== Ottoman Period ===
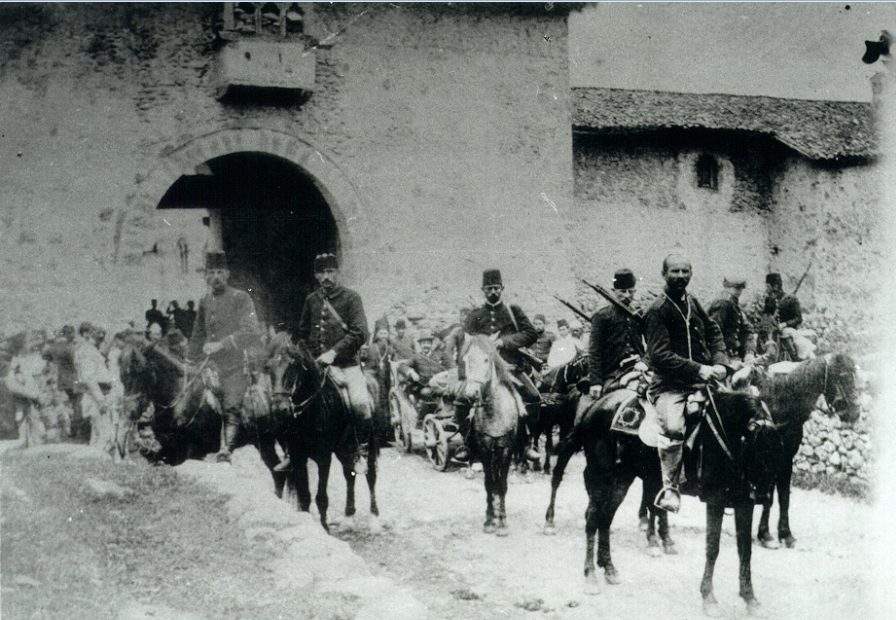
In 1904, Ottoman soldiers (on horses) and some Albanian dukes gathered in front of the gates of the monastery

During the Ottoman era, this region was incorporated into the Sanjak of İpek, with its center in Peja. The area was known for its persistent resistance, particularly throughout the 19th and early 20th centuries. The Albanian League of Prizren in 1878, the League of Peja, and the Pari Assembly in Isniq in April 1910 were significant moments of opposition.

=== World War I ===
In the early stages of World War I, by the end of 1915, Austro-Hungarian rule was established in these territories, remaining in place until 1918. After the Serbo-Montenegrin government reoccupied the region in 1918, a new territorial organization was implemented, consistent with other occupied areas. At that time, Deçan was included in the Peja and Gjakova Districts. In 1929, with administrative and territorial adjustments, the area that is now the Municipality of Deçan was placed within the province of Zeta.

=== World War II ===
During World War II, after the invasion of the Kingdom of Yugoslavia, the Deçan region was initially part of the Italian protectorate of Albania until 1943. After Italy's capitulation, the area came under German control.

=== Socialist Federal Republic of Yugoslavia ===
After World War 2, Deçan, as well as the rest of Socialist Autonomous Province of Kosovo, was a part of SR Serbia and Yugoslavia. At the end of 1959, the district system was dismantled, and the municipal structure was reinforced. Deçan was established as an independent municipality, referred to as the People's Council of the Municipality until 1963. Following constitutional reforms, it was renamed the Assembly of the Municipality of Deçan.

=== Kosovo War ===
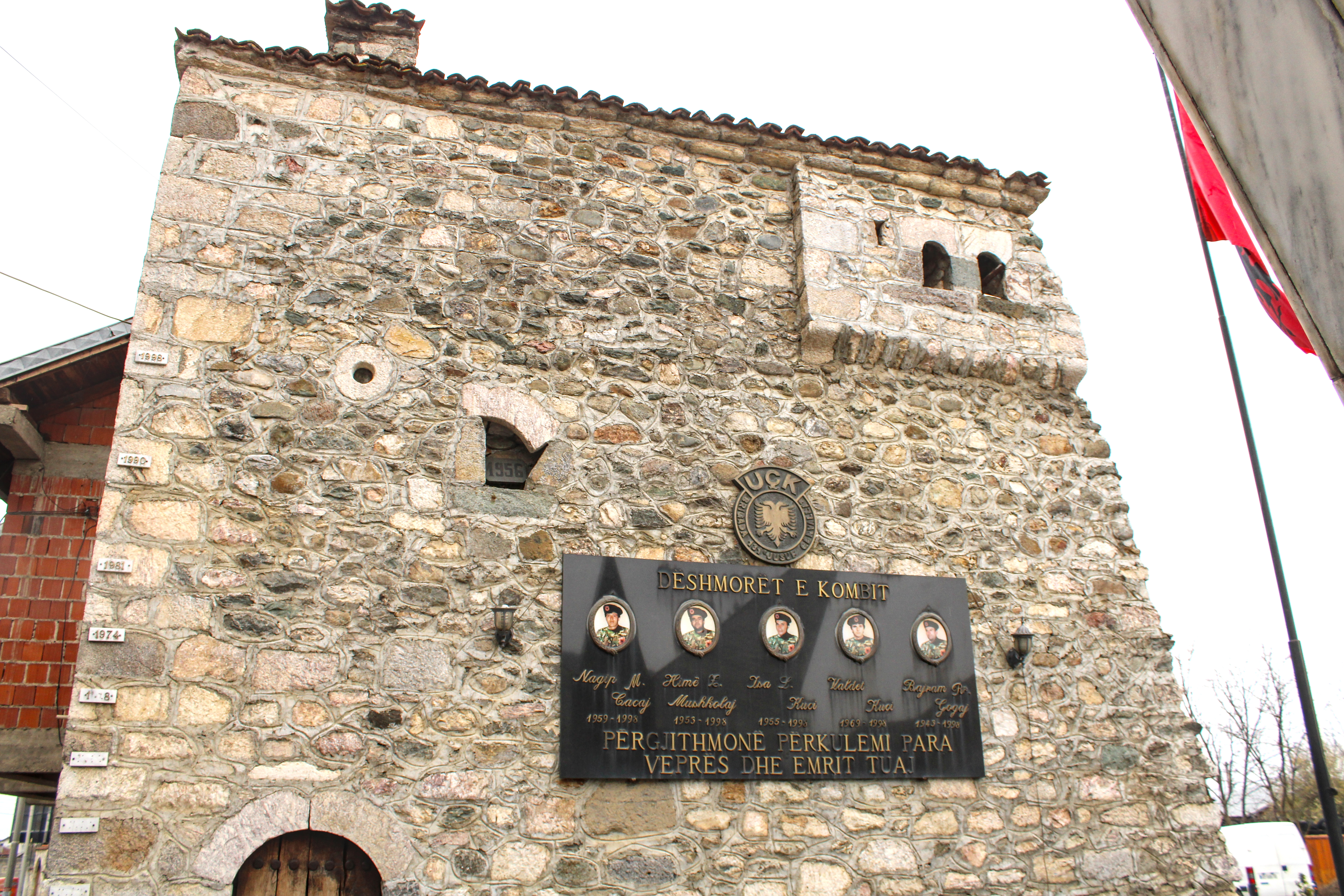
Martyrs' Memorial

During the Kosovo War, Deçan was one of the strongholds of the Kosovo Liberation Army (KLA). The KLA regularly smuggled weapons from Albania across the border to Deçan and as a result, the area saw significant fighting between the KLA and Yugoslav army and police. The town was one of the areas where armed attacks against Serbian police and military began. In August 1995 in one of the most serious incidents before the Kosovo War, the Serbian police stations was attacked and set on fire by an armed group.

== Geography ==
Deçan is located in the western part of Kosovo. It is in the western edge of the Dukagjini field and in the foothills of the Accursed Mountains. It shares the western border with Albania and the northwestern border with Montenegro.

The altitude in the municipality of Deçan varies from the lowest point in the village of Maznik at 412 m (1,352 ft) to the highest point, which is Gjeravica in the Accursed Mountains, reaching 2,656 m (8,714 ft) above sea level.

In addition to Gjeravica, Deçan is home to several other peaks exceeding 2,000 m (6,600 ft), including Marijash (2,533 m (8,310 ft)), Maja e Ropës (2,502 metres (8,209 ft)), Dog's Peak (2,406 m (7,894 ft)) and Strellci Peak (2,377 m (7,799 ft)).

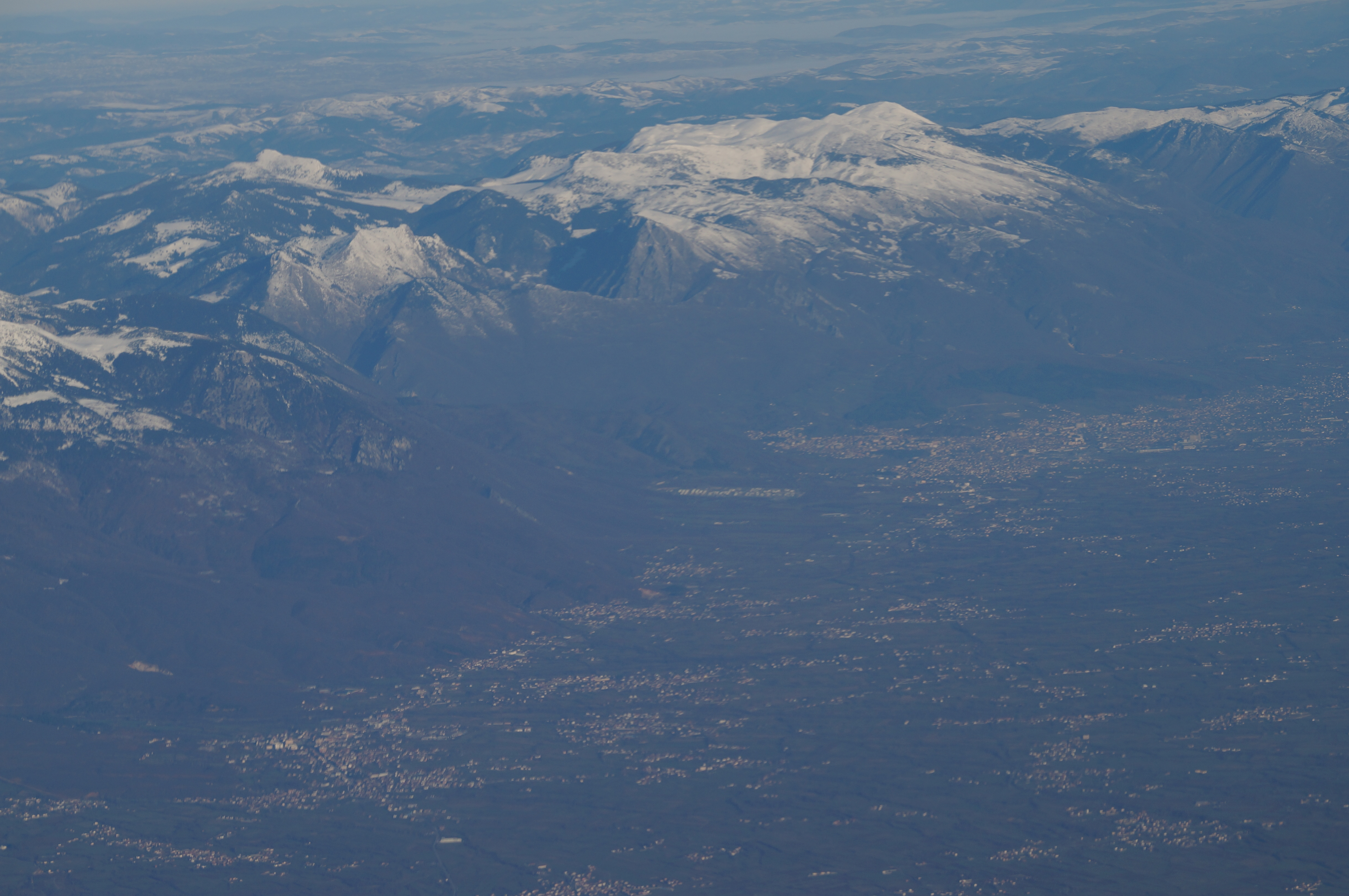
Deçan (bottom), Peja (top) and the Albanian Alps, as seen from above

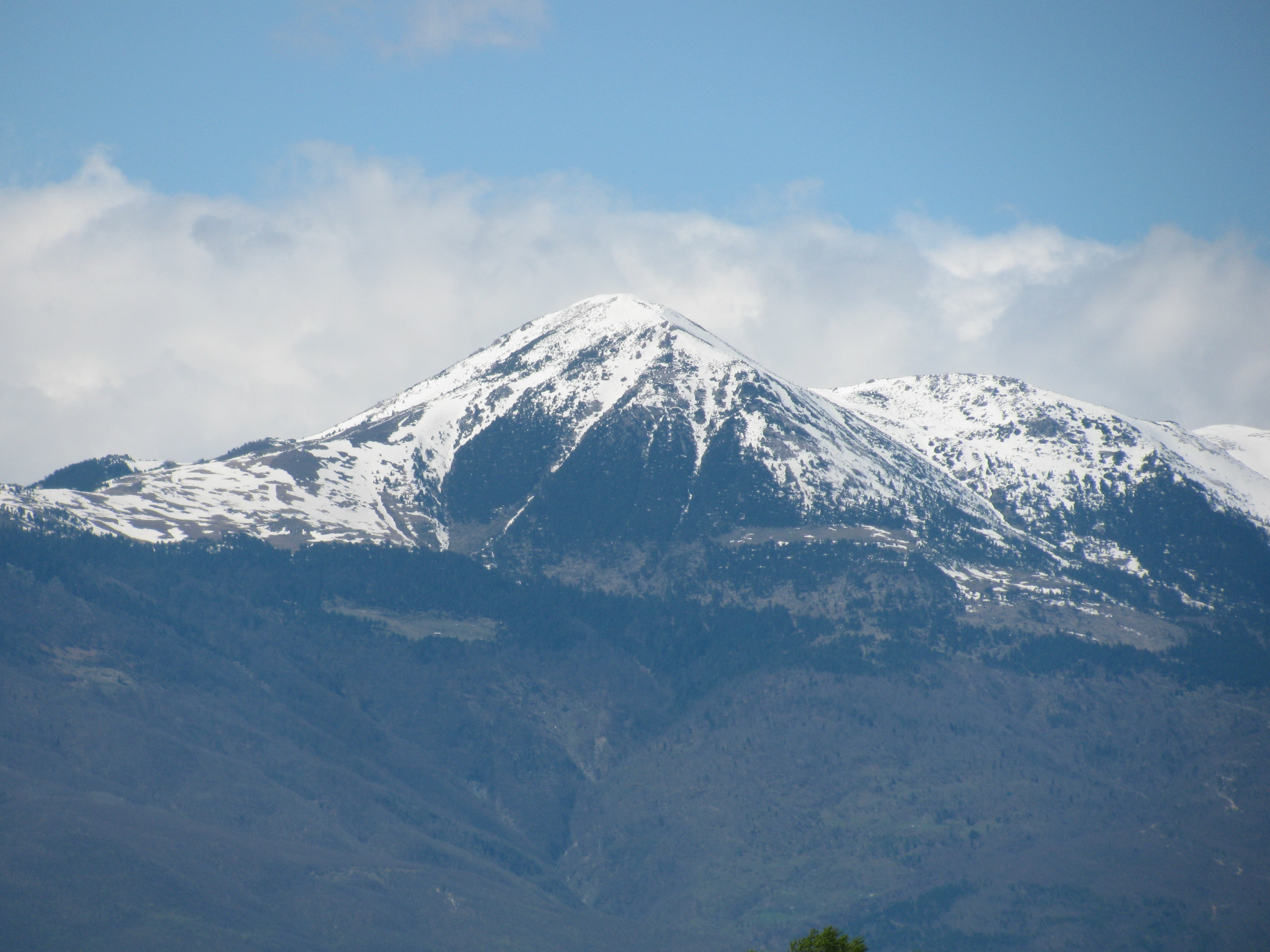
The Strellci Peak, standing at 2,377-metre-high (7,799 ft)

== Demographics ==
According to the 2024 national census by the Kosovo Agency of Statistics, the municipality of Deçan has 27,775 inhabitants.

The overwhelming majority of the inhabitants are Albanians (98.45%). Other ethnicities include Egyptians, Bosniaks and others.

Municipal historical population
Year	Pop.	±% p.a.
1948	17,840	—
1953	19,223	+1.50%
1961	25,552	+3.62%
1971	31,335	+2.06%
1981	35,577	+1.28%
1991	42,898	+1.89%
2011	40,019	−0.35%
2024	27,758	−2.77%

=== Religion ===
According to the 2011 census, 98.8% of the inhabitants were Muslim.

== Infrastructure ==
=== Roads ===
Deçan is connected to the neighboring municipality of Peja and Gjakova with the regional road R107, which connects Peja and Prizren.

=== Health ===
In the Municipality of Deçan, for the level of primary health care are the following units responsible:

- 1 Main Family Medicine Center (Albanian: Qendër Kryesore e Mjekësisë Familjare) in Deçan,
- 3 Family Medicine Centers (Albanian: Qendra të Mjekësisë Familjare) in Strellc i Epërm, Isniq and Irzniq,
- 4 Family Medicine Clinics (Albanian: Ambulanta të Mjekësisë Familjare) in Lumbardh, Prapaqan, Gramaçel, Pobergjë

== Culture ==
The medieval Serbian Orthodox Visoki Dečani monastery stands around 2 km (1.2 mi) to the west of the town.

== Twin towns – sister cities ==
Deçan is twinned with:

- Plav, Montenegro
- Ulcinj, Montenegro

== Notable people ==
- Jusuf Gervalla (1948-1982) Activist, writer & musician
- Azem Maksutaj (b.1975), kickboxer
- Binak Alia (1805–1895), Albanian revolt leader
- Daut Haradinaj (b. 1978), UÇK Commander and politician
- Luan Haradinaj (1973-1997), UÇK soldier, Hero of Kosovo
- Ramush Haradinaj (b. 1968), UÇK Commander and former prime minister
- Shkëlzen Haradinaj (1970-1999), UÇK Commander, Hero of Kosovo
- Valmir Berisha (b. 1996), footballer
- Musa Gjikokaj ex-footballer

== Bibliography ==
- Fine, John Van Antwerp (1994). The Late Medieval Balkans: A Critical Survey from the Late Twelfth Century to the Ottoman Conquest. University of Michigan Press. ISBN 978-0-472-08260-5.
- Novak, Viktor (1954). Историјски часопис 4 (1952-1953). Istorijski institut.
- Vickers, Miranda (1998). Between Serb and Albanian: A History of Kosovo. Columbia University Press. ISBN 0-631-19807-5.
