= List of massacres in Kosovo =

This is a list of massacres that happened in Kosovo throughout history.

== Ottoman period ==
Event	Date	Location	Deaths	Perpetrator	Victims	Description
1878 attacks	1878	Kosovo vilayet		Albanian refugees	Serbs	Incoming Albanian refugees to Kosovo who were expelled by the Serb army from the Sanjak of Niș were involved in revenge attacks and hostile actions to the local Serb population.
1898–1899 attacks	1898-1899	Old Serbia		Albanians	Serbs	
1901 massacres of Serbs	1901	Pristina and Ibarski Kolašin		Albanians	Serbs	
Takeover of Pristina	~23 October 1912	Pristina	5,000	Serbian army	Albanians	First Balkan War
Takeover of Ferizaj	24 October 1912	Ferizaj	1,200	Serbian army	Albanians	First Balkan War
Takeover of Prizren	1912	Prizren	5,000	Serbian and Montenegrin armies	Albanians	First Balkan War
Leshkobare massacre	1912	Lloshkobare	8	Serbian army	Albanians	First Balkan War
Torching of Bobaj	1912	Bobaj		Serbian army	Albanians	All inhabitants of Bobaj were killed.
Extermination of Opoja and Restelica	1912–1913	Opoja and Restelica	thousands	Serbian army	Albanians	Serbian troops were ordered to exterminate the population of the villages of Opoja, Gora, Bellobrad, Brrut, Rrenc, Bresanë, Zym and Qafëleshi.
Razing of Peja	1912–1913	Peja		Serbian army and Chetniks	Albanians	
Nashec massacre	March 1913	Village of Nashec, near Prizren	28	Serbian army	Albanians	28 Albanians were killed and massacred by the Serbian army.
Massacre of the Bytyçi tribe	1913	Highlands of Gjakova	51	Serbian army	Albanians	First Balkan War
Massacre of the Rugova tribe	1913	Rugova		Montenegrin army	Albanians	Every man of the Rugova tribe was reportedly killed.
Vucitrn killings	1913	Vushtrri		Serbian army	Albanians	

== World War I ==
Event	Date	Location	Deaths	Perpetrator	Victims	Description
Astrazubi massacre	1914	Malisheva	227	Serbian army	Albanians	90% of the houses in Astrazubi were destroyed.
Peja massacres	1914	Peja		Serbian army	Albanians	25 civilians were killed each day.
Lubishtë massacres	1914	Lubishtë	104	Serbian army	Albanians	
Julekar massacre	1914	Viti	24	Serbian army	Albanians	
Attack on Bytyçi	1915	Highlands of Gjakova		Serbian army	Albanians	The Ushki family almost completely killed, with only one survivor.
Bombardment of Vechali	1915	Prizren–Tetovo	65	Serbian army	Albanians	The Serbian army shelled the village of Vecali.

== Interwar period ==
Event	Date	Location	Deaths	Perpetrator	Victims	Description
Rugova massacre	16 February 1919	Rugova	842	Army of Kingdom of Yugoslavia	Albanian civilians	
Mitrovica killings	1919–1921	Mitrovica	1,330	Army of Kingdom of Yugoslavia	Albanian civilians	
Peja killings	1919–1921	Peja	1,563	Army of Kingdom of Yugoslavia	Albanian civilians	
Prizren killings	1919–1921	Prizren	4,600	Army of Kingdom of Yugoslavia	Albanian civilians	
Ferizaj killings	1919–1921	Ferizaj	1,694	Army of Kingdom of Yugoslavia	Albanian civilians	
Keqekolla massacre	January 1921	Keqekolla		Army of Kingdom of Yugoslavia	Albanian civilians	
Prapashtica massacre	January 1921	Prapashticë		Army of Kingdom of Yugoslavia	Albanian civilians	
Dushkaja massacre	1921	Dushkaja	63	Army of Kingdom of Yugoslavia	Albanian civilians	
Dubnica massacre	10 February 1924	Dubnica	25	Army of Kingdom of Yugoslavia	Albanian civilians	

== World War II ==
Event	Date	Location	Deaths	Perpetrator	Victims	Description
Massacres of Kosovo Serbs	April–May 1941	Districts of Peja, Gjakova, Istog and Drenica	162	Albanian fascists	Serbs	Massacres accompanied by expulsions and burning down of villages.
Istok killings	1941–1943	Istog	275	Albanian fascists	Serbs	
Goraždevac killings	1941	Goraždevac near Peja	47	Albanian fascists	Serbs	
Ibarski Kolašin massacres	30 September–10 October 1941	Ibarski Kolašin	150	Albanian fascists	Serbs	22 villages also burnt down.
Ibarski Kolašin killings	1942–1943	Ibarski Kolašin	130	Albanian fascists	Serbs	
June 1942 Pristina killings	Late June 1942	Pristina area	100	Albanian fascists	Serbs	
Vareška Reka massacre	June 1943		15	Albanian fascists	Serbs	
Trepča mine executions	3–7 June 1943	Trepça mines, Mitrovica	64	Albanian fascists	Serbs	Mass shooting of Serbs by Albanians, Albanian gendarmerie and prison guards at the Trepča mine prison, most of whom were workers that had fallen ill, and among whom several were peasants from the Mitrovica vicinity.
Uroševac massacre	11–12 September 1943	Ferizaj area	60	Albanian fascists	Serbs	48 were killed in the town itself, while 12 others were taken out of town and killed after being tortured. The unit responsible was commanded by Amdija Jašarević.
Nekodim, Baroš Selo, Duganjevo and Plešina murders	12–13 September 1943	Nekodim, Baroš Selo, Duganjevo and Plešina	Unknown	Albanian fascists	Serbs	
Žerovnica killings	10 October 1943	Žerovnica	6	Albanian fascists	Serbs	
Brestovik mass killing	13 October 1943	Brestovik	19	Albanian fascists	Serbs	19 Serbs in the Serb village of Brestovik near Peja were killed by Albanian quislings on 13 October 1943. Before the Italian capitulation (September 1943), 12 villagers had also been killed.
Rakoš massacre	October 1943	Rakoš	65	Albanian fascists	Serbs	Serbs shot by Albanians in Rakoš, a village half-way between Kosovska Mitrovica and Peć.
Peja massacres	Late 1943	Peja	230	Albanian fascists	Serbs	
Rakoš mass killings	3 December 1943	Rakoš	30	Albanian fascists	Serbs	
Siga massacre	4 December 1943	Siga	36	Albanian fascists	Serbs	36 Serbs from the village of Siga were massacred by the Kosovo Regiment
Peja mass killings	4–7 December 1943	Peja	300	Albanian fascists	Serbs	Between 4 and 7 December 1943, 400 soldiers of Kosovo Regiment commanded by Xhafer Deva surrounded Peć and committed mass murder of local Serbs and Montenegrins, killing at least 300 people.
Tople Vode massacre	1944	Kaçanik	13	Bulgarian forces	Serbs	13 Serbs from the village of Vrbeštica shot by Bulgarian forces.
Štrpce massacre	30 June 1944	Štrpce	50	Bulgarian military	Serbs	Serbs shot after the death of a Bulgarian soldier.

== Kosovo War ==
Event	Date	Location	Deaths	Perpetrator	Victims	Description
Attacks on Likoshane and Çirez	28 February–1 March 1998	Likoshan and Çirez, near Drenas	26	Serbian special police	KLA, Albanian civilians	Yugoslav authorities launched an assault on multiple houses in Likoshane and Çirez, killing 26 Albanian civilians after clashes occurred between the MUP and KLA.
Attack on Prekaz	5–7 March 1998	Prekaz, near Skenderaj	59	VJ, SAJ	KLA, Albanian civilians	operation led by the Special Anti-Terrorism Unit of Serbia which lasted from 5–7 March 1998, which goal was to eliminate Kosovo Liberation Army (KLA) suspects and their families. During the operation, KLA leader Adem Jashari and his brother Hamëz were killed, along with nearly 60 other family members.
Volujak Massacre	27 - 28 July 1998	Volujak	25	KLA	Serbian civilians	According to Serb authorities, 25 male Kosovo Serb civilians were executed. Serbia attributes the killings to the KLA "Orahovac group"
Klecka case	17–22 July 1998	Kleçka	8-10	KLA (suspected)	Serbian and Albanian prisoners	The MUP took control of the Klečka area in August 1998, finding eight to ten bodies burned in a lime kiln after being executed. The KLA is the suspected perpetrator.
Mališevo mass grave	17–20 July 1998	Malishevë	13	KLA	Serbian civilians	12 Serbs and 1 Bulgarian were kidnapped and then executed by the KLA in Mališevo between 17–20 July 1998
Orahovac Massacre	17–20 July 1998	Rahovac	47	KLA	Serbian civilians	More than 100 Serbian and Roma civilians from Orahovac and its surrounding villages – Retimlje, Opterusa, Zočište and Velika Hoca – in western Kosovo were kidnapped and placed in prison camps by KLA fighters; 47 were massacred
Lake Radonjić massacre	Before 9 September 1998	Glođane	34	KLA	Serbs, Albanians	On 9 September 1998 the Serbian police announced the finding of a mass grave. By 16 September 34 bodies were gathered. Victims included some Albanians.
Gornje Obrinje massacre	26 September 1998	Abri e Epërme	21	Serbian special police	Albanian civilians	Operation against KLA, in retaliation of at least 14 killed Serbian policemen, subsequent massacre with HRW claiming 21 civilians.
Golubovac executions	26 September 1998	Golubovac	13	Serbian paramilitary	KLA or Albanian civilians	Following Gornje Obrinje, summary execution of men suspected of being KLA.
Panda Bar massacre	14 December 1998	Peja	6	Unknown	Serbian civilians	6 Serb civilians killed and 14 wounded in attack on café in Peja. The KLA was accused at the time of the events, but strongly rejected any involvement. The Serbian Organised Crime Prosecutor's Office launched an investigation in 2016 and reached the conclusion that the massacre was not perpetrated by Albanians. Speculation that the crime may have been committed by the Serbian state security services had been put forward in the past, but the crime remained unsolved as no new evidence had come forward for a long time.
Račak massacre	15 January 1999	Reçak	54	SAJ, JSO	KLA, Albanian civilians	Operation against KLA (9 suspected KLA killed), including killings of 45 civilians. Controversial topic.
Mitrovica massacre	13 March 1999	Bazaar of Mitrovica	6	Serbian police	Albanian civilians	After three grenades were thrown at the market, six people died, over 128 others were injured, many of them remained disabled for life.
Velika Kruša massacre	25 March 1999	Krushë e Madhe	243	Serbian special police	Albanian civilians	243 Albanian civilians were killed by Yugoslav Special Police units in the Kruša region, after houses were systematically looted and burned.
Bela Crkva massacre	25 March 1999	Bela Crkva	62-77	Serbian special police and paramilitary	Albanian civilians	Paramilitary and police units entered Bela Crkva on 25 March 1999 and found groups of Albanian civilians taking refuge along the Bellaj river. The women were separated from the men and were expelled from the village. The men were later executed, 62-77 bodies were discovered.
Suva Reka massacre	26 March 1999	Suva Reka	48	Serbian police	Albanian civilians	Members of the Berisha family were forced into their family-owned pizzeria, where two hand grenades were thrown. Serbian police officers shot those who displayed signs of life. The bodies were disposed into a mass grave near a police facility in Batajnica, Serbia.
Imeraj massacre	26 March 1999	Pemishtë/Cërkolez	19	Serbian military police & paramilitaries	Albanian civilians	Serbian forces entered the village of Pemishtë/Cërkolez and killed 19 Albanian civilians, all members of the Imeraj family, including 13 women and children.
Izbica massacre	28 March 1999	Izbica	93-120	VJ, police and paramilitary	Albanians	Execution of Albanian civilians in Izbica following the shelling of nearby villages.
Podujevo massacre	28 March 1999	Podujevë	14	Serbian security forces, Scorpions	Albanian civilians	Security forces gunned down 19 people in the town of Podujevo, killing 14 people and injuring 5, whom were children
Pusto Selo massacre	31 March 1999	Pusto Selo near Rahovac	106	Serbian forces	KLA or Albanian civilians	106 civilians were killed by Yugoslav forces in Pusto Selo as a retaliatory attack after fighting earlier in the village. Residents stated that the KLA had a base in Drenoc, and the Yugoslav forces may have attacked Pusto Selo as an attempt to eliminate KLA forces in the region.
Rezalla massacre	5 April 1999	Rezalla	80 - 98	Serbian forces	Albanian civilians	Serbian police entered the Albanian village of Rezala and gunned down at least 80 to 98 villagers.
Ljubižda massacre	12 April 1999	Lubizhdë, Prizren	40	Serbian forces	Albanian civilians	Serbian security forces shot and killed 40 men in the village of Ljubižda Has, northwest of Prizren.
Gjakova bombing	14 April 1999	Gjakovë	73	NATO	Albanian refugees	NATO accidentally bomb Albanian refugees in Gjakova.
Slovinje massacre	15–16 April 1999	Sllovi near Lipjan	35–44	Serbian security forces	Albanians	Between 35 and 44 people were shot and executed by Serbian police and paramillitaries in Slovinje and the immediate villages surrounding it (notably Smolusa)
Poklek massacre	17 April 1999	Poklek, Drenas	53	Serbian police	Albanians	On April 17, 1999, Serbian forces killed 53 Albanian civilians in Poklek, near Drenas. Among the victims were 24 children, the youngest just 4 and 10 months old.
Staro Ćikatovo massacre	17 April 1999	Çikatovë e Vjetër	24 - 27	Serbian forces	Albanians	24 - 27 men of the Morina family were killed during a day-long raid by Serbian forces. Although survivors claimed that none of the killed were involved with the KLA, several members of the family are admitted KLA members.
Mala Kaludra massacre	19 April 1999	Kalludra e Vogël	23	Serbian paramilitaries	Albanian refugees	23 Albanian refugees were killed by Serbian paramilitaries as they fled towards Montenegro.
Meja massacre	27 April 1999	Mejë near Gjakova	377	Serbian forces	Albanian civilians	Serbian forces retaliate for the KLA killing of five Serbian policemen in Meja on 21 April, by mass killings on 27 April in that village. The number of victims is unknown, but is believed by HRW to be 300 (based on missing persons list), although very few bodies have been found. Newer figures raise the number dead to at least 377.
Lužane bus bombing	1 May 1999	Lluzhan	23–60	NATO	Serbian civilians	NATO missile attack on bridge.
Vushtrri massacre	2–3 May 1999	Vushtrri	120	Serbian forces	Albanian civilians	Albanian refugees fleeing the fighting that was occurring between the Yugoslav Army and the KLA were cornered by the Serb Special Forces (who suspected that some KLA members were fleeing the fighting with the refugees). The Special Forces picked out about 120 men who they suspected of being KLA deserters and sprayed them with bullets and later hid their bodies in a mass-grave near Gornja Sudimlja.
Koriša bombing	14 May 1999	Korishë, Prizren	87	NATO	Albanian refugees	NATO bombed a column of Albanian refugees, killing at least 87 and wounding 60.
Ćuška massacre	14 May 1999	Qyshk	41	Serbian security forces	Albanians	An estimated twelve men killed in round-up, 29 men gathered into three houses and gunned down. Unclear motive.
Bilbildere massacre	16 May 1999	Prizren	2	Serbian paramillitaries	Albanians	2 men were captured by Arkan's Tigers and were summarily executed.
Dubrava Prison massacre	22–23 May 1999	Dubrava	79–82	NATO Serbian prison guards	Albanian inmates	Inmates were extrajudicially killed or summary executed on 22 and 23 May following NATO bombings on 19 May.
Tusus massacre	26 May 1999	Prizren	27–34	Serbian forces	Albanians	Serbian forces kill 27–34 people and burn over 100 homes. Retaliation for at least two killed policemen on crossing street that morning by KLA.

== Aftermath of Kosovo War ==
Event	Date	Location	Deaths	Perpetrator	Victims	Description
Peja killing	12 June 1999	Peja	7	Serbian forces	Albanian civilians	Six members of a family were killed and one was captured and found dead.
Silvovo killings	22 June 1999	Silvovo	4	KLA (suspected)	Serbian civlians	Four Serbian brothers, Zivojin, Zivko, Trogan, and Dimitrice Simic were found stabbed to death in Silvovo next to the village of Gračinca. Many suspected that KLA was behind this but the perpetrators remained unknown.
Gnjilane massacre	June–October 1999	Gjilan	51	KLA	Serbian civilians	KLA's Gnjilane Group burned homes and murdered Serbs and other non-Albanian civilians. The remains of 51 Serbs were discovered in mass graves in 1999.
Staro Gracko massacre	23 July 1999	Lipjan	14	KLA	Serbian civilians	Mass killing of 14 Serb farmers in the village of Staro Gracko in the municipality of Lipljan on 23 July 1999. The killings occurred after Yugoslav troops withdrew from the region in the aftermath of the Kosovo War.
Ugljare massacre	Before August 1999	Ugljare	15	KLA	Serbs	KFOR reports on 25 August 1999 the finding of 15 bodies of killed Serbs. Killed months prior, the bodies were concealed by the KFOR.
Klokot killings	16 August 1999	Klokot	2	Albanian extremists	Serbian civilians	On 16 August 1999, after the Kosovo War, a mortar attack carried out by Albanians killed two Serb civilians and wounded five others in the village. There had earlier that month been two mortar attacks.
Mitrovica massacre	3–4 February 2000	North Mitrovica	10	Serbian extremists	Albanian civilians	Serbian extremists stormed the houses of 10 Albanian civilians and murdered them on the nights of 3–4 February 2000.
Cernica Killings	28 May 2000	Cernica	3	Albanian extremists	Serbian civilians	Three Serbs including a four year old child were murdered in cold blood during a drive-by shooting in Cernica, a village south of Gnjilane.
Podujevo bus bombing	16 February 2001	Podujevë	12	Albanian extremists	Serbian civilians	12 dead and 40 wounded in bombing attack on bus convoy carrying Serbs traveling to Serb enclave Gračanica to visit family graves.
Hajra family massacre	21 August 2001	Drenas	5	Former members of KLA	Albanian civilians	5 Former members of the Kosovo Liberation Army in the late evening killed five members of the Albanian Hajra family
Stolic Family Massacre	3 June 2003	Obiliq	3		Serbian civilians	Three Serbs were axed to death. The house was then set on fire.
Goraždevac murders	13 August 2003	Goraždevac	2	Albanian extremists	Serbian civilians	Shots fired from Albanian village on the Serb enclave kills two, an adult and a child, and wounding four.
2004 unrest in Kosovo	17–18 March 2004	Kosovo	8	Albanians	Serbian civilians	On 17 and 18 March 2004, a wave of violent riots swept through Kosovo, 8 Serbs and 11 Albanians were killed during the unrest. Over 935 Serbian houses and 35 Churches were burned and destroyed. Over 4000 Serbs were expelled from Kosovo.
Talinoc Killings	6 July 2012	Talinoc i Muhaxhirëve	2		Serbian civilians	A married Serb couple, war refugees who had returned to the village, were murdered in their house on 6 July 2012. After the murders, the village Serbs asked the government to secure their relocation to either Strpce or Gracanica, or else they were to leave for Central Serbia.

== See also ==
- Serbian–Ottoman Wars (1876–1878)
- Balkan Wars (First Balkan War • Second Balkan War)
- World War I
- Interwar period
- World War II
- Kosovo War
- North Kosovo crisis (2011–2013)

== Sources ==
- Abrahams, Fred; Andersen, Elizabeth (1998). Humanitarian Law Violations in Kosovo. Human Rights Watch. pp. 30–32. ISBN 978-1-56432-194-7.
- Antonijević, Nenad (2009). Mirković, Jovan (ed.). Албански злочини над Србима на Косову и Метохији у Другом светском рату, документа, друго измењено и допуњено издање (PDF). Belgrade: Музеј жртава геноцида.
- Filipović, Gordana (1989). Kosovo—past and present. Review of International Affairs.
- Judah, Tim (2002) [2000]. Kosovo: War and Revenge. Yale University Press. ISBN 978-0-300-09725-2.
- Krieger, Heike (2001). The Kosovo Conflict and International Law: An Analytical Documentation 1974-1999. Cambridge University Press. p. 96. ISBN 0-521-80071-4.
- Lekić, Đorđe (1995). Kosovo i metohija tokom vekova: zublja. NILP "Panorama".
- HRW (2001). Under Orders: War Crimes in Kosovo. Human Rights Watch. ISBN 978-1-56432-264-7.
- Mikić, Đorđe (1988). Društvene i ekonomske prilike kosovskih srba u XIX i početkom XX veka. SANU. ISBN 9788670250772.
- Yugoslav Survey. Vol. 40. Jugoslavija Publishing House. 1999.
