= Terrorism in Serbia =

This article includes information on actions described as terrorist acts in the Federal Republic of Yugoslavia (FRY, 1992–2003), Serbia and Montenegro (2003–2006) and Serbia (2006-).

== Federal Republic of Yugoslavia ==
=== 1995-1998 Kosovo insurgency ===
Emblem of the Kosovo Liberation Army

In 1992–1993, ethnic Albanians created the Kosovo Liberation Army (KLA). In 1995, the Dayton Agreement was signed in Dayton, Ohio. Finalized on 21 November 1995 and signed on 10 December 1995, the agreement ended the three-year-long Bosnian War. After the Bosnian War, the KLA began staging ambushes of Serb patrols as well as killing policemen, as they sought to capitalize on popular resentment among Kosovan Albanians against the Serbian regime.

From 1996 onwards, the KLA took responsibility for the attacks it committed. The KLA grew to a few hundred Albanians who attacked police stations and wounded many police officers from 1996 to 1997. Following the 1997 Albanian civil unrest, the KLA was enabled to acquire large amounts of weapons looted from Albanian armories. The KLA also received large funds from Albanian diaspora organizations.

Starting in 1998, attacks from the KLA against Serbian police and security forces significantly increased, as well as the KLA attempting to "cleanse" Kosovo of its ethnic Serbian population. The KLA was now involved in frontal battle, with increasing numbers of Yugoslav security forces. Escalating tensions led to the Kosovo War in February 1998.

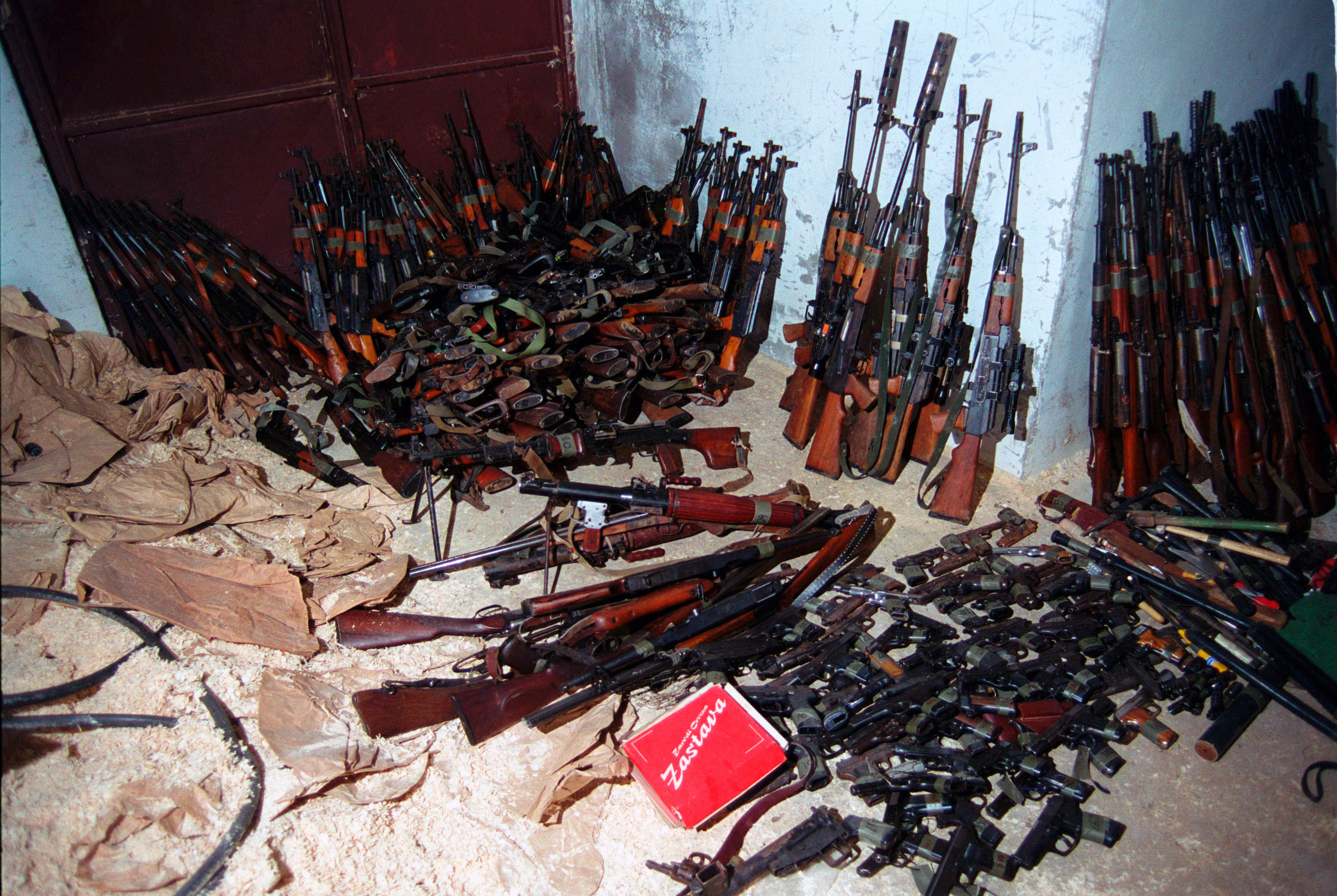
Weapons confiscated from the KLA in July 1999

The increased attacks on Serbian security forces led the Serbian government to declare the KLA as a terrorist organization. On the other hand, most ethnic Albanians considered the KLA as "freedom fighters". The United States had also reportedly added the KLA to its list of international terrorist organizations. However, strained relations between the U.S. and the Federal Republic of Yugoslavia led the Clinton administration to remove the organization from the terrorist list in late 1998. In February 1998, Robert Gelbard, U.S. President Bill Clinton's special envoy to the Balkans, described the KLA as "without any questions, a terrorist group" and added that "we condemn very strongly terrorist activities in Kosovo." In March 1998, just one month later Gerbald had to modify his statements to say that KLA had not been classified legally by the U.S. government as a terrorist group.

=== Kosovo War ===
On 28 February 1998, the KLA ambushed a unit of the Serbian police near Likoshan, killing four and seriously wounding two other policemen. Serbian police responded by launching an operation in Likoshan and Qirez, leading to the killing of 4 KLA members and 26 Kosovo Albanian civilians in both villages. An operation led by the Special Anti-Terrorist Unit (SAJ) from 5 to 7 March 1998 resulted in KLA leader Adem Jashari and his brother Hamëz were killed, along with nearly 60 other family members. These attacks resulted in the beginning of the Kosovo War.

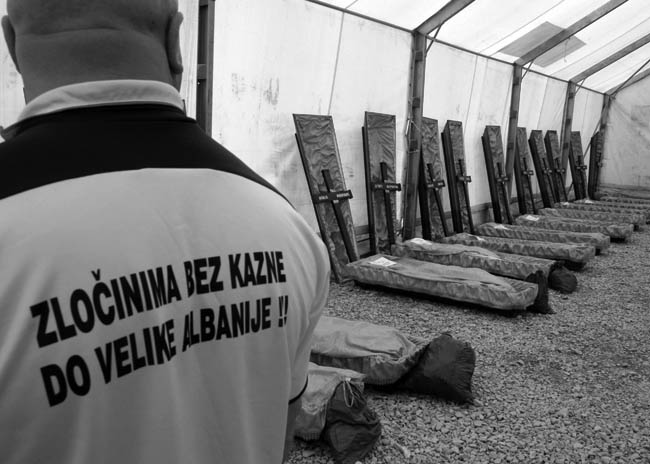
Victims of massacres carried out by the KLA

There have been reports of war crimes committed by the KLA during the conflict. These have been directed against Serbs, other ethnic minorities (primarily the Roma) and against ethnic Albanians accused of collaborating with Serb authorities. The KLA ran prison camps including the Lapušnik prison camp the Jablanica prison camp.

On 10 June 1999, the Kumanovo Agreement was signed between British Army general Mike Jackson and Yugoslav Army general Nebojša Pavković. The agreement not only ended the Kosovo War, but also established a 5-kilometre-wide "Ground Safety Zone" (GSZ) around Kosovo (governed by the UN) and into the FRY if necessary.

=== Preševo Valley insurgency ===
In June 1999, a new Albanian militant insurgent group was formed by Shefket Musliu, called the Liberation Army of Preševo, Medveđa and Bujanovac (UÇPMB), began training in the GSZ, which was witnessed by KFOR. The group began attacking Serbian civilians and police, with the goal of joining Preševo, Medveđa and Bujanovac into Kosovo, which escalated into an insurgency. The European Union (EU) condemned what it described as the "extremism" and use of "illegal terrorist actions" by the group. The UÇPMB only attacked Serbs from a distance with mortars, so the Serbs couldn't respond, as well as including minors.

On 16 February 2001, a Niš-Ekspres bus carrying 57 passengers was hit by a remote-controlled bomb that exploded in its vicinity. The Serbs were travelling to visit family graves in Gračanica on the Orthodox Christian Day of the Dead. The bombing killed twelve Serb civilians and injured dozens more. Albanian extremists, mainly the UÇPMB, were suspected of being responsible for the attack.

As part of an agreement by NATO, the Yugoslav Army were allowed to enter the GSZ via Operation Return. On 21 May 2001, UÇPMB commanders Shefket Musliu, Muhamet Xhemajli, Ridvan Qazimi and Mustafa Shaqiri signed the Končulj Agreement which resulted in the full demilitarization, demobilization, and disarmament of the UÇPMB.

=== Preševo Valley Crisis ===
Albanian paramilitary organization Albanian National Army (ANA, AKSh) also had former UÇPMB fighters. After the National Liberation Army disbanded, the ANA later went and operated in the Preševo Valley. Many former UÇPMB members also joined the Liberation Army of Eastern Kosovo (LAEK), but because of its lack of members, LAEK is not active.

In 2002, reports of low-intensity skirmishes and illegal logging incidents arose after casualties were reported by Serbian officials. In the same year, different armed groups, along with former members of the UÇPMB and members of the ANA, started frequently attacking Serbian police and Gendarmery.

On 25 January 2014, a Norwegian citizen attacked Gendarmery in Preševo. He was killed in a crossfire with the police. His motive was suspected to be an act of Islamic terrorism.

== Serbia ==
2024 attack on the Israeli embassy in Belgrade
