= Six Oaks of Likoshan =

Grove of trees in Kosovo

- Lisat Gjashtnjakë
- IUCN category III (natural monument or feature)
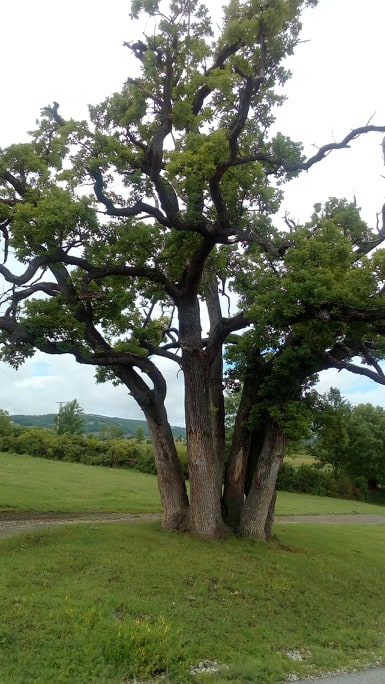
- Location: Likoshan, Drenas, Drenica, Kosovo
- Area: 0.5 ha (1.2 acres)
- Established: 2006

The Six Oaks of Likoshan are a grove of Quercus pubescens (pubescent oak) trees in the village of Likoshan in the Drenas municipality, in the Drenica region of Kosovo. The very old trees are among Kosovo's few natural monuments. The locals call it Te Lisat Gjashtënjakë ("the Six Crowded Oaks") since they emerge from one root. In 2006, the organism was labeled a botanic monument under the official categorization MN/031. Besides its natural value, it has historical significance, since the Kosovo Liberation Army fought its first battle on 28 February 1998 by its trunk.
