= Gadime e Ulët =

Gadime e Ulët: Gadime e Ulët (Albanian); Доње Гадимље/Donje Gadimlje (Serbian)
- Village
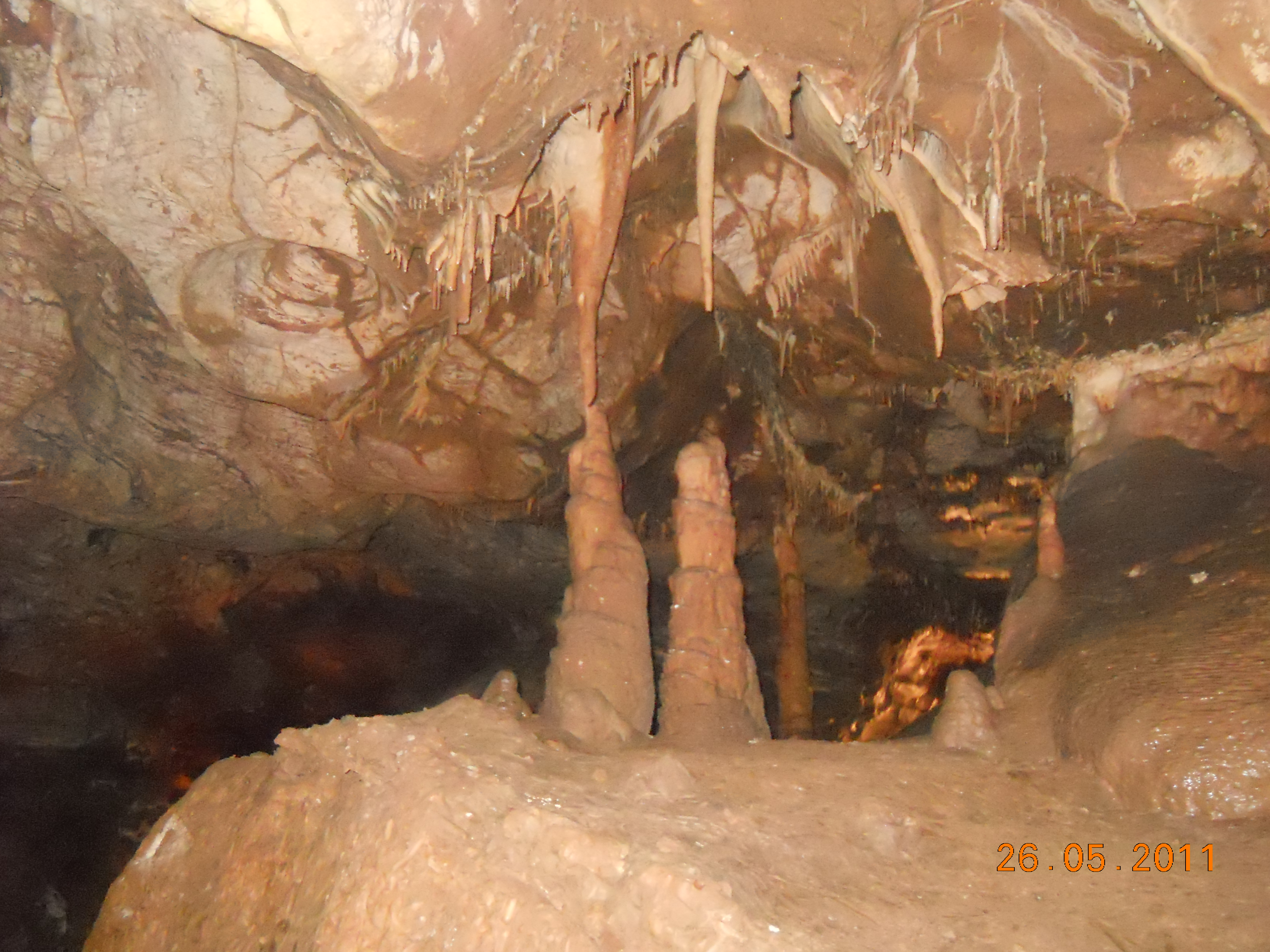
- Gadime Village
- Interactive map of Gadime e Ulët
- Coordinates: 42.476741°N 21.205518°E
- Country: Kosovo
- District: Prishtinë
- Municipality: Lipjan

Population (2024)
  - Total: 2,882
- Time zone: UTC+1 (CET)
  - Summer (DST): UTC+2 (CEST)

Gadime e Ulët (Albanian: Gadime e Ulët, Serbian Cyrillic: Доње Гадимље/Donje Gadimlje) is a village in Lipjan municipality. Gadime e Ulët is located approximately 20 kilometers south of Prishtina and around seven kilometers southeast of Lipjan in the southern area of the Kosovo Polje. It is nestled against hills that border the eastern plain. A narrow passage between two hills leads eastward to the other side of the village, Gadime e Epërme.

== Gadime during the Kosovo War ==
During the early days of NATO airstrikes, Gadime e Ulët endured shelling from Babus. A resident, interviewed by Human Rights Watch, recounted the influx of people from Crnilo (Cernille), a village near Muhadzer Babus, arriving "five or six days after NATO started bombing." The constant threat persisted as Serbian forces, with tanks, entered Donje Gadimlje around noon on April 1. The villagers sought shelter and fled to a nearby river, but returned later the same day. However, they fled again at 5:00 p.m. when the Serbian army arrived with five tanks, reportedly firing into the air.

== Cultural Heritage and Genetics ==
The village of Gadime is home to a closely-knit community whose members all belong to the esteemed Albanian tribe known as Krasniqi. This tribe holds a significant place in the region's cultural fabric, with its roots tracing back through generations. The individuals comprising the Krasniq tribe bear the distinctive genetic marker known as haplogroup J2b-L283. This genetic lineage serves as a notable identifier and connects the members of the Krasniq tribe through their ancestry. Tracing the presence of haplogroup J2b-L283 within the Krasniq tribe provides valuable insights into their genetic heritage and ancestral connections.
