= Faton Domi =

Yugoslav footballer (died 1987)

Personal information
- Date of birth: 4 July
- Date of death: 22 November 1987
- Place of death: Volujak, Yugoslavia
- Position: Midfielder

Youth career
- KF Vëllaznimi

Senior career*
Years	Team	Apps	(Gls)
1977–1987	Prishtina		
1987	KF Vëllaznimi		
- * Club domestic league appearances and goals

Faton Domi (died 22 November 1987) was a Yugoslav footballer who played as a midfielder. He was considered part of the golden generation of FC Prishtina, when they played in the Yugoslav First League.

In 2022, the IFFHS included Domi in their all-time Kosovo men's dream team.

== Death and legacy ==
Domi, along with former teammate Fevzi Rama, were killed in a traffic accident in Volujak on the evening of 22 November 1987.

In 2020, there was a proposal to rename the Gjakova City Stadium after Domi, following the completion of renovations to the stadium.
