= PTJ =

PTJ may refer to:

- Cuerpo Técnico de Policía Judicial, Venezuela's national police agency until 2001
- Impetigore, also known as Perempuan Tanah Jahanam, a 2019 Indonesian folk horror film
- Passenger Train Journal, an American magazine about passenger railways and urban rail transit
- Paul Tudor Jones (born 1954), American hedge fund manager
- Phallon Tullis-Joyce (born 1996), American soccer player
- Portland Airport (Victoria), IATA code
- Protivteroristička jedinica, the Serbian name of the Counter-Terrorist Unit (Serbia)
