= Counterterrorism Center (disambiguation) =

The Counterterrorism Center or Counterterrorism Mission Center is a part of the U.S. Central Intelligence Agency

Counterterrorism Center or Counter Terrorism Centre may also refer to:

Australia

- Australian Counter-Terrorism Centre

Hungary

- Counter Terrorism Centre, a law enforcement agency

India

- National Counter Terrorism Centre, a proposed government agency

South Korea

- National Counter Terrorism Center

United States

- National Counterterrorism Center, a government agency

== See also ==
- Counter Terrorist Unit
