= Podujevo massacre =

1999 war crime in Yugoslavia

- Location: Podujevo, AP Kosovo, FR Yugoslavia (modern Kosovo)
- Date: 28 March 1999 (Central European Time)
- Target: Kosovo Albanians
- Attack type: Massacre
- Deaths: 14 civilians, all women or children
- Injuries: 5 children
- Perpetrators: Special Anti-Terrorist Unit; Scorpions

The Podujevo massacre (Albanian: Masakra e Podujevës; Serbian: Masakr u Podujevu) is the name generally used to refer to the killing of 14 Kosovo Albanian civilians, mostly women and children, committed in March 1999 by the Scorpions, a Serbian paramilitary organisation in conjunction with the Special Anti-Terrorist Unit of Serbia, during the Kosovo War. One of the survivors of this massacre, Saranda Bogujevci, 13 years old when it occurred, received mass media attention after she successfully managed to bring to justice her case with the help of several organizations from Serbia, Canada, and the United Kingdom.

== Massacre ==
According to Goran Stoparić, a policeman belonging to the Scorpions, the Scorpions were sent to the town of Podujevo on 28 March 1999 to take over land controlled by the Kosovo Liberation Army. Their unit commander had told them to find lodging in local houses. The unit had orders to kill all the ethnic Albanians living in the town.

Saranda Bogujevi, a survivor of the massacre, said that when a police vehicle parked outside of her family's house, they ran into a neighbour's backyard. The police searched their house, and ordered them to 'come out with their hands in the air' after they were discovered. They searched the family and took them out to the street, where many soldiers in different uniforms were waiting, and someone suddenly started firing their gun. The soldiers took the group behind the house and began shooting indiscriminately. Out of the group of 19, 14 people were killed – seven women and seven children aged between two and fifteen – and five children survived. Bogujevi, who was 13 at the time of the massacre, was shot in her torso, legs, and arms. Her arm was hit 13 times, and she now has limited movement in that arm. Her mother, two brothers, and some other relatives of hers all died in the massacre. She said that she saw a soldier force her aunt on to the ground and he shot her.

Stoparić said that Saša Cvjetan, another member of the Scorpions, lead a group of women and children into the backyard of a house, and he heard 'four to five bursts of automatic gunfire'. Stoparić overheard another soldier, known only as 'Vuk', telling a colleague that everyone in the group of civilians was killed.

=== Victims ===
Those killed in the massacre: Shpetim Bogujevci (aged 10), Shpend Bogujevci (aged 13), Sala Bogujevci (aged 39), Nora Bogujevci (aged 15), Shefkate Bogujevci (aged 43), Shehide Bogujevci (aged 67), Nefise Bogujevci Llugaliu (aged 54), Fezdrije Llugialiu (aged 21), Dafina Durići (aged 9), Arbër Durići (aged 7), Mimoza Durići (aged 4), Albin Durići (aged 2), Fitnete Durići (aged 36), and Isma Durići (aged 69).

Those injured in the massacre: Saranda Bogujevci (aged 14), Fatos Bogujevci (aged 13), Jehona Bogujevci (aged 11), Lirie Bogujevci (aged 9), and Genc (aged 6).

== Aftermath ==
Goran Stoparić, at the time of the events serving in the Anti-Terrorism Unit (SAJ), gave evidence to bring the culprits to justice. In an interview to Canadian Broadcasting Corporation, he speculated over the motives behind the actions committed by the irregular forces:

'In my opinion, [their] only motive was the fact that the victims were Albanians, and perhaps because of some hidden immaturity or sickness of mind on their part. They would probably have killed them had they been Bosnians or Croats. But it is certain that they were killed because they were not Serbs.'

Serbian police arrested two members of a paramilitary unit called the Scorpions, Saša Cvjetan and Dejan Demirović, who freely gave incriminating statements and signed them. Demirović had moved to Canada and applied for political asylum but was deported back to his home country after a campaign orchestrated by human rights organizations. Cvjetan was sentenced in Serbia to 20 years in prison. Cvjetan was released from prison early in late April 2018.

Another member of the Scorpions unit, Miodrag Solaja, was sentenced to 15 years in prison by Serbia in 2008 for his role in the massacre. He was released after serving 12 years, which drew criticism from the Kosovar government. Jahja Lluka, an advisor to Kosovar Prime Minister Ramush Haradinaj, said that Kosovo is 'outraged' by the release of Solaja. He also questioned the wisdom of sentencing a man who murdered 14 people to only 15 years in prison. The Deputy Prime Minister of Kosovo, Enver Hoxhaj, said that 'Serbia continues to make fun of the victims of the war' and that '[t]he release of the Serbian criminal is evidence that Serbia continues to play with everyone's nerves in all areas, even the military one!'

On 10 April 2007, four members of the Scorpions paramilitary group were convicted and sentenced to lengthy prison sentences by Belgrade's War Crimes Court for their roles in the Srebrenica massacre. Slobodan Medić, the man who ordered the massacre, was sentenced to 20 years in prison. His cousin Branislav Medić was also sentenced to 20 years in prison. Pera Petrasović, the only one of them who pleaded guilty, was sentenced to 13 years in prison. Aleksandar Medić, their driver, was sentenced to five years in prison. A fifth man, Aleksandar Vukov, was acquitted after the court determined that he left the scene before the massacre had occurred.

Saranda Bogujevci was elected vice-president of the Kosovan Parliament in 2021.

Prime Minister Albin Kurti attended a memorial event to the victims of the massacre on 28 March 2024, the 25th anniversary of the massacre.

== See also ==
- List of massacres in Yugoslavia
- List of massacres in the Kosovo War
- War crimes in Kosovo
- Battle of Podujevo
- Srebrenica massacre
