= Special Anti-terrorist Unit =

Special Anti-terrorist Unit may refer to:

- Special Anti-Terrorist Unit (Greece), Greek counter-terrorism unit of the Hellenic Police
- Special Anti-Terrorist Unit (Serbia), special operations and police unit in Serbia
- Special Anti-Terrorist Unit (Republika Srpska)

== See also ==
- Counter-Terrorist Unit (disambiguation)
