= Bela Crkva massacre =

1999 Kosovo War Yugoslav army killings

Coordinates: 42°21′N 20°35′E

- Part of Kosovo War
- Native name: Masakra e Bellacërkës
- Location: Bela Crkva, FR Yugoslavia (modern Kosovo)
- Date: March 25, 1999
- Target: Kosovo Albanians
- Deaths: 62-77
- Perpetrator: Yugoslav army

The Bela Crkva massacre (Albanian: Masakra e Bellacërkës) was the mass-killing of Kosovo Albanian villagers from Bellacërkë, Kosovo by Yugoslav armed forces on 24–25 March 1999.

Twelve hours after NATO had started bombing strategic Yugoslav targets, Yugoslav armed forces came to the area around Bela Crkva, fired artillery, and set fire to the village.

Villagers fled to the river bank and some hid under a bridge. Yugoslav forces found the villagers and divided them into two groups; men and women. ("Men" includes boys aged twelve and above). The men were stripped; their money, valuables, and documents taken; then they were executed. A smaller number of women were killed too. The youngest was four years old.

I was lucky. I was in front of the group. I was shot in the shoulder and flew into the stream, where I pretended to be dead. About 20 dead bodies fell on top of me. They then shot into the pile of bodies to be sure they were dead. They shot people one by one, but I didn't get shot because they didn't see me.

62 villagers were killed in the massacre. The British Foreign Secretary at the time, Robin Cook, said, "these children cannot conceivably have been a danger to anyone, but the Serb forces clearly saw every Albanian of whatever age as an enemy." Sixty of the victims were buried in a funeral on 5 July 1999, along with four others who were killed elsewhere.

After the war, the United States Department of State reported that 77 bodies were found near Bela Crkva according to ICTY information, which was confirmed following a site investigation conducted on 10 November 1999. Prior to the entry of the Kosovo Force into Kosovo, various sources indicated that 35 people were killed by Serb forces, with their bodies being dumped near the Bellaja river.

Human Rights Watch suggests that there were similar mass killings in other villages in the district, including Mala Kruša, Celina, and Piranë. However, eyewitnesses are rare, partly due to the efficient and systematic nature of the killings.

== See also ==
- War crimes in the Kosovo War
- List of massacres in the Kosovo War
