= Counter-Terrorist Unit =

Counter-Terrorist Unit may refer to:

- Counter-Terrorist Unit (Serbia), a tactical unit of the Serbian Police
- Counter Terrorist Unit, the setting of American TV series 24

== See also ==
- Special Anti-terrorist Unit (disambiguation)
- Counter Terrorism Response Unit, a tactical unit of the Hong Kong Police Force
- Counter Terrorism Command, a branch of the Metropolitan Police and City of London Police
- Counter-intelligence and counter-terrorism organizations
