= Gadime e Epërme =

Gadime e Epërme: Gadime e Epërme (Albanian); Горње Гадимље/Gornje Gadimlje (Serbian)
- Village
- Location within Kosovo
- Coordinates: 42.490030°N 21.225886°E
- Location: Kosovo
- District: Prishtinë
- Municipality: Lipjan

Population (2024)
  - Total: 2,167
- Time zone: UTC+1 (CET)
  - Summer (DST): UTC+2 (CEST)

Gadime e Epërme (Albanian: Gadime e Epërme, is a village in Lipjan, Pristina District, Kosovo.

Duirng the Ottoman period, Gadime E Epërme was referred to as Gadimja Gorna by Ottoman tax registers in the Kosovo Vilayet with the village consisting of a population of 25 households and 4 unmarried men.

In the Kosovo War the village was targeted by Yugoslav soldiers and so as its village below, Gadime e Ulët and came with heavy displacement.
