= Rezalla massacre =

1999 mass killing in Rezallë, Kosovo

- Part of the Kosovo War
- Native name: Masakra e Rezallës
- Location: 42.689°N 20.769°E; Rezallë, Srbica, AP Kosovo, FR Yugoslavia (modern Kosovo)
- Date: 5 April 1999; 27 years ago after 17:00 (Central European Time)
- Target: Kosovo Albanians
- Attack type: Mass killing
- Deaths: 98
- Injuries: 4; 2 later died due to the wounds
- Perpetrator: Serbian police forces
- Convicted: none

The Rezalla massacre (Albanian: Masakra e Rezallës) was the mass killing of 98 ethnic Albanians civilians in the village of Rezallë, on 5 April 1999 during the Kosovo War. The massacre was perpetrated by Serbian forces.

== Massacre ==
Early in the morning of 5 April, Serbian police forces surrounded the village of Rezallë while they were shooting from multiple directions. After entering the village, they went house to house and ordered the Albanian residents to come outside their houses. And, their houses were then set on fire.

After that, survivors recalled that Serbian Police instructed the villages to walk toward a hill, saying to them, “you can go to Thaçi or Clinton.” They took us into the yard of a house and they were kept there from approximately 11:00 a.m. until 5:00 p.m. During this time, the police separated men from age fourteen to fifty and beat them while their hands were tied behind their backs.

The execution of the massacre appears have been planned in advance, as indicated by the testimonies:

When they took us in the yard they started to check us. They told us to take everything we had out of our pockets.We were all kinds of people—old men, blind men, young men.There was a thirteen-year-old boy and they shot him [with everyone else]. When we were surrounded they were asking us [questions].We heard when they said ‘is it enough so we can kill them now?’

— A sixty-year-old survivor of the massacre, one of the two survivors, from the report Under Orders: War crimes in Kosovo

At around 5:00 p.m., the men were ordered to line up in pairs. Around that time, another group of Serbian police had arrived from the nearby village of Morinë, east of Rezallë. The police had then separated the women and children from the men and sent them toward the south, toward the village of Likoc. Witnesses stated that approximately thirty police officers were present at the site. Afterwards, the men were taken toward the road that leads to Likoc, where three to four additional civilians were brought from the nearby houses. A survivor describes then the following:

After [the police] brought these men they started to prepare their guns. One of them went to the roof of the house of [H.D.]. There were about thirty police there with us. The one who was on the roof was the first one to shoot. Then the others started to shoot. I was wounded with three bullets. They were shooting for half an hour. Then after that another one came closer and started to shoot with an automatic. When he came close to me he didn’t have any bullets. When he came back from reloading he went somewhere else and fortunately didn’t shoot me. Then they took the trucks and tractors and started to drive away. I stayed there for two hours because I was afraid to move

— A sixteen-year-old survivor of the massacre, the only other survivor, from the report Under Orders: War crimes in Kosovo

=== Survivors ===
One survivor stated that he was struck by three bullets but survived by remaining motionless among the dead. Another survivor, also survived by pretending to be dead after being wounded. Initially, four men survived the shooting. However, two of the survivors later died, one reportedly succumbed to his taken wounds 4 days after the massacre, while another was captured and killed 10 days later. Consequently, the only survivors were a sixty-year-old and a sixteen-year-old.

== Aftermath ==
There were efforts by the Serbian police to hide the victims’ bodies. Information from members of the Kosovo Liberation Army (KLA) suggested that in late May 1999 the bodies buried in shallow graves near the site were exhumed using bulldozers. According to these testimonies, the human remains were removed and the graves were subsequently filled with the carcasses of dead cows. Journalists who visited the site in June reported that the upper layers of the graves contained animal remains. Investigators from the International Criminal Tribunal for the former Yugoslavia (ICTY) did not recover human remains at the site. For a long time, the location of the victims’ bodies remained unknown.

Investigations in later years, with the help of satellite imagery under very difficult conditions, revealed that many of the victims’ bodies had been transported to mass graves in Serbia in an apparent attempt to conceal the killings. In 2021, 7 human remains belonging to the victims of this massacre were discovered at the Kizevak quarry, part of the Suva Ruda mine, near Raška in Serbia. On 30 September, these 7 remains exhumed from the site were handed over at the Merdarë crossing point and repatriated to Kosovo. Prior to the discovery of the remains, some families of the victims had maintained their family members' empty graves while waiting for the remains of their relatives to be located and identified.

== See also ==
- Drenica massacres
- List of massacres in Kosovo
