= Krusha massacres =

1999 massacres in the Kosovo War

Coordinates: 42°19′N 20°38′E

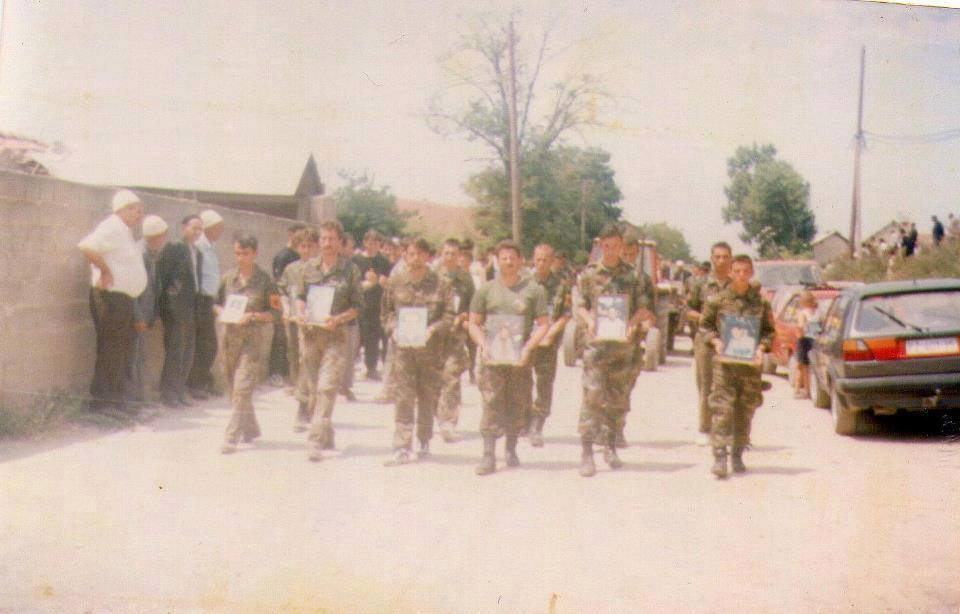
- Members of the KLA are holding pictures in memory of the men who were killed or went missing during the Kosovo War.
- Location: Kruša villages, near Orahovac, FR Yugoslavia (modern Kosovo)
- Date: 25–28 March 1999
- Target: Kosovo Albanian men and children
- Attack type: Mass killing
- Deaths: 243 men killed or missing
- Perpetrator: Special Police Units
- Motive: Anti-Albanian sentiment, ethnic cleansing

The Krusha massacres (Albanian: Masakra e Krushës së Madhe dhe Krushës së Vogël, Serbian: Масакр у Великој и Малој Круши, romanized: Masakr u Velikoj i Maloj Kruši) were two massacres that took place during the Kosovo War on the afternoon of 25 March 1999, the day after the NATO bombing of Yugoslavia began, near Orahovac, Kosovo.

At that time, witnesses reported that on 25 March special police unit entered the village of Velika Kruša and separated the men and boys, and killed around 100 men and male teenagers over the age of 13. Human Rights Watch reported that more than 98 men were killed. Then, the women and children were forced out. A similar approach was followed simultaneously in the neighboring Krushë e Vogël village, leading to a total of 243 men being killed or missing. Most of the victims' bodies were then relocated and buried in mass graves away from the crime scene. In 2020, Darko Tasić, a local Serb from the same village and member of the police reserve forces was convicted as one of the perpetrators of the massacre.

One of witnesses of the murder was British journalist John Sweeney, who was in the place of the murder in that time, saw disposal of dead bodies in the Drini river, and later was an important witness of the trials of Krusha massacres.

The International Criminal Tribunal for the former Yugoslavia (ICTY) classified it as murder, persecution and forcible transfer, and sentenced five Yugoslav officials. Slobodan Milošević was also indicted by the ICTY for the same crime, but died before a verdict was reached.

== War crime trials ==
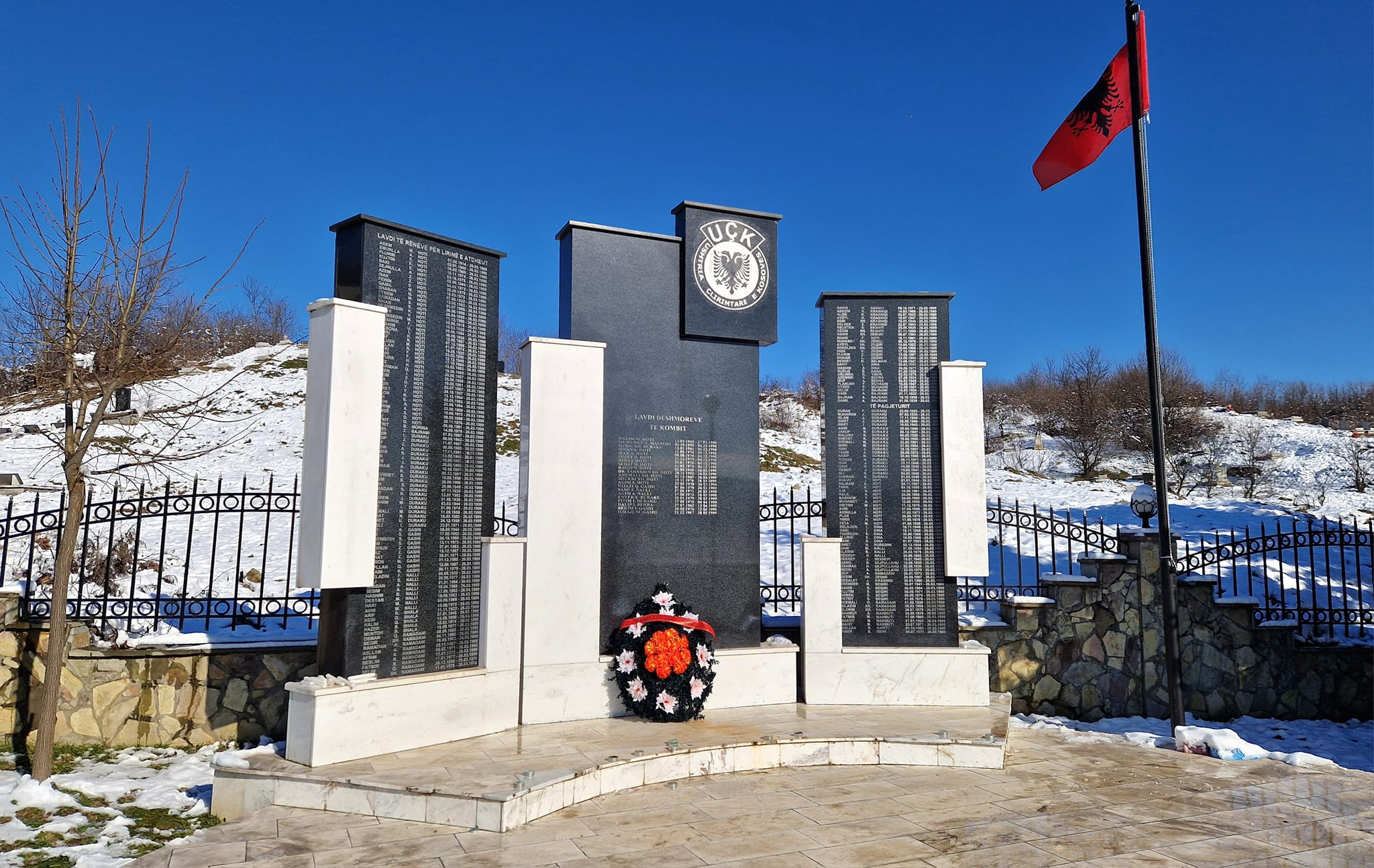
Monument to the victims in Krushë e Madhe.

The massacre at Krushë e Madhe became a part of war crimes indictment against Slobodan Milošević and other Serbian political and military leaders:

On or about 25 March 1999, the villages of Velika Kruša and Mala Kruša/Krushe e Madhe and Krushe e Vogel were attacked by forces of the FRY and Serbia.

Village residents took refuge in a forested area outside Velika Kruša/Krushe e Madhe, where they were able to observe the police systematically looting and then burning the villagers' houses.

On or about the morning of 26 March 1999, Serb police located the villagers in the forest.

The police ordered the women and small children to leave the area and to go to Albania. The police then searched the men and boys and took their identity documents, after which they were made to walk to an uninhabited house between the forest and Mala Kruša/Krushe e Vogel.

Once the men and boys were assembled inside the house, the police opened fire on the group.

After several minutes of gunfire, the police piled hay on the men and boys and set fire to it in order to burn the bodies. As a result of the shootings and the fire, approximately 105 Kosovo Albanian men and boys were killed by the Serb police.

— War Crimes Indictment against Milošević and others

The International Criminal Tribunal for the former Yugoslavia (ICTY) classified it as a crime against humanity through murder, persecutions and inhumance acts (forcible transfer), and sentenced Yugoslav police colonel general Vlastimir Đorđević to 27 years in prison, and included him in a joint criminal enterprise. It established that at least 104 Kosovo Albanians were ordered into a barn in Mala Kruša, shot dead, and then burned by the Serb/Yugoslav MUP forces on 26 March 1999. Three other men were shot while trying to flee. Additionally, nine were burned to death in their houses a day earlier, set on fire by the Serb forces. In July 1999, a British forensic team undertook an investigation in Mala Kruša, but the site was blown up in the meantime, and only parts of 10 corpses were discovered, all cremated. Thus, only two corpses could be identified, but a cause of death could not be established. Nonetheless, the ICTY verdict accepted the testimony of one of the survivors to determine that murders did occur. In the appeal judgement, Đorđević's sentence was reduced to 18 years.

The ICTY also sentenced Deputy Prime Minister of FR Yugoslavia Nikola Šainović to 18 years of imprisonment, general Sreten Lukić to 20 years, general Vladimir Lazarević to 14 years, and general Nebojša Pavković to 22 years. It found they were part of a joint criminal enterprise aiming to forcibly displace Albanians from Kosovo. The trial of Slobodan Milošević remained incomplete due to Milošević's death.

== See also ==
- List of massacres in the Kosovo War
- War crimes in the Kosovo War
