= Bellacërkë =

Fortesë (Bellacërkë): Fortesë (Albanian)
- Village
- Location within Kosovo
- Coordinates: 42°21′N 20°35′E
- Location: Kosovo
- District: Gjakovë
- Municipality: Rahovec

Population (2024)
  - Total: 1,582
- Time zone: UTC+1 (CET)
  - Summer (DST): UTC+2 (CEST)

Fortesë (Bellacërkë) (Albanian: Fortesë) (Serbian: Bela Crkva/Бела Црква) is a village in the municipality of Rahovec of the District of Gjakova. Before 1999 the village was called Bela Crkva.

== Demographics ==
As of 2024, the village had a total population of 1,582 people. Of this, approximately 98.79% were Albanians, while Ashkalis and Egyptians made up 1.21%.

== History ==
The village Fortesë (Bellacërrkë/Bela Crkva) was mentioned as 'Beloçerkova' in the Ottoman register of the 16th century. The inhabitants of Fortesë (Bellacërrkë/Bela Crkva) in the 16th century bore Albanian (Marku, Nika, Pepa, Vuja, Kragui, Bojçi) and Slavic surnames (Stojko, Radula, Janko, Pervane). The villagers predominantly had Islamic names. The mansions ('Bashtina') listed bore Islamic, Albanian and Slavic names.

On 25 March 1999, one day after NATO began bombing the Federal Republic of Yugoslavia, the village of Bellacërrkë was the site of a mass killing, during which over 60 ethnic Albanian civilians were executed by Serbian forces.
