= SIG Sauer SIG516 =

Family of rifles manufactured by SIG Sauer

SIG 516
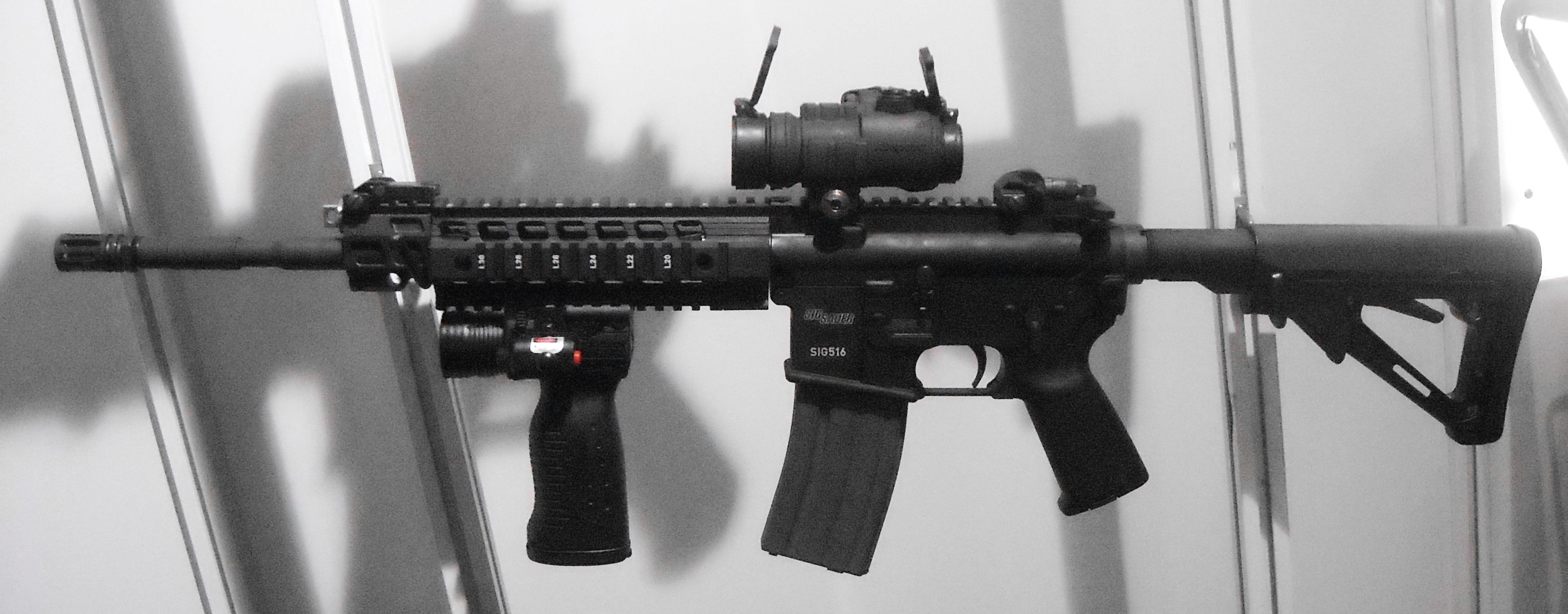
- The SIG 516 Tactical Patrol 14.5"
- Type: Semi-automatic rifle (civilian versions); Assault rifle (SIG516); Battle rifle (SIG716)
- Place of origin: United States

Service history
- In service: 2010–present
- Used by: See Users
- Wars: Kurdish–Turkish conflict Russian invasion of Ukraine

Production history
- Designed: 2000s
- Manufacturer: SIG Sauer
- Produced: 2010–2019; 2025–present (SIG516 G3)
- Variants: SIG716

Specifications
- Mass: 3.3 kg (7.28 lb) 406 mm barrel
- Length: 920–947 mm (36.22–37.28 in) 406 mm barrel
- Barrel length: 406 mm (16.0 in)
- Cartridge: 5.56×45mm NATO (SIG516); 7.62×39mm (SIG516); 7.62×51mm NATO (SIG716); 6.5mm Creedmoor (SIG716)
- Action: Short-stroke piston, rotating bolt
- Rate of fire: 750-950 rounds/minute
- Muzzle velocity: 850 m/s (2,789 ft/s) 406 mm barrel
- Effective firing range: 500 m (550 yd)
- Feed system: 10, 20, 30-round detachable magazine
- Sights: Iron sights or picatinny rail for various optics

The SIG Sauer SIG516 is an assault rifle and a semi automatic rifle manufactured by SIG Sauer, chambered in 5.56×45mm NATO.

== History ==
The SIG Sauer SIG516 shares lineage with the Heckler & Koch HK416. The principal firearms engineers for the SIG516 were Robert Hirt and Chris Sirois. Following his time with Heckler & Koch, Hirt was recruited by SIG Sauer to work with then SIG engineer Chris Sirois on an improved version of the HK416. The SIG516 omitted many proprietary HK416 components that were exchanged for standard (M4 carbine mil spec conform) components. Other HK416 issues like the (at the time) high cyclic rate, which causes lower life cycle, a gas vent, which showed up in low light conditions, and safety issues (i.e. the need for a firing pin safety) were also addressed. Hirt and Sirois later designed the SIG716 and SIG MCX/SIG MPX. They were later recruited by Caracal to develop the CAR 816 series.

== Design details ==
=== Operating mechanism ===
Short-stroke gas piston

The SIG516 is a multi-caliber assault rifle capable of selective fire. It fires from a closed bolt, and it has a short-stroke push rod piston system. The gas piston pushes the bolt carrier rearward where it is returned to the forward and locked position by a spring. This process loads the next cartridge. The 516 has a four-position gas regulator, allowing the user to choose the amount of gas directed to the piston, to adjust the gas system to function reliably with various propellant, projectile, fouling, operating environment, and configuration-specific pressure behavior.

=== Features ===
The SIG516 is based on the AR-15 platform ergonomic architecture, but it uses a short-stroke gas piston operating system (unlike the AR-15's piston-operated gas impingement system). The SIG516 uses a proprietary bolt carrier and government (law enforcement and military contract select-fire) rifles a special tungsten granules containing buffer to manage bolt carrier bounce and soften recoil. The barrel is chrome-lined. The amount of movement between the upper and lower receiver is minimized by a rubber wedge.

The SIG516 has a safety lever on the left side to be used by the thumb of the shooting hand. The gas block integrates an adjustable gas regulator. The front gas block is railed to accept the front sight with a flip-up sight post. SIG516 models are equipped with an M16A2 style bird-cage flash hider.

All SIG516 models except the Marksman are equipped with 16-inch (406 mm) barrels shrouded by a free-floating M1913 Picatinny rail, as well as flip-up iron sights (BUIS) made by SIG Sauer.

The 5.56×45mm NATO SIG516 models accept STANAG box magazines. These magazines are constructed in 5-, 10-, 20-, and 30-round variants. SIG516 Russian rifles use a different magazine as they are chambered in 7.62×39mm. The SIG516 Russian uses magazines designed for 7.62×39mm AR-15 style rifles. The rifle is hammer-fired and has a two-stage trigger mechanism in the SIG516 Marksman while all others have a military specification single-stage trigger.

It is built to pass the NATO test protocol "Over the Beach", meaning the SIG516 is designed to fire safely as quickly as possible after being submerged in water.

== Variants ==
=== SIG516 Precision Marksman ===
The SIG516 Precision Marksman has a longer 457 mm (18.0 in) barrel and an adjustable stock. It weighs 3.5 kg (7.72 lb) and has a length of 914–1,003 mm (35.98–39.49 in). The barrel is chrome-lined. Iron and or optical sights are installed on an integral MIL-STD-1913 Picatinny rail on the top of the receiver and additional accessories can be mounted on the fore end quad rails.

=== SIG716 ===
The SIG716 is a battle rifle variant, which is based on the same design, but is chambered for the larger 7.62x51mm NATO round and uses SR-25 pattern magazines.

=== SIG716 G2 ===
The SIG716 G2 (Generation 2) variant features a short-stroke pushrod gas system. This operating system reduces carbon fouling, excessive heat and unburned powder in the action, ensuring further improved reliability and function. The G2 Patrol model is chambered in 7.62×51mm NATO, while the G2 DMR model is chambered in 6.5mm Creedmoor.

=== SIG 716i ===
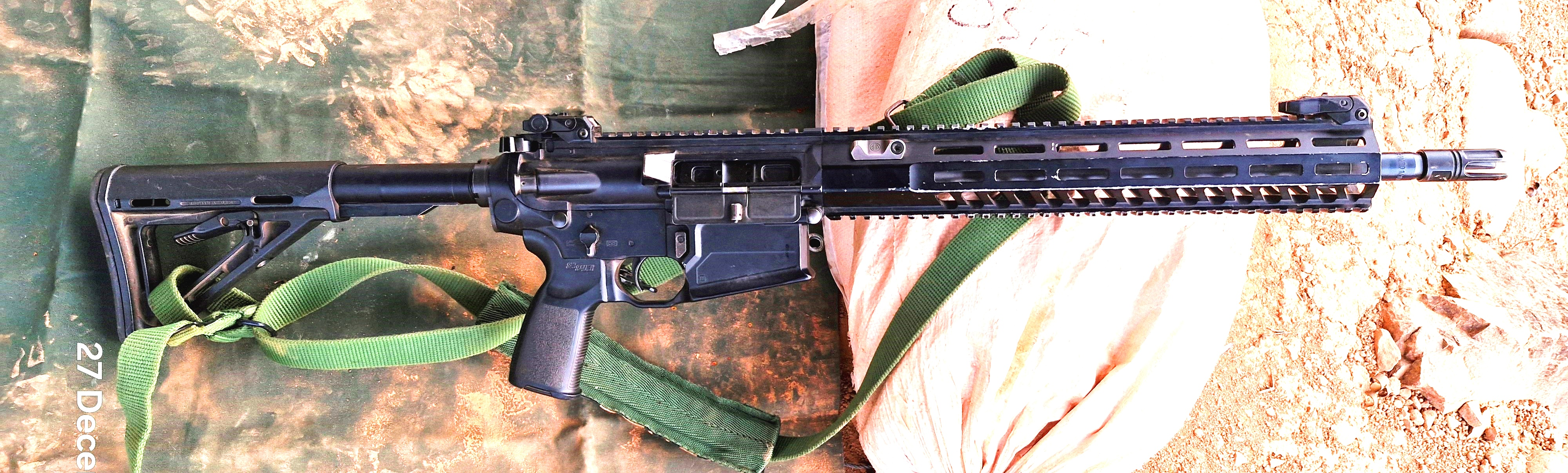
SIG Sauer SIG716i deployed by Indian Army. The rifle is without the magazine.

The 716i (impingement) variant features a gas-operated, rotating bolt (internal piston) system instead of short-stroke pushrod gas system. This Stoner bolt and carrier piston operating system has helped SIG Sauer to bring down the cost of manufacturing and pushing more sales of 716i, whilst also achieving a weight reduction. The 716i is chambered in 7.62×51mm NATO. Sig Sauer appears to have discontinued SIG716 and SIG716 G2 models, since the company stopped displaying these products in their website, while they continue to sell magazines and spare parts in their online store. The 716i has been recognized as the best AR-10 rifle for the year 2020, by readers' choice voting of Ballistic magazine.

=== SIG516 G3 ===
In November 2025, SIG released the SIG516 G3.

== Users ==
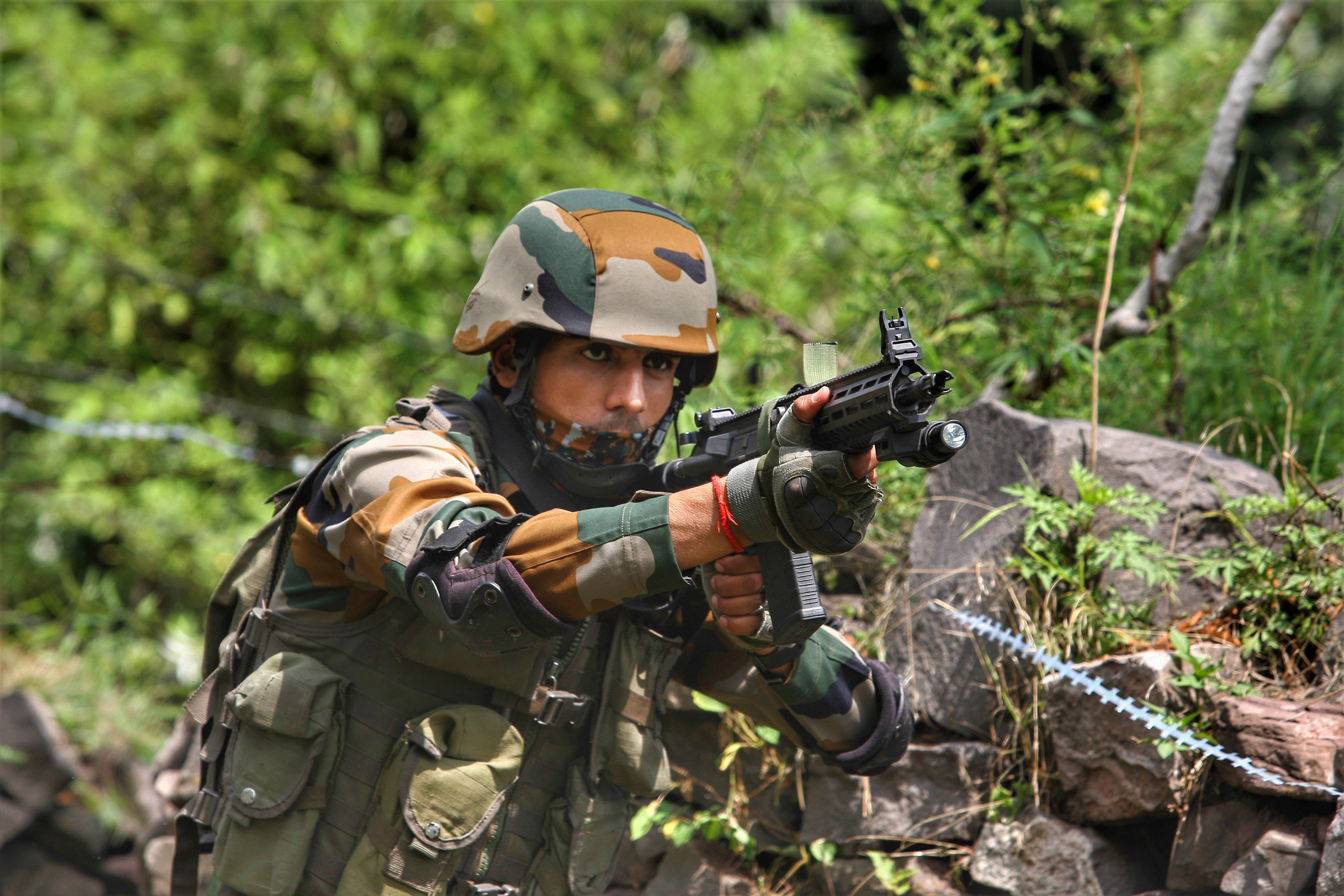
Indian Army soldier of the White Knight Corps aimimg his SIG 716i during a training exercise, 2021

- Argentina: Used by law enforcement
- Canada: Used by Canadian Special Operations Forces Command
- Egypt: Used by Navy El-Sa'ka Forces
- Georgia: In use with the Georgian MIA and MOD special forces
- Hong Kong: Used by the Hong Kong Police Force including the Special Duties Unit and the Counter Terrorism Response Unit
- India: Order placed for 72,400 units of SIG 716 variant. In December 2019, the first lot of 10,000 rifles was delivered to the Indian Army's Northern Command. SIG Sauer also confirmed that delivery of the first order has already been completed. Another batch of 70,000 rifles was cleared for order in December 2023. The deal for an order of 73,000 rifles (that was cleared in 2023) was signed on 26 August 2024 and will be produced in India along with Pune-based Nibe Group with complete rifle manufacturing from 2025. The rifles are being equipped with night sight from MKU.
  - Indian Army: 66,400 units in service, 73,000 on order
  - Indian Air Force: 4,000 in service
  - Indian Navy: 2,000 in service
- Indonesia: SIG516 Patrol in use by the Mobile Brigade of the Indonesian National Police, and SIG716 G2 by special operations units of the Indonesian National Armed Forces.
- Mexico: Transitioning into the general service rifle of the Naval Infantry Force
- Pakistan: Used by Special Service Group (Navy).
- Philippines: Philippine Army with 832 SIG716 G2 DMRs ordered from SIG Sauer as part of the Designated Marksman Rifle acquisition project under the Horizon 1 project. Expected to replace the M14.
- Peru: SIG516 and SIG716 variants used by Subunidad de Acciones Tácticas of Peruvian Police
- Serbia: Used by PTJ (Counter-Terrorist Unit) of Serbian Police
- Switzerland: Used by the Mobilen Einsatzpolizei of the Aargau Police
- Trinidad and Tobago: Used by the Trinidad and Tobago Police Service
- Thailand: Used by Naval Special Warfare Command, Royal Thai Fleet (Thai Navy SEALs)
- Turkey: Used by Police Special Operation Department and Police Counter Attack Teams
- United Kingdom: Used by Metropolitan Police Counter Terrorist Specialist Firearms Officers (CTSFO), Staffordshire Police, and West Midlands Police
- United States: Used by Florida Highway Patrol when purchased in 2019, Delaware State Police when purchased in 2012, and also by Cincinnati Police Department SWAT, as well as the Anderson County, South Carolina Sheriff's Office SWAT, and San Diego Police Department SWAT, in which the rifles will replace aging Vietnam-era M16s. Up to 500 716G2s ordered by U.S. Army through a commercial off-the-shelf contract in December 2018.
- Romania: Romania will replace its main service rifle with the SIG 516, around 100,000 SIG 516 will be produced in Romania within a contract of 300,000 arms.
