= Scorpions (paramilitary) =

Serbian paramilitary unit

- Шкорпиони; Škorpioni
- Insignia of the Scorpions paramilitary unit
- Active: 1991–1999
- Allegiance: SFR Yugoslavia; FR Yugoslavia; Serbian Krajina; Republika Srpska
- Branch: State Security Directorate
- Type: Paramilitary
- Patron: Saint Sava
- Colors: Black; Red
- Engagements: Croatian War of Independence; Battle of Vukovar; Berak massacre; Battle of Jasenovac; Bosnian War; Bijeljina massacre; Siege of Srebrenica; Operation Krivaja '95; Srebrenica massacre; Siege of Goražde; Operation Spider; Kosovo War; Podujevo massacre

Insignia
- Flag

The Scorpions (Serbian: Шкорпиони / Škorpioni) were a Serb paramilitary unit active during the Yugoslav Wars. The unit was involved in war crimes during the wars in Croatia, Bosnia and Herzegovina, and Kosovo. After the wars, four members of the unit were found guilty of killing six prisoners during the Srebrenica massacre of July 1995 and five were found guilty of killing fourteen civilians, mostly women and children, during the Podujevo massacre in March 1999.

== History ==
The Scorpions were founded in 1991 by Jovica Stanišić, the head of Serbia's State Security Services, who also had a secret relationship with the Central Intelligence Agency. It began as a regular unit of the Yugoslav People's Army (JNA). They identified themselves as Chetniks. Dozens of men joined the unit in mid-1991. Initially composed of Serbs from eastern Slavonia, the unit began its operations during the Battle of Vukovar in late 1991. It was led by two brothers, Slobodan and Aleksandar Medić, and was named after their favourite weapon—the Škorpion vz. 61. The unit was one of several hundred armed groups used by Bosnian and Croatian Serb military authorities for the purpose of terrorizing the non-Serb population in the Republika Srpska and the Republic of Srpska Krajina. In 1992, the Scorpions came under the command of the Serbian Army of Krajina.

The Scorpions became part of the Serbian Ministry of Internal Affairs at some point in 1995. They participated in the Srebrenica massacre in July 1995, and filmed the execution of six Bosnian Muslims near the village of Trnovo, named The Scorpions, A Home Movie. In 2021, a mass grave containing at least 10 Srebrenica victims was confirmed near Kalinovik, within the Scorpions' area of operation.

During the Kosovo War, the Scorpions were placed under the command of the Special Anti-Terrorist Unit (SAJ). They were involved in the Podujevo massacre in March 1999. The massacre resulted in the deaths of 14 Kosovo Albanians, mostly women and children. Following the Yugoslav Wars, the majority of soldiers who fought with the Scorpions moved to the town of Šid. Some remained in Vukovar.

=== Prosecutions ===
In 2004, Saša Cvjetan was charged for his role in the Podujevo massacre and was sentenced by a Serbian court to a twenty-year jail term. In 2009, four more Scorpions were jailed in Serbia for their role in the massacre. Željko Đukić, Dragan Medić and Dragan Borojević received twenty-year sentences, while Miodrag Šolaja received a fifteen-year sentence. In 2005, a videotape showing the Scorpions killing six Bosniak prisoners was shown at the trial of Slobodan Milošević. The tape caused an uproar in Serbia and the actions of the Scorpions were condemned by many politicians. Several members of the unit were quickly arrested. Five members of the unit were charged with the murders. In 2007, Slobodan and Branislav Medić were jailed for twenty years, Pera Petrašević was jailed for thirteen years, Aleksandar Medić was sentenced to five years and Aleksandar Vukov was acquitted.

Scorpion member Milorad Momić, who lived under the name Guy Monier in France, was arrested by Interpol in 2011. Slobodan Medić, his wife and son were killed in a car accident in Serbia in December 2013. Medić was returning to prison after having been granted weekend leave by prison authorities.

== In popular culture ==
A fictionalized version of the Scorpions is depicted in the 2013 film Killing Season, starring Robert de Niro and John Travolta.

In the 2016 film Captain America: Civil War, the primary villain, Baron Helmut Zemo, was a Colonel in a covert paramilitary deathsquad known as "EKO Scorpion" in the fictional Eastern European country of Sokovia.

They are also mentioned briefly in the fourth episode of Seal Team.

== Bibliography ==
- Gordy, Eric (2013). Guilt, Responsibility, and Denial: The Past at Stake in Post-Milošević Serbia. Philadelphia: University of Pennsylvania Press. ISBN 978-0-8122-4535-6.
- Totten, Samuel; Bartrop, Paul R. (2008a). Dictionary of Genocide: A−L. Westport, Connecticut: Greenwood Publishing Group. ISBN 978-0-313-32967-8.
- Totten, Samuel; Bartrop, Paul R. (2008b). Dictionary of Genocide: M−Z. Westport, Connecticut: Greenwood Publishing Group. ISBN 978-0-313-34644-6.
