= Krushë e Madhe =

Village in western Kosovo

Krushë e Madhe Велика Круша Velika Kruša
- Village
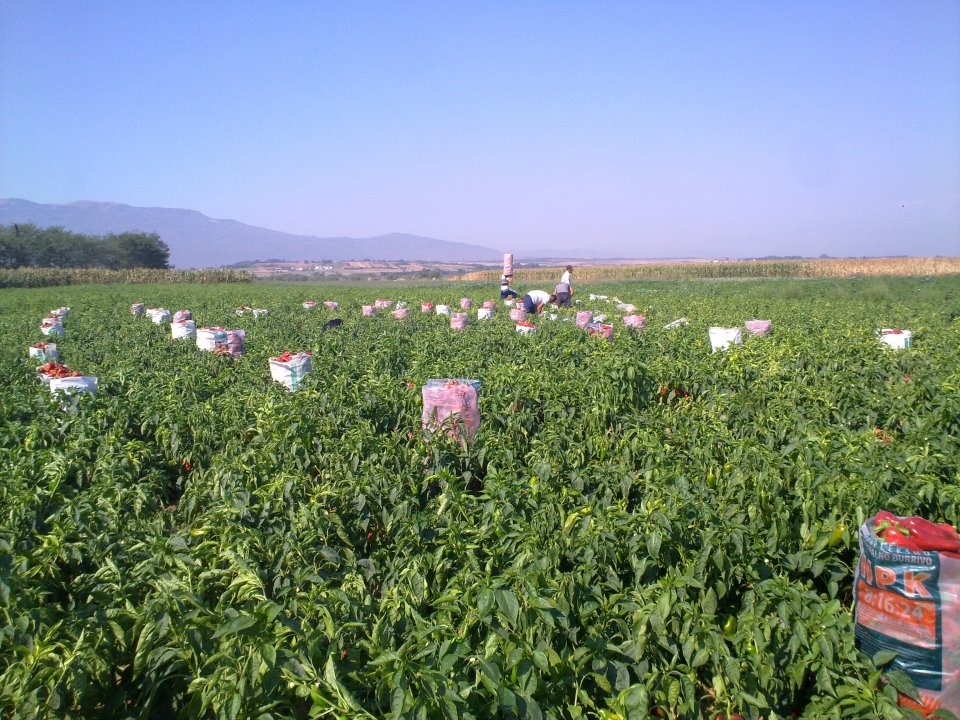
- Bell pepper field in Krushë e Madhe

- Location in Kosovo
- Country: Kosovo
- District: Gjakova
- Municipality: Rahovec

Population (2024)
  - Total: 3,183
- Time zone: UTC+1 (CET)
  - Summer (DST): UTC+2 (CEST)

Krushë e Madhe (Serbian: Велика Круша, romanized: Velika Kruša) is a village in the municipality of Rahovec of western Kosovo. It was a stronghold of the Kosovo Liberation Army during the Kosovo War. On 26 March 1999, the Yugoslav Army massacred over a hundred unarmed Kosovo Albanian civilians in the village in retaliation for the NATO bombing of Yugoslavia.

== History ==
Krushë e Madhe was mentioned as Gorna Krusha in the Ottoman register of the Sanjak of Prizren in 1591. The villagers primarily had Islamic names, though there were also Albanian and Slavic names present. The mansions (Bashtina) listed mostly bore Islamic names, but there were two Slavic names.

Bajram Curri, an Albanian independence activist from the Highlands of Gjakova, was born in Krushë e Madhe in 1862 while his family was being transferred by the Ottoman authorities from Gjakova to a prison in Prizren.

During the Kosovo War, Krushë e Madhe was a stronghold of the Kosovo Liberation Army. NATO began bombing Yugoslavia on 24 March 1999, prompting the Yugoslav Army to massacre unarmed Kosovo Albanian civilians in reprisal attacks. On 26 March, the Yugoslav Army rounded up the men and boys of Krushë e Madhe inside a building and opened fire on them. More than 100 people were reported killed or missing. The bodies were then set alight, with some beheaded or hastily buried. Selami Helshami was the sole survivor of the massacre; he was protected from the bullets by the corpses of those slain before him, but suffered serious burns over much of his body. He helped direct British journalists to the site of the massacre, and in April the BBC broadcast footage it had smuggled out of Yugoslavia detailing evidence of the killings.

== Demographics ==
The 2011 census recorded 4,473 residents in Krushë e Madhe; the population decreased to 3,183 by the time of the 2024 census.

== Notable people ==
- Ukshin Hoti, Albanian philosopher and activist
- Lumbardh Dellova, Kosovar footballer
