= Rezallë =

Village in Skenderaj, Kosovo

- Village
- Interactive map of Rezallë
- Coordinates: 42.689°N 20.769°E
- Country: Kosovo
- District: Mitrovica
- Municipality: Skenderaj
- Elevation: 736 m (2,415 ft)

Population (2024)
  - Total: 1,286
- Time zone: UTC+1 (CET)
  - Summer (DST): UTC+2 (CEST)

Rezallë (Albanian definite form: Rezalla) is a village in the municipality of Skenderaj, Kosovo. The village, as of 2024, has a population of 1,286 inhabitants and is located around 12 kilometres (7.5 mi) away from Skenderaj.

== History ==
During the Kosovo War, the village was the site of the Rezallë massacre where 98 Albanian civilians were killed by Serbian police forces.
