= Lloshkobare =

Village in Kosovo

- Village
- Location within Kosovo Location within Europe
- Coordinates: 42°23′40″N 21°7′24″E
- Country: Kosovo
- District: Ferizaj
- Municipality: Ferizaj

Population (2024)
  - Total: 1,991
- Time zone: UTC+1 (CET)
  - Summer (DST): UTC+2 (CEST)

Lloshkobare is a village in Ferizaj Municipality, Kosovo. According to the Kosovo Agency of Statistics (KAS) from the 2024 census, there were 2,075 people residing in Lloshkobare, with Albanians constituting the majority of the population.
