= Celinë =

Village in western Kosovo

Celinë Celina
- Village
- Location in Kosovo
- Location: Kosovo
- District: Gjakova
- Municipality: Rahovec

Population (2024)
  - Total: 1,271
- Time zone: UTC+1 (CET)
  - Summer (DST): UTC+2 (CEST)

Celinë (Albanian: Celinë) (Serbian: Celina/Целина) is a village in the municipality of Rahovec of western Kosovo. With a population of around 2,000.

== Demographics ==
As of 2024, the village had a total population of 1,271 people. Of this, approximately 94% were Albanians, while 6% were Ashkalis.

== History ==
The village was recorded in the Ottoman register of 1591. The village then had 19 households and mansions ('Bashtina'). The villagers were primarily characterized by Albanian (Gjoni, Nika, Pepa, Biba, Raja, Doda, Pali) anthropological traits, there was also a presence of Slavic (Stepan, Petric, Stojan) anthropology. The mansions ('Bashtina') listed bore Albanian, Slavic and Islamic names.

On 25 March 1999, one day after NATO began bombing the Federal Republic of Yugoslavia, the village of Celinë in Kosovo was the site of a mass killing, during which over 80 ethnic Albanian civilians were executed by Serbian forces.
