= Attacks on Likošane and Ćirez =

Part of Kosovo War

Coordinates: 42°41′N 20°54′E

- Part of the Kosovo War
Date	Battle: 28 February 1998-March 1 1998; Massacres: 1 – 7 March 1998
Location	Likošane and Ćirez, AP Kosovo, FR Yugoslavia (present-day Kosovo)
Result	Yugoslav victory: KLA withdrawal

Belligerents
Serbian police	Kosovo Liberation Army

Commanders and leaders
(Federal Republic of Yugoslavia) Goran Radosavljević	Adem Jashari (WIA); Ilaz Kodra

Units involved
(Federal Republic of Yugoslavia) Yugoslav Army; MUP; Special Operations Unit; Special Anti-Terrorist Unit	Kosovo Liberation Army

Strength
(Federal Republic of Yugoslavia) 30 APC's (Federal Republic of Yugoslavia) 20 helicopters	Unknown

Casualties and losses
(Federal Republic of Yugoslavia) 4 policemen killed (Federal Republic of Yugoslavia) 2 seriously wounded	16 killed
- 26 Albanian civilians killed

The Attacks on Likošane and Ćirez (Albanian: Sulmet në Likoshan dhe Çirez, Serbian: Napadi na Likošane i Ćirez) were large-scale police attacks that took place at the onset of the Kosovo War in the villages of Likošane and Ćirez.

On 28 February 1998, the Kosovo Liberation Army (KLA) ambushed a unit of the Serbian police near Likošane, killing four and seriously wounding two policemen. This prompted large-scale police operations in the villages of Likošane and Ćirez in the following day, leading to the killing of 16 KLA members and 26 Kosovo Albanian civilians in both villages. The attack on Likoshan and Çirez was followed by the Attack on Prekaz on the following days. The attacks on Likoshan and Çirez, as well as Prekaz, marked the beginning of the Kosovo War.

== Background ==
=== According to HRW (1998) ===
On 28 February 1998, according to Serbian police, armed Albanians attacked a police patrol near the village of Likošane, killing four policemen and seriously wounding two. A pro-government report told that there were three simultaneous attacks on police patrols. Albanians from Likošane informed Human Rights Watch (HRW) that they heard shooting near the village around 11 PM, and some heard that the police had been ambushed there. Unconfirmed reports tell that armed Albanians attacked the police-based ammunition plant near Donji Prekaz on 27 February and that the police were ambushed at Likošane after a police chase.

=== According to Amnesty International (1999) ===
Albanian witnesses stated that events began on the evening of 27 February, "when the KLA fired at a school housing Bosnian or Croatian Serb refugees in the nearby town of Srbica". According to Amnesty International:

The vehicle carrying KLA men was chased by police towards Likoshan and a short firefight ensued. Police brought in reinforcements and the KLA may also have done so. In the fighting which followed, apparently mainly on 28 February, the police used heavy force including armored vehicles and helicopters and the KLA apparently withdrew. Amnesty International believes that most of the ethnic Albanians who died were killed after the KLA had withdrawn as the police moved into the villages.

== Events ==
=== Likošane ===
Likošane killings
- Date: 28 February-1 March 1998; 3:30 PM–? (CET)
- Target: Kosovo Albanians
- Deaths: 11

The police arrived at Likošane between 11:30 AM and 12 PM, with a hovering police helicopter and many APCs and armed special police surrounding the house of the Ahmeti family. The family was the richest one in the village. Villagers told HRW that there were no KLA members present, though it is possible that shots were fired at the police.

In a quick and well-organized manner, suggesting that the attack was planned, the special police focused on two neighboring households, of the Gjeli and Ahmeti families. There are speculations over whether a KLA member entered and left the Ahmeti house. At ca. 3:30 PM, the police broke into the Ahmeti compound. Ten male members of the family, and a guest, aged between 16 and 50, were beaten and then extrajudicially executed.

The only Ahmeti brother to survive was away at the time, returning to Likoshan after hearing of the incident; according to him, as told to HRW, when he arrived at 8 AM on 1 March, looking from a hill, he saw "an APC in our compound and another outside. A third was behind. There was artillery all over and the police were shooting everywhere". According to him the police left 3:30 PM, he then went to his house and was told that ten male family members and a guest had been taken into custody. He also told HRW that furniture had been destroyed and valuables were stolen.

The Ahmeti family learned of the death of their men the next day, when a neighbor, of the Gjeli family, saw their bodies at the morgue while collecting the bodies of his two killed family members. On 3 March the bodies were buried, along with 15 other victims from Likoshan and Çirez. An American journalist told HRW that the Ahmeti bodies had clear signs of torture.

=== Ćirez ===
Ćirez killings
- Location: Çirez
- Date: 28 February-1 March 1998; 12:30 PM (CET)
- Target: Kosovo Albanians
- Deaths: 10

According to those present at that time, the Serbian Police arrived at 12:30 PM after shooting 6 oak logs. Witnesses told the HRW that seven APC's, along with one helicopter shooting down on rooftops, were present at the village. They first went up to the Nebihu family. They killed Rubika Nebihu, a 27 year-old woman who was seven months pregnant. They also killed the eldest son, Xhemsil. Sefer Nebihu, the father, told the HRW:

The police destroyed my front gate with two tanks and came up to the windows of my house. About seventeen policemen came out of the tanks. They wore military camouflage, green and yellow, with a police sign on their chests. No masks. The tank came up to the window. One policemen broke the window with the butt of his gun and started shouting. They said: "stand up" and I said "don't shoot because there are only women and children here." They cursed me and then one fired at me.

Another family to be attacked by the Serbian Police was the Sejdiu family. Four sons of the Sejdiu family were killed in Çirez, those being Bekim, Nazmi, Bedri, and Beqir. Abdia Sejdiu, the mother of the household, told HRW:

They [her sons] came to the field and we sat in one room. My daughter-in-law, two kids and my son. We heard fighting in Likoshan around noon. My sons were killed around 4 PM. The tanks came in the garden, they broke the gates and two tanks were outside the firing. Some seven to ten policemen broke into the house and our room. I stepped in front of the police and put my hands out in front of my sons. They took all of us into the garden. They say lie on the ground. They hit Bekim and I shouted "Don't you have any sons!" They hit me in the head with the end of the gun. They took all of my sons then I took the kids inside...

All 26 people killed in Likoshan and Çirez were buried in a field nearby the two villages. An estimated 30,000 people attended the ceremony. Police checkpoints on the major road prohibited more from joining.

== Aftermath ==
The Attack on Prekaz, also known as the Prekaz massacre, was an operation led by the Special Anti-Terrorism Unit of Serbia on 5 March 1998, to capture Kosovo Liberation Army (KLA) fighters deemed terrorists by Serbia. During the operation, KLA leader Adem Jashari and his brother Hamëz were killed, along with nearly 60 other family members.

Nataša Kandić of Belgrade's Humanitarian Law Center, accused Danica Marinković, formerly investigating judge of the Pristina District Court, of being responsible for the murders of the Ahmeti family. She claimed that Marinković gave the order to shoot the civilians. In response, Marinković accused Kandić of lying.

The attack was criticized by Amnesty International, which wrote in its report that: "all evidence suggests that the attack was not intended to apprehend armed Albanians, but to eliminate the suspects and their families." Serbia, on the other hand, claimed the raid was due to KLA attacks on police outposts.

== See also ==
- War crimes in the Kosovo War
- List of massacres in the Kosovo War

== Sources ==
- Krieger, Heike (2001). The Kosovo Conflict and International Law: An Analytical Documentation 1974-1999. Cambridge University Press. pp. 93–94. ISBN 978-0-521-80071-6.
- Abrahams, Fred; Andersen, Elizabeth (1998). Humanitarian Law Violations in Kosovo. Human Rights Watch. pp. 19–26. ISBN 978-1-56432-194-7.
- Amnesty International (1999). Kosovo: January 1998 to March 1999. Amnesty International.
- Henriksen, Dag (2007). Nato's Gamble: Combining Diplomacy and Airpower in the Kosovo Crisis, 1998–1999. Naval Institute Press. ISBN 9781591143581.
