= Counter-Terrorist Unit (Serbia) =

Former Serbian Police tactical unit

- Противтерористичка јединица (Serbian); Protivteroristička jedinica (Serbian)
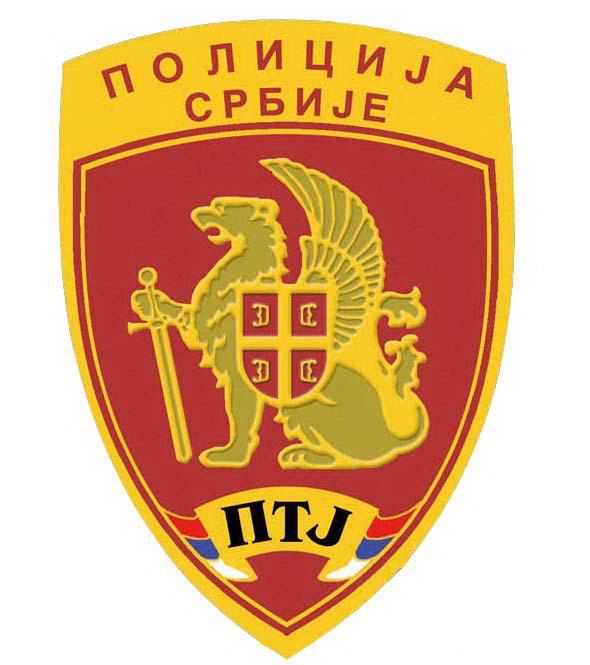
- Emblem of Counter-Terrorist Unit
- Active: 7 March 2003 – 2016
- Country: Serbia
- Agency: Ministry of Internal Affairs
- Type: Police tactical unit
- Role: Counter-terrorism; Law enforcement
- Headquarters: Lipovica
- Abbreviation: PTJ

Structure
- Sworn members: 215 (2012)

The Counter-Terrorist Unit (Serbian: Противтерористичка јединица / Protivteroristička jedinica, abbr. ПTJ / PTJ) was a police tactical unit of the Police of Serbia. The PTJ was initially established within the Gendarmery of the Police and in April 2007 was made an independent unit within the Directorate of the Police.

The PTJ was oriented towards anti-terrorism operations, as well as maintaining Serbia's internal security. Often only used in operations deemed too dangerous for other police units, it was highly trained and equipped. The PTJ's responsibilities included resolving hostage situations, anti-terrorist operations, high-profile arrests and bomb disposal.

== History ==
In 2016, the unit was disbanded and most of its members were incorporated into the Special Anti-Terrorist Unit (SAJ).

== Equipment and training ==
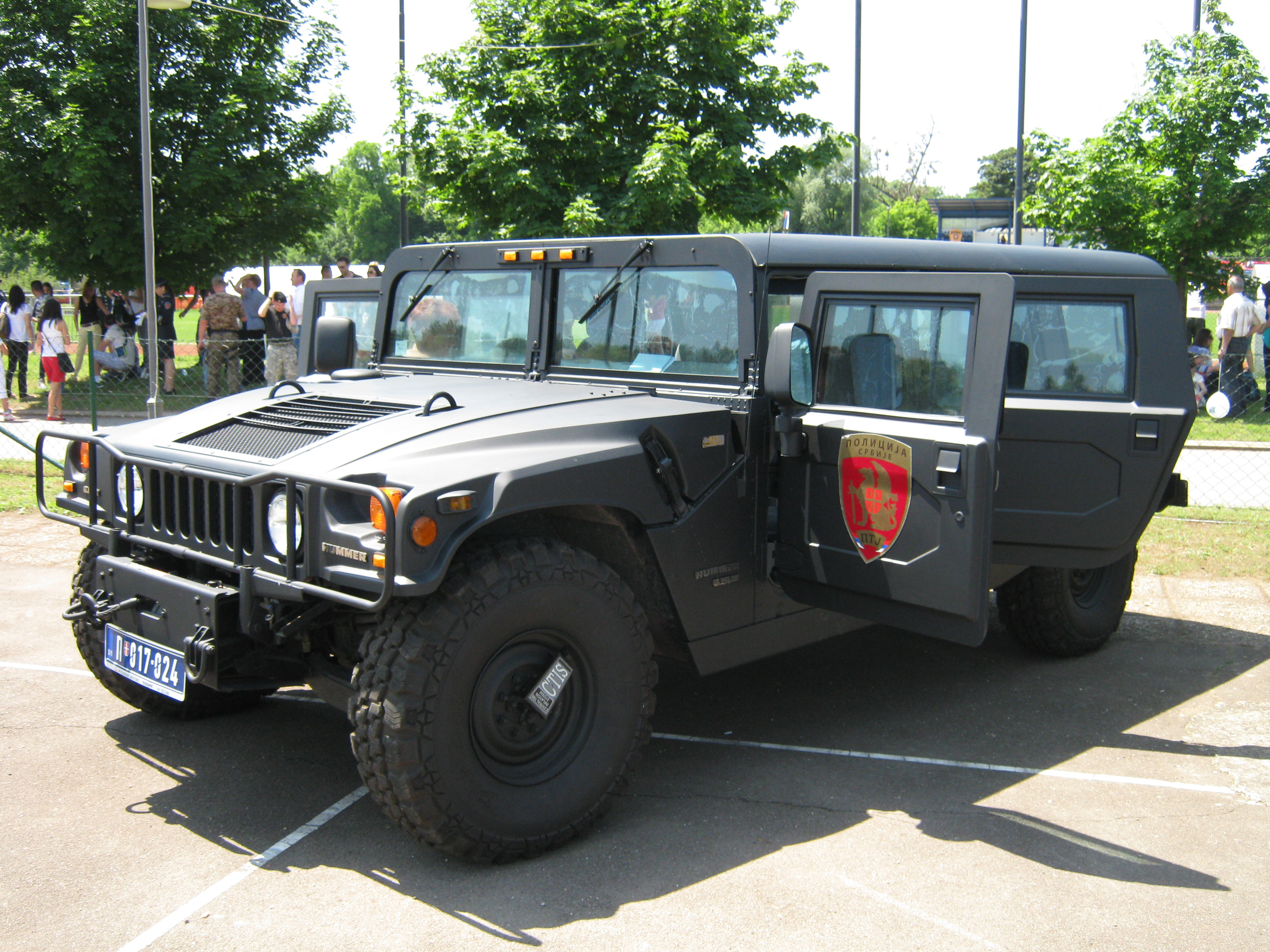
PTJ Humvee

Candidates were selected from the Gendarmery, who underwent rigorous physical evaluations before tactical training could begun. Lieutenant Colonel Dragović, the commander, stated in 2007 that out of 150 candidates only eight were selected in that year. Members of the PTJ were expected to meet and excel the criteria set before them. Trainees were exposed to varying conditions that they might find in real life operations. PTJ training centres were located at Petrovo Selo near Kula and Goč near Vrnjačka Banja.

Weapons used include:

- CZ 99
- Glock 17
- Beretta Px4 Storm
- Zastava M70
- M4 carbine
- SIG Sauer SIG516
- Heckler & Koch MP5
- Heckler & Koch UMP
- FAMAS
- DDR MpikM (AKM) rifle

== Publicly known operations ==
In 13 operations across eight cities in Serbia, the PTJ arrested numerous members of the so-called "Customs Mafia". They detained known organized crime leaders such as Sreten Jocić from the Netherlands; Dejan Milenković from Greece; Ridvan Rašitija from Switzerland; and extradited Abdelmajid Bouchar, (a member of "Al-Qaeda" suspected in connection with the 2004 Madrid train bombings), to Spain.

Others:

- 2007 - Arrested a large group of terrorists in an Islamic religious movement called the wahhabi on Mount Ninaja, killing one.
- 2009 - Hostage rescue in Jagodina (in central Serbia).

== See also ==
- Special Anti-Terrorist Unit
