= Volujak, Kosovo =

Village in Kosovo

Coordinates: 42.546111°N 20.585°E

Volujak (Albanian: Valljakë or Valljake; Serbian: Волујак/Volujak) is the name of a hamlet in Kosovo. There is peak 40 km (25 mi) to the west also called Volujak, or Maja e Vjelakut.
