= Talinoc i Muhaxhirëve =

Village in Kosovo

- Village
- Location within Kosovo Location within Europe
- Coordinates: 42°23′33″N 21°10′29″E
- Country: Kosovo
- District: Ferizaj
- Municipality: Ferizaj

Population (2024)
  - Total: 2,136
- Time zone: UTC+1 (CET)
  - Summer (DST): UTC+2 (CEST)

Talinoc i Muhaxhirëve, also known as Talinovce or Muhadžer Talinovac, is a village in Ferizaj Municipality, Kosovo. According to the Kosovo Agency of Statistics (KAS) from the 2024 census, there were 2,136 people residing in Talinoc i Muhaxhirëve, with Albanians constituting the majority of the population.

== History ==
Talinoc i Muhaxhirëve was founded by Albanian muhajirs in the second half of the 19th century, hence the name. After the war, the population structure shifted with increasing number of Albanians, so that in the 1990s, there were roughly twice the number of Albanians than Serbs. After the Kachak movement in Kosovo between 1918–1924, the Yugoslav government disarmed the village, which was administratively part of the Nerodimlje srez.

== Demography ==
=== Serb refugees ===
Before the Kosovo War, the village was ethnically mixed, with ca. 300 Serbs. In 1999, all Serbs were expelled. In 2006, 30 Serbs returned to the village. Until the murders, 18 Serbs lived in the village.

A married Serb couple, war refugees who had returned to the village, were murdered in their house on 6 July 2012. After the murders, the village Serbs asked the government to secure their relocation to either Strpce or Gracanica, or else they were to leave for Central Serbia.
