= Likoshan =

Likoshan Ликошане Likošane
- Village
- Location in Kosovo
- Location: Kosovo
- District: Pristina
- Municipality: Glogovac

Population (2024)
  - Total: 332
- Time zone: UTC+1 (CET)
  - Summer (DST): UTC+2 (CEST)

Likoshan (Albanian definite form: Likoshani), or Likošane (Serbian Cyrillic: Ликошане), is a village in the Glogovac municipality of Kosovo, in the region of Drenica.

Likoshan, along with the village of Çirez, was the site of a battle between the KLA and Serbian forces and a massacre, in February 1998 during the Kosovo War.
