= Çirez =

Village in Skenderaj, Kosovo

Çirez Ћирез Ćirez
- Village
- Location in Kosovo
- Coordinates: 42.714°N 20.902°E
- Location: Kosovo
- District: Mitrovicë
- Municipality: Skënderaj

Population (2024)
  - Total: 791
- Time zone: UTC+1 (CET)
  - Summer (DST): UTC+2 (CEST)

Çirez (Serbian: Ћирез, Ćirez) is a village in the municipality of Skenderaj, Kosovo.

== History ==
The village of Çirez was the site of a battle between the Kosovo Liberation Army and Serbian forces, known as the Attacks on Likoshan and Çirez. The Albanian civilians of the village were part of a massacre, in the 28th of February 1998 which marked the beginning of the Kosovo War.

== Demographics ==
According to the 2024 national census of the Kosovo Agency of Statistics, Çirez had a population of 791 inhabitants. The population of the village is entirely Albanian.
