= Special Anti-Terrorist Unit (Serbia) =

Serbian Police tactical unit

- Специјална антитерористичка јединица
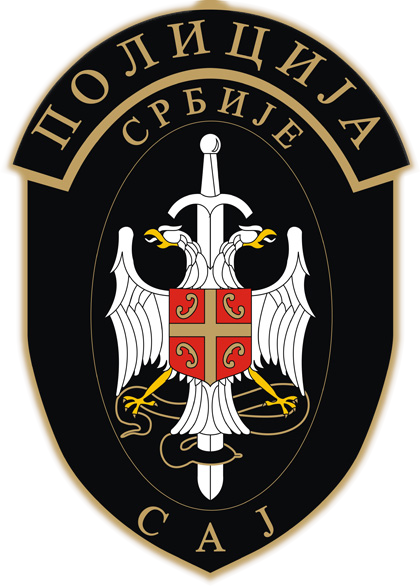
- Emblem of the Special Anti-Terrorist Unit
- Active: 1978 – present
- Country: Serbia
- Agency: Police of Serbia
- Type: Police tactical unit
- Role: Counter-terrorism; Law enforcement
- Operations jurisdiction: National
- Headquarters: Batajnica

Structure
- Members: ~300

Commanders
- Current commander: Col. Igor Žmirić

Notables
- Significant operation(s): Kosovo War; Attack on Prekaz; Attack on Orahovac; Attack on Likošane; Battle of Podujevo; Battle of Junik; Battle of Glođane; Yugoslav September Offensive (1998); Yugoslav offensive in Drenica (1998); Dečani operation; Insurgency in the Preševo Valley; Battle of Oraovica; Operation Sabre; Meljak shooting
- Anniversaries: 18 December

The Special Anti-Terrorist Unit (Serbian: Специјална антитерористичка јединица, romanized: Specijalna antiteroristička jedinica, abbr. САЈ / SAJ) is the police tactical unit of the Police of Serbia that specializes in anti-irregular forces in urban areas, apprehension of armed and dangerous criminals, hostage rescue crisis management, high-risk tactical special operations, international counterterrorism, quick raid to capture high-value targets, and VIPs protection.

== History ==
The history of the Special Anti-Terrorist Unit dates back to 18 December 1978 and the establishment of the Militia Unit for Special Actions (Jedinica Milicije za specijalna dejstva). The first base for the Milicija unit was at the militia station in New Belgrade. Its first commander was Miloš Bujenović. In 1983, the unit moved to Belgrade Airport in Surčin.

In 1991, the unit renamed as the Anti-Terrorism Unit (Antiteroristička jedinica). In 1992, during the reorganization of the Ministry of Internal Affairs and the Militia, the Anti-Terrorism Unit was placed under the Directorate of Public Security of the reorganized ministry. That same year, command was formed in Belgrade, with established branches in Novi Sad and Priština. Zoran Simović was the head of the then Belgrade unit, Novi Sad branch-unit was led by Branko Jurčić, and Priština branch-unit by Radoslav Stalević. At that period, the unit moved to the base in Batajnica, in which it has been ever since.

In 1994, the unit was renamed as the Special Anti-Terrorist Unit, which it bears to the current day. During the Kosovo War, the unit operated on the suppression of militants of the KLA. During these operations, sixteen members of the unit died in combat.

In 2015, the Counter-Terrorist Unit (established in 2003) was merged into the Special Anti-Terrorist Unit.

== Missions ==
Among the main missions of the Special Anti-Terrorist Unit are:

- High-risk tactical law enforcement situations.
- Hostage rescue situations.
- International counterterrorism.
- Providing security in areas at risk of terrorism.
- Serving high-risk arrest person and search warrants.
- Support crowd control and riot control.

== Structure ==
The Special Anti-Terrorist Unit is organized in four "teams" (timovi), platoon-size units, each with their own specializations.

Team A and Team B

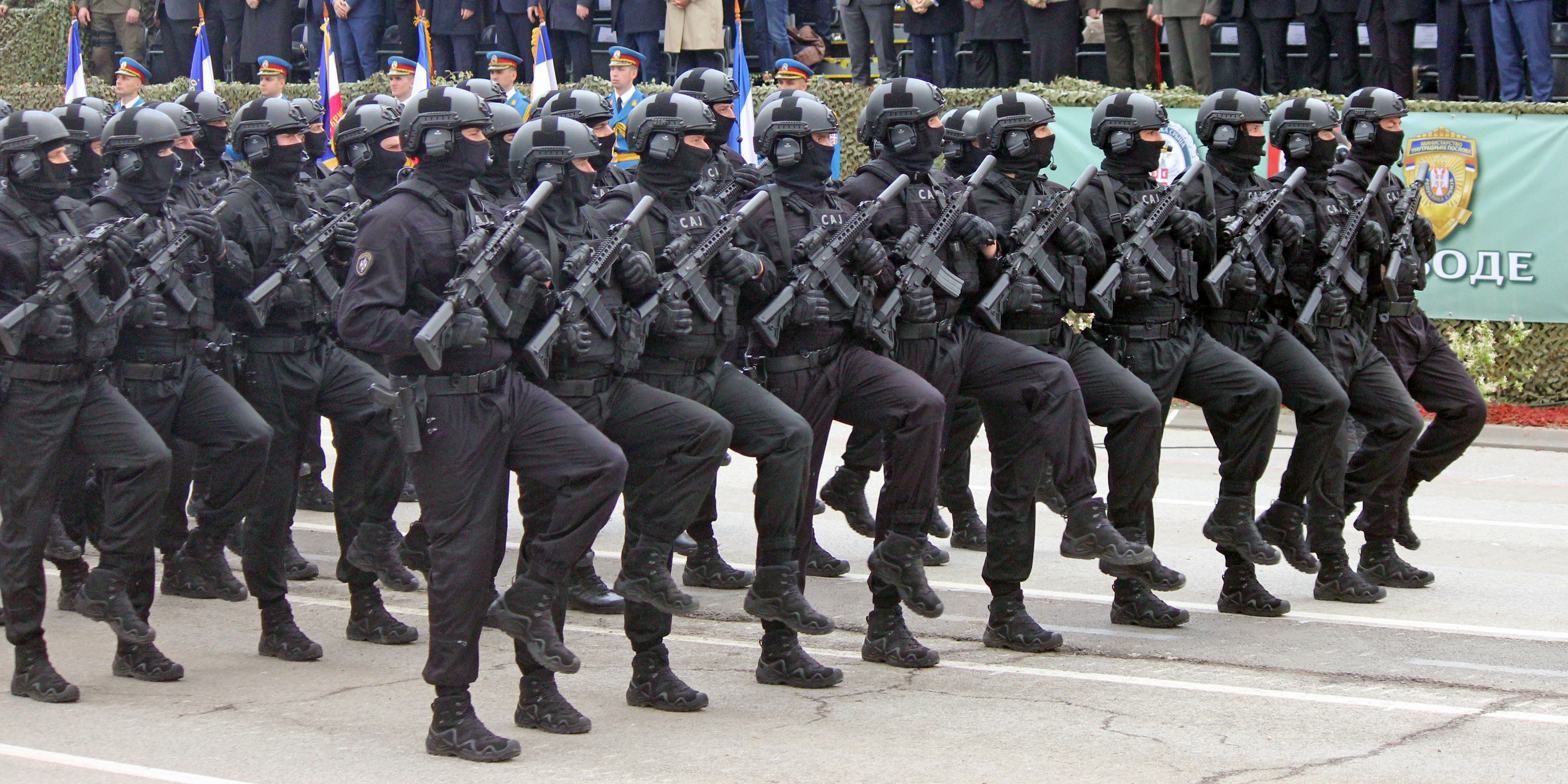
Echelon march of the Special Anti-Terrorist Unit members

The "first fist" is represented by that air assault operations, anti-hijacking, anti-irregular forces in urban areas, breaking into barred objects, control and protect criminals while they are on trial, hostage rescue, international counterterrorism, operating in difficult to access terrains, providing security to locations at high-risk of sabotage or being disturbed by social turmoil, serving high-risk arrest and search warrants, solve complicated hostile situations, special operations in dangerous areas, support crowd control operations during court proceedings or meetings, and VIP close protection.

Team C

Team C include: Dog training Group, Mine-explosive Substances and Biological-Chemical Products Group, Sniper/Counter-sniper Group, and Diving and Underwater Operations Group.

Team D

Team D provides the logistical support and include: the Construction and Testing of Arms and Ammunition Group, the Technical and Emergency Service Group, and the Medical Group.

== Equipment ==
The following equipment is in operational use as of 2024:

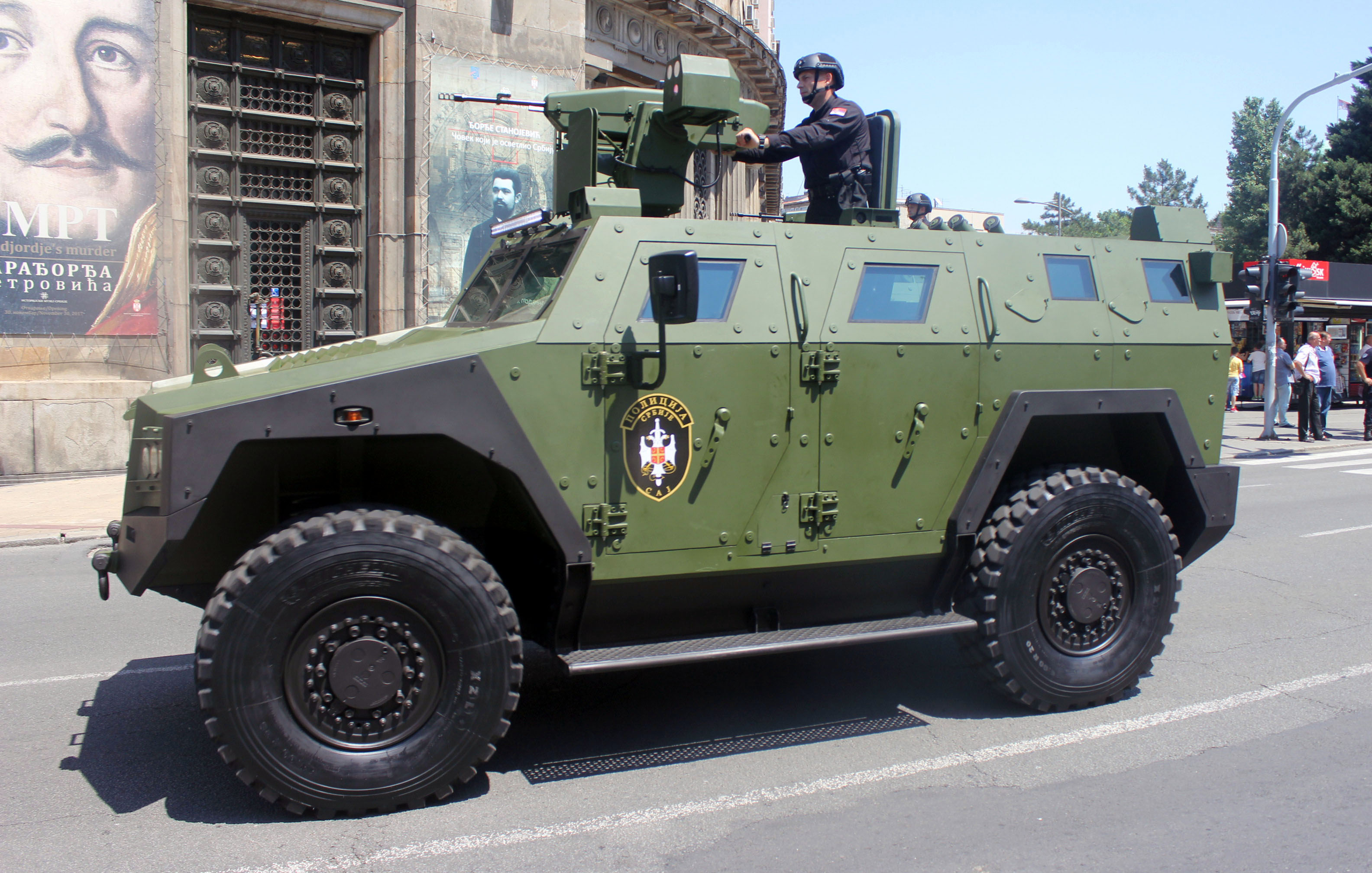
BOV M16 Miloš armored vehicle

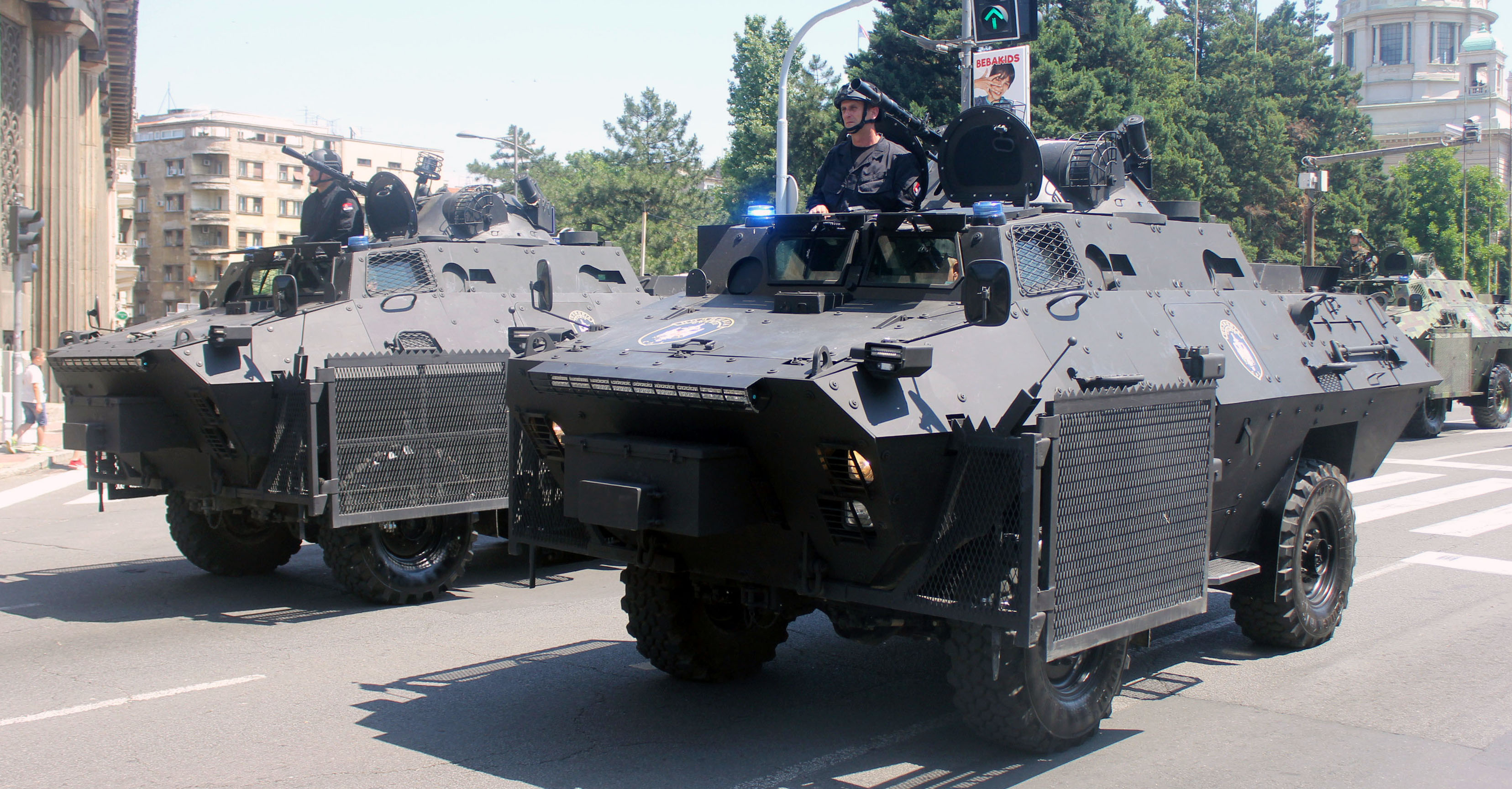
BOV M15 armored personnel carrier

=== Firearms ===
- Handgun:
  - Glock 17
- Shotgun:
  - Benelli M4
- Carbine:
  - Colt M4
  - SG 552 Commando
- Submachine gun:
  - Heckler & Koch MP5
- Assault rifle:
  - Zastava M21
- Sniper rifle:
  - Sako TRG

=== Vehicles ===
- Cars:
  - Mercedes-Benz G-Class
- Armored multipurpose vehicles:
  - BOV M16 Miloš
- Armored personnel carriers:
  - BOV M86 (2)

== Commanders ==
Since its establishment the Special Anti-Terrorist Unit has had eight commanders:

Name	Tenure
Col. Miloš Bujenović	1978–1984
Col. Radovan Stojičić "Badža"	1984–1991
Col. Miodrag Tepavčević	1991–1992
Col. Zoran Simović	1992–2000
Col. Živorad Trajković	2000–2002
Col. Milovan Glišović	2002–2005
Col. Spasoje Vulević	2005–2025
Col. Igor Žmirić	2025–present

== Traditions ==
=== Anniversary ===
The anniversary of the unit is celebrated on 18 December, in memory of the day in 1978 when the unit was established.

=== Patron saint ===
The unit's slava or its saint's feast day is Saint Michael the Archangel (Aranđelovdan).

=== Motto ===
Motto of the Brigade is: "One who dares - can, one who knows no fear - succeed!" (Ko sme, taj može, ko ne zna za strah, taj ide napred!). Author of the motto is Vojvoda Živojin Mišić, Serbian field marshal in the World War I.

== In popular culture ==
The Special Anti-Terrorist Unit appears in the video games Call of Duty: Modern Warfare (2019 video game) and Call of Duty: Mobile.

== See also ==
- Police of Serbia
