= Mirusha =

Mirusha (Albanian: Mirushë) may refer to:

- Mirusha River
- Mirusha Park
- Mirusha Waterfalls
