= Koznik Mountain =

Koznik is a small mountain in Kosovo. It is in the Metohija Valley and is 1,005 m (3,297 ft) high, which is quite small compared to some of Kosovo's higher mountains. The White Drin River flows to the west of Koznik while the Miruša flows to the north of Koznik.
