= Llapusha =

Geographic and ethnographic region in Kosovo

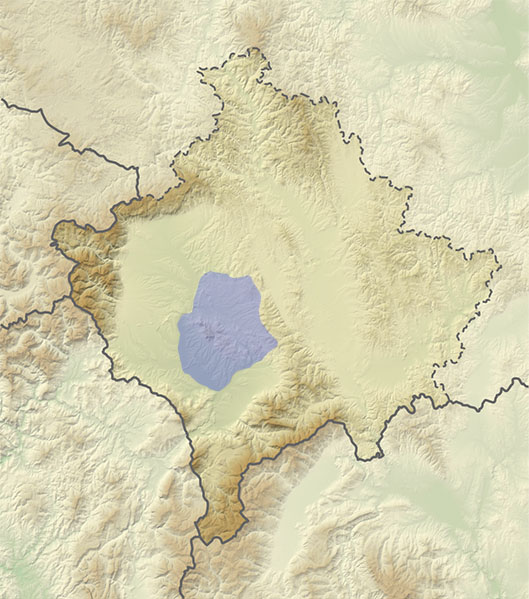
Llapusha

Llapusha (Albanian: Llapushë or Prekorupë, Albanian definite form: Llapusha or Prekorupa, Serbian: Прекорупље, romanized: Prekoruplje) is a geographic and ethnographic region in Kosovo that primarily stretches over the basin area of the lower Klina and Mirusha rivers, and consists of multiple settlements in the municipalities of Malisheva, Klina, Rahovec and Suhareka.

== Geography ==
Llapusha is a hilly region bordered by Klina, the White Drin, the Mirusha River and Drenica to the east, and is a border region of the Dukagjini Plain of western Kosovo. It stretches primarily over the basin area of two rivers, the lower Klina and the Mirusha River, and includes around 40 settlements. Mountain ranges in the areas of Llapusha and Drenica divide the Kosovo Field from the Dukagjini Plain, and thereby define the division between the Adriatic Sea basin on one side and the Black and Aegean sea basins on the other. Llapusha consists of villages in the municipalities of Malisheva, Klina, Rahovec and Suhareka.

== History ==
=== Antiquity ===
In Dresnik, a village of Llapusha in the municipality of Klina, exists an archaeological site dating back to the late Roman era. Systemic excavations and geophysical studies have revealed two phases of development during the Roman period, the first of which dates from the 2nd century to the first half of the 3rd century CE, and the second of which dates to the Tetrarchy period. Although archaeological data for the first phase is still scant, it is believed that this phase consisted of a villa rustica with baths, and probably a vicus nearby. The second phase was marked by the erection of fortifications with circular towers designed to protect monuments and buildings, such as two palaces and a horreum. Numerous inscriptions have been found at the site and studied by archaeologists.

=== Middle Ages ===
The Dečani chrysobulls of the 14th century provide toponymic and anthroponymic data that attest to the presence of Albanians in Llapusha during the 13th-14th centuries. Albanian names were recorded in the villages of Qabiqi, Percevël/Perqeva, Llapçevë/Llapqeva, Pogragjë/Pograxha and Krushqicë, for example, all of which are settlements in Llapusha. A stream known as Reg-jevski is recorded as a boundary of the village of Kijeva, which is now part of the municipality of Malisheva. This corresponds to Gllareva's Rigjeve quarter and links to the widespread medieval Albanian name Regj-Reç. During this time, the Albanians of Llapusha had to pay tithes on vineyards and wine, indicating that viticulture was one of their agricultural traditions. Additionally, Albanians were also prohibited from grazing their sheep in the property of the churches of Llapusha.

In the 1348 charters of Stefan Dušan, Albanian anthroponyms are recorded in five villages of Llapusha that exist to this day - Gollubovc/Gullboc (Malisheva), Bllaca (Suhareka), Ngucat (Malisheva), Kasterci/Kosterc (Suhareka) and Janqisht/Jançishta (Malisheva). Gollubovc is recorded as being inhabited by the Albanians Milesh and Malc, among others, whereas among the people who were tasked with bringing things to the monastery are Kosta Gonshin, Lalzin and his brother Andrea and the son-in-law Koloja. In Bllaca, the Albanians Doda (along with his brother and sons), Baljan, Beri and his sons, Bob and his sons, Milesh and Gonc Arbanasi and their sons are recorded. In Ngucat, the names Rob (twice), Balda and Baldovin are recorded. In Janqisht, the names Rog-ja and Laloje are recorded. In Kosterc, the names Ber (along with his sons), Bogda Tanušević (Tanushi), Poversko Semanović, Tul, Bujaçin, Puloça and Osmak are recorded. These are considered Albanian names that have been preserved to this day as family names and personal names, e.g. Tuli, Buja, Pulaha, Pula and Smaka. Part of Llapusha was included in the 1455 defter of the Branković lands.

=== 20th Century ===
The inhabitants of Llapusha took part in the Kachak Movement against Yugoslav rule. In Llapusha, the movement initially began on 6 May 1919, a date agreed on by the leaders of the uprising, such as Azem Galica and Sadik Rama, who had already begun the uprising in Drenicë.

Llapusha, like much of Kosovo, was one of the regions affected by the Yugoslav colonisation efforts, in which the Yugoslavs used agrarian reform as a cover for colonizing Kosovo with Slavic settlers, aiming to alter its predominantly-Albanian ethnic makeup, weaken Albanian national unity, and secure border areas through ethnic cleansing and military settlement. The policy deliberately targeted ethnically homogeneous Albanian regions - such as Llapusha, Drenica, Llapi, and other parts of Kosovo — for colonization.

During World War II, large Chetnik forces attacked Novi Pazar, Llap and Drenica in the autumn of 1941, all of which were at this point in time under Italian control and local Albanian administration. These attacks prompted the local administration under Xhafer Deva to mobilise volunteers from Rugova, Podguri, Drenica and Llapusha to protect these territories, and more particularly to protect Novi Pazar, which was repeatedly attacked by thousands of Chetnik forces over the following months. During these engagements, the leader of the volunteers from Llapusha was Qazim Bajraktari. In November 1943, the Chetniks launched another large-scale attack on Novi Pazar, and volunteers from numerous Albanian territories were once again mobilised in response. This time, the volunteers from Llapusha were led by Qazim Bajraktari and Alush Smajli.

== Demographics ==
Llapusha is predominantly inhabited by Albanians. There is a small Romani community.

== Anthropology ==
=== Middle Ages ===
Albanian toponymy and anthroponomy in Llapusha were recorded in the Dečani chrysobulls of the early-mid 14th century, attesting to the presence of Albanians in the region during the pre-Ottoman period of Kosovo's history. Aside from typical Albanian anthroponyms present in both the local microtoponymy and in medieval sources which refer to Llapusha, there are numerous anthroponyms used by the Albanians of Llapusha and elsewhere during the Middle Ages or earlier that fell out of use long ago and now survive only in written records, nicknames, microtoponyms and genealogies.

The Maketa quarter of the village of Llazica (Malisheva) preserves the early Christian Albanian anthroponym Mak with the suffix -et in nearby toponyms like Shpati Maketës (Maket's Slope), Gryka Maketës (Maket's Gorge), and Lugi/Prroni Maketës (Maket's Dale or Stream). The anthroponym Mak appears in Stefan Dušan’s 1348 chrysobull and in relation to the villages of Gollubovc/Gullboc and Pllaqica/Plloçicë — possibly in the same area as today's Maketa quarter. It is likely that Mak was the local chief of this area, and his name later gave rise to the Maketa brotherhood. Local legends exist regarding Maketa, such as one which states that the Maketa were blacklisted by the Ottomans for having fought against Ottoman soldiers. According to local legends, one of Maketa's brothers was named Plakiq, which is formed from the Albanian anthroponymic root Plak and the Slavonic suffix -iq. Plakiq has been preserved alongside Maketa in local microtoponymy, such as in Lugi Plakiqit (Plakiq's dale), Shpati i Plakiqit (Plakiq's slope), and Zabeli Plakiqit (Plakiq's grove). The Maketa quarter is also often called the Plakiqis' quarter.

Another such old Albanian anthroponym would be the Bujan quarter, also in Llazica. It is also preserved in local microtoponyms, and traces of this anthroponym can be found in early sources, such as the Dečani chrysobulls, in which it is recorded in the village of Qabiq (also in Llapusha and close to Llazica) as the name of a local inhabitant. Progon is another old yet characteristically Albanian anthroponym preserved in a variety of microtoponyms in the area of Kijeva in Llapusha, indicating that in the past there were people in this region who were called Progon. Other notable old Albanian anthroponyms from Llapusha that can be found in both medieval archival sources and local microtoponymy include Bil/Bile, Bic, Likë/Like and Kil.

The most prominent and frequent old Albanian anthroponym of Llapusha in the Middle Ages is Bal/Bale. This anthroponym was also used for large, widespread and well-known Albanian brotherhoods in Llapusha, who founded and gave their name to numerous quarters and villages such as Balinca in the municipality of Malisheva. Microtoponyms surrounding this village contain traces of the anthroponym, such as Prroni i Kronit Balës, Dushet e Balës, Kroni Balës, Bunari Balës and more, and one of the quarters of Balinca is called Balaj. In Llapusha, each of the villages of Sferrka e Gashit (Klina), Gllavera/Gllareva (Klina), Rigjeva (Klina) and Carralluka (Malisheva) also have a quarter called Balaj, and in villages where there is no Balaj quarter, there are still many microtoponyms with traces of the anthroponym Bale. In 1455, an inhabitant of Qabiq in Llapushe was recorded with the name Baliq, and a local microtoponym is called Kroni Bal Dushit. In Gllareva, an author by the name of G. Elezović mentioned an inhabitant by the name of Bale in 1796, and among other things, he pointed out that it is a name of the 14th century. Elezović also mentioned the name Balia in 1779 as the surname of an Albanian family in the village of Marina of Drenica, deriving it from the name Bale, which according to him was no longer used.

=== 20th century ===
Prior to the Yugoslav colonization of Kosovo, Llapusha was inhabited predominantly by Albanians. As such, it was among the key territories targeted by colonization policies aimed at reducing the Albanian population and breaking the national homogeneity of areas such as Drenica, Llapi, parts of the Dukagjin Plain, and other regions of Kosovo.

In the villages of the municipality of Malisheva that are traditionally associated with Llapusha, the number of Serbo-Montenegrin families settled as colonists are as follows: Banja (18 families), Bellanica (14 families), Bubaveci (14 families), Bubli (11 families), Carralluka (22 families), Damaneku (10 families), Dragobili (25 families), Jançishta (1 family), Kijeva/Kjeva (9 families), Lashkadrenoci (47 families), Lladroviqi/Bardhi (20 families), Llazica (42 families), Lubizhda/Lumnishta (23 families), Malisheva (20 families), Millanoviqi/Shkoza (4 families), Mirusha (12 families), Mleçani/Mleqani (26 families), Pagarusha (3 families), Panorci (25 families), Plloçica (9 families), Seniku (8 families), Shkarashniku (9 families), Tërpeza (23 families), Turjaka (8 families) and Vermica/Verrmica (9 families). The village of Garaqeva was refounded in 1935 as a Slavic colony, where 12 families with 50 members were settled. In the locality of Tërpeza-Arllati, 19 colonist families were settled between 1936-1938. In the locality of Panorc–Bubël, 31 colonist families with 128 members were settled. In the locality of Mleçan-Plloçicë, 20 colonist families with 80 members were settled in-between 1936-1938. Therefore, there were 501 Serbo-Montenegrin colonist families in total that were settled in the settlements of Llapusha during this time in the municipality of Malisheva.

In the villages of the municipality of Klina that are traditionally associated with Llapusha, the number of Serbo-Montenegrin families settled as colonists are as follows: Biça/Binxha (17 families), Dollci (2 families), Gllareva (13 families), Dresnik/Dërsnik (3 families), Ceraviku/Caraviku (8 families), Çabiq/Qabiq (4 families), Gremniku (4 families), Gjyrgjeviku i Madh (7 families), Gjyrgjeviku i Vogël (28 families), Jashanica (73 families), Kërnica (24 families), Pograxha (7 families), Qypeva (5 families), Ujmiri (14 families), Volljaka (6 families) and Zabërgja (1 family). In the locality of Jashanicë-Resnik, an additional 52 colonist families with 235 people were settled in-between the years 1932-1937. In total, 268 Serbo-Montenegrin colonist families were settled in the settlements of Llapusha during this time in the municipality of Klina.

In the villages of the municipality of Suhareka that are traditionally associated with Llapusha, the number of Serbo-Montenegrin families settled as colonists are as follows: Duhla (30 families), Javori (3 families) and Semetishti (7 families). In total, 40 Serbo-Montenegrin colonist families were settled in the settlements of Llapusha during this time in the municipality of Suhareka. Meanwhile, of the villages in the municipality of Rahovec that are traditionally associated with Llapusha, only Mrasori is recorded as having 3 families of Serbo-Montenegrin colonists.

== Sources ==
- Marković, Jovan Đ. (1967). Geografske oblasti Socijalističke Federativne Republike Jugoslavije. Zavod za izdavanje udžbenika Socijalističke Republike Srbije.
- Bukumirić, Mileta (1981). Ономастика дела Прекорупља омеђеног рекама Мирушом, Белим Дримом и Клином. САНУ.
- Bukumirić, Mileta (1982). Ономастика Прекорупља, 2. део. САНУ.
- Smirnov, S.; Bošković, Đ. (1934). Arheološke beleške iz Metohije i Prekoruplja.
- Bakić, Radovan (1973). Izbor najpovolnijeg modela krupne saobračajne infrastrukture za razvoj Drenice i Prekoruplja.
- Jašović, Golub M. (2016). "Mikrotoponimija sela Berkova u Prekoruplju". Zbornik Radova Filozofskog Fakulteta u Prištini. 46 (1): 13–25. doi:10.5937/zrffp46-10798.
- Radovanović, Milovan (2008). Kosovo i Metohija: antropogeografske, istorijskogeografske, demografske i geopolitičke osnove. Službeni Glasnik. ISBN 9788675497806.
