= Klina (river) =

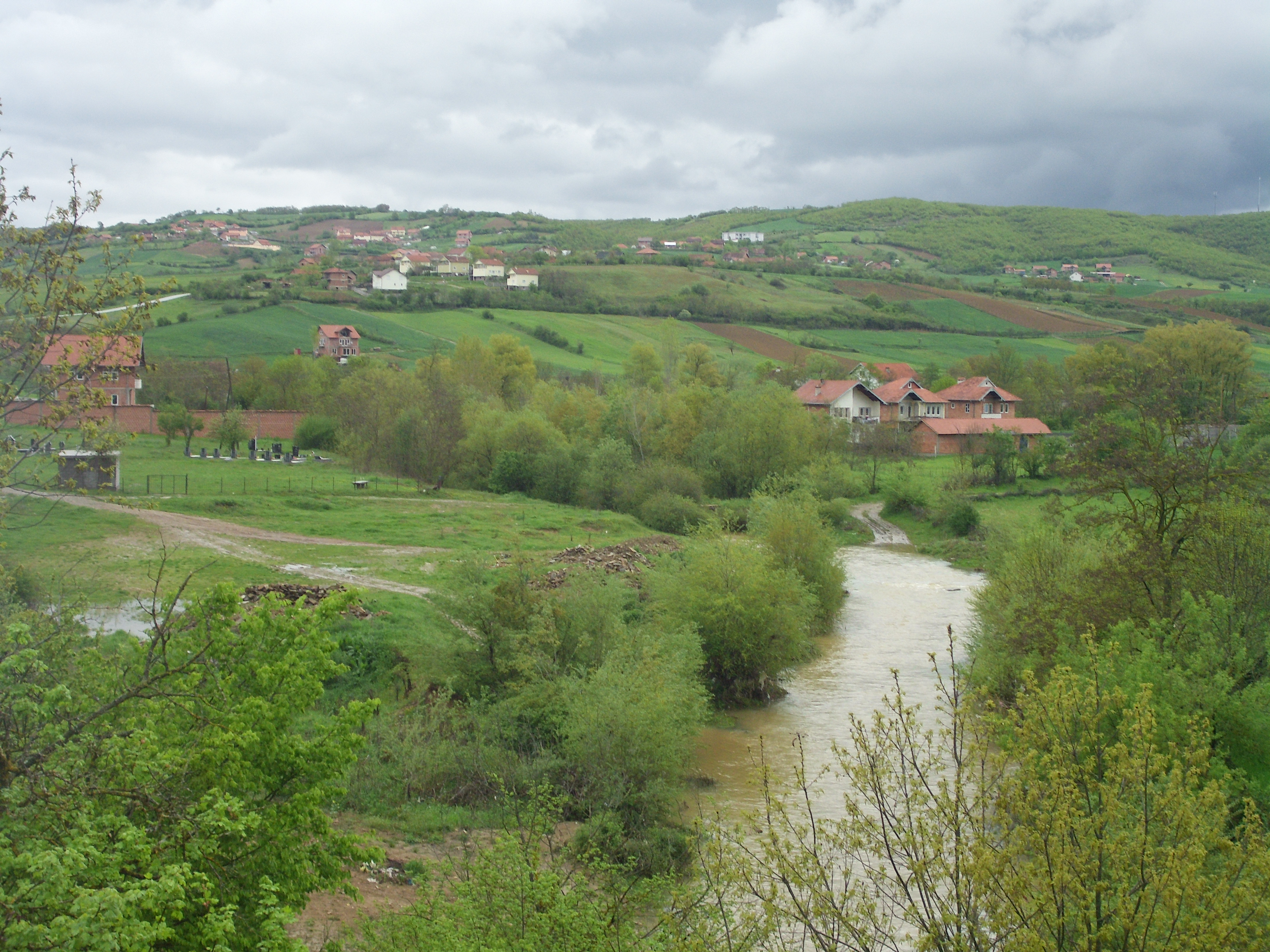
- The Klina river at the eastern end of Klina city

Location
- Country: Kosovo

Physical characteristics
- Source
  - location: Suva Planina mountain, south of Lake Gazivode
- Mouth
  - location: White Drin, near Klina
  - coordinates: 42.6114°N 20.5683°E
- Length: 62 km (39 mi)
- Basin size: 393 km^{2} (152 sq mi)

Basin features
- Progression: White Drin→ Drin→ Adriatic Sea

The Klina (Albanian: Klina; Serbian Cyrillic: Клина) is a river in Kosovo, a 62 km (39 mi) long left tributary to the White Drin. It flows entirely within Kosovo.

The Klina originates from the northeastern slopes of the Suva Planina mountain, south of the artificial Lake Gazivode on the Ibar river, under the Rudopolje peak. In the initial section of the course, the Klina curves a lot, first flows east (at the village of Kaldura), turns south (at Jabuka), east again (at Crepulja) and southeast (at Gornji Strmac).

As it flows parallel to the Ibar and Sitnica rivers, it passes next to the medieval ruins of Perkovac town and the village of Gornja Klina, reaching the regional center of Skenderaj, the village of Llaushë and the monastery of Devič, where the Klina turns southwest, marking the northern border of the Drenica region.

Between the villages of Tušilje and Ovčarevo, the Klina receives from the right its major tributary, the Move. At Dobra Voda, the river turns sharply to the west entering the Metohija (Dukagjini) region. From this point, the river valley is also a route for the Prishtina-Pejë (Priština-Peja) section of the Transbalkanic railway. After the village of Podrgađe, the river reaches the town of Klina and soon after, empties into the White Drin.

The river is rich in hydro electrical potential, but this resource is not used. The Klina belongs to the Adriatic Sea drainage basin (draining itself 393 km^{2}) and it is not navigable.
