= Mirusha Park =

Regional park in Kosovo

- IUCN category V (protected landscape/seascape)
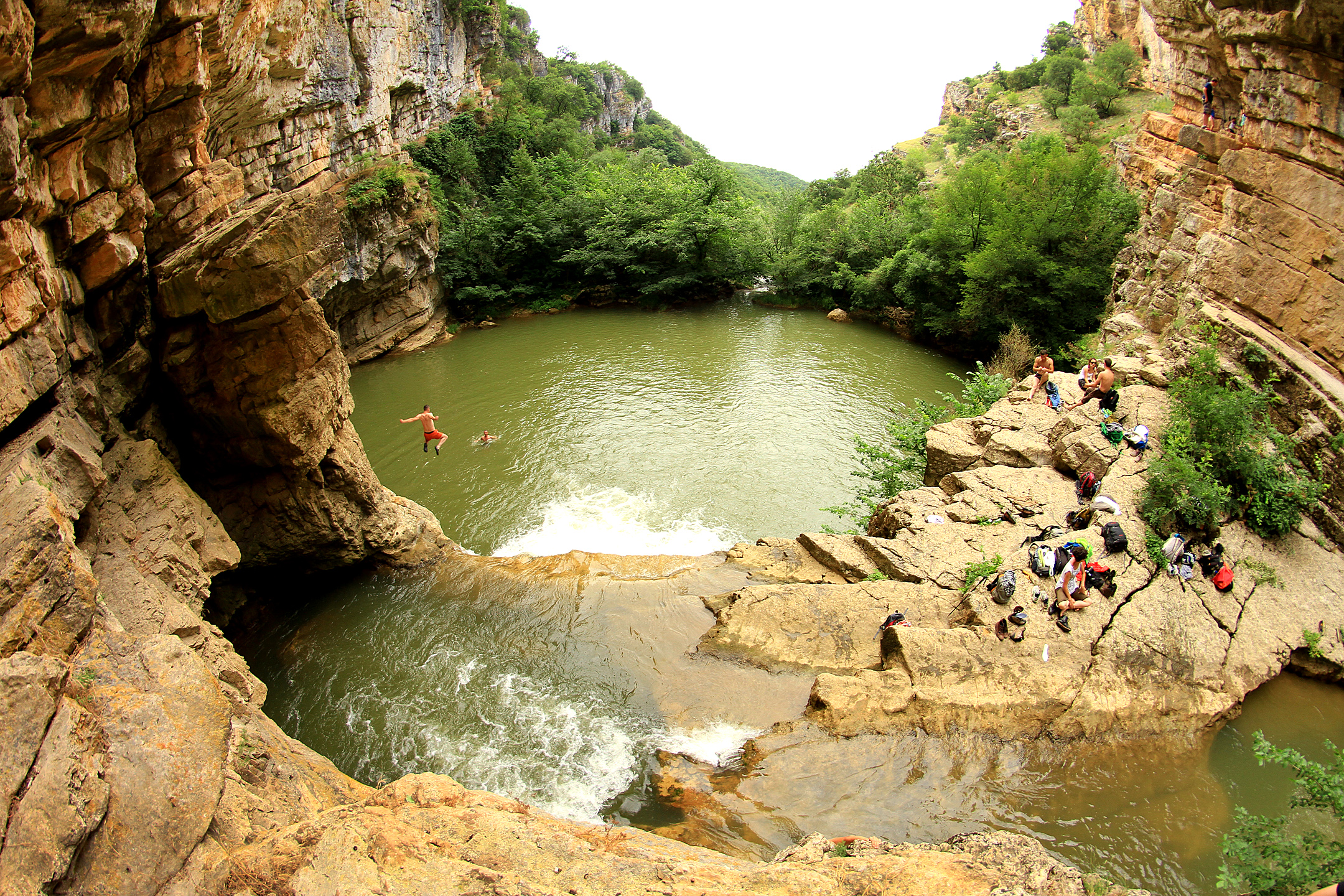
- Mirusha canyon at the fourth lake
- Interactive map of Mirusha Park
- Location: Kosovo
- Coordinates: 42°31′26″N 20°34′59″E
- Area: 55,580.70 hectares (214.5983 mi^{2})
- Established: 1982

Mirusha Park (Albanian: Parku i Mirushës; Serbian: Парк Мируша, romanized: Park Miruša) is a regional park located in the central part of Kosovo on the eastern side of the Dukagjin Plain.

The area was put under protection in 1975 as a special nature reserve, with an area of 19,021.55 hectares (73.4426 mi^{2}) by a decision of the municipality of Rahovec and Klina.

Due to its geoheritage values, specific landscapes, as well as high plant diversity, in 1982 it was declared a regional park in the fifth category (Protected Landscape) according to IUCN, with an area of 55,580.70 hectares (214.5983 mi^{2}), stretching on three municipalities: Klina, Malisheva and Rahovec.

One year later, in 1983, due to hydrological, geomorphological and landscape values, the water flow of river Mirusha has also been put under protection in the third category (Natural Monument) according to IUCN. Its area consist of 1,197.29 hectares (4.6228 mi^{2}) and belongs to Rahovec and Klina municipalities.

== Features ==
Mirusha Park is known for its canyon in which flows the Mirusha River that creates a series of karst lakes and waterfalls arranged one after another in cascades. Due to its geological structure, which consists of ultrabasic rocks and volcanic-sedimentary formations (diabase chert) of Jurassic age and the carbonates from the lower and upper Cretaceous, Mirusha River has created a 200-metre-deep (660 ft) canyon.

At certain points along the canyon lie small lakes, connected to each other by waterfalls, high up to 21 metres (69 ft). There are located in total of 12 waterfalls and 16 lakes. They vary in shape and size according to their position, and the structure and lithological composition of the limestone blocks. The canyon is at its widest at the final lake, while the narrowest part is in the area of the fourth lake, where it is also deepest, between cliffs 200 metres (660 ft) high.

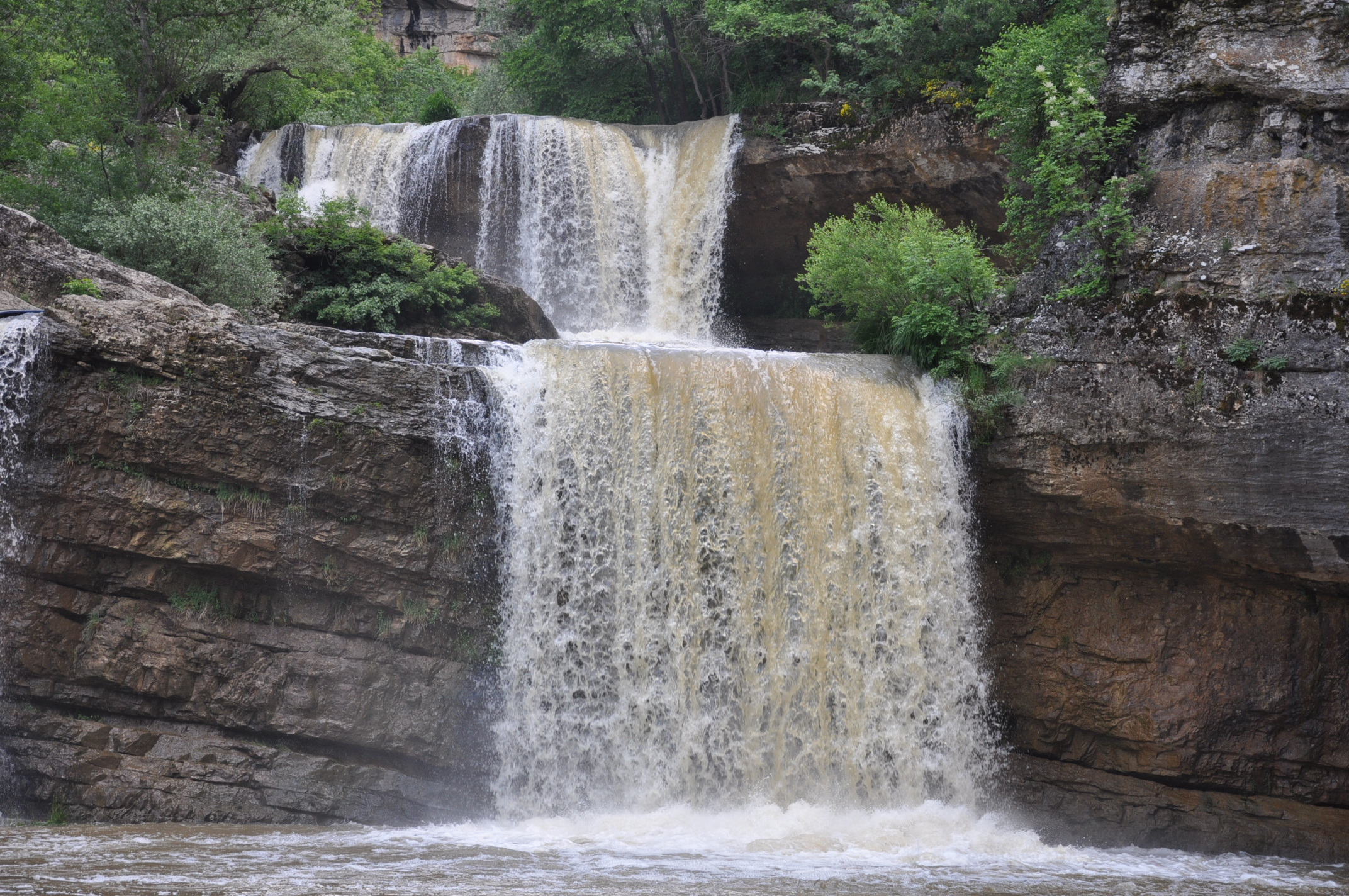
Mirusha waterfalls monument of nature

Rare natural geological and geomorphological features also create interesting motives for the landscape of the park, especially the specific geological form of the terrain, caves, cracks, and other rocky phenomena, which are created as a result of the geological past, the effects of erosion, water, and other exogenous factors.

As a result of a mild continental climate influenced by the Mediterranean, a very rich flora and fauna have been created. The regional park area is home to many endemic and stenoendemic species.

== Location ==
Mirusha Park is one of the most beautiful and most interesting areas of nature in Kosovo, which lies in the central part of the country, in the territory of the municipalities of Klina, Malisheva, and Orahovac.

The nature park is located in the south of the Gremnik mountains, on both sides of the Mirusha River, from the beginning of the canyon up to the discharge in the White Drin River, around 2 kilometres (1.2 mi) from the villages of Dush, Grapc, and Llapqeva and the Hill of Dushi.

In the western part of the park, the national road Klina - Gjakova (M9.1). Parallel to this road lies the railway Peja -Prizren. Around 8 kilometres (5.0 mi) to the north passes the national road Pristina - Peja. Distance from the capital of Kosovo - Pristina is 65 kilometres (40 mi).

== Geography ==
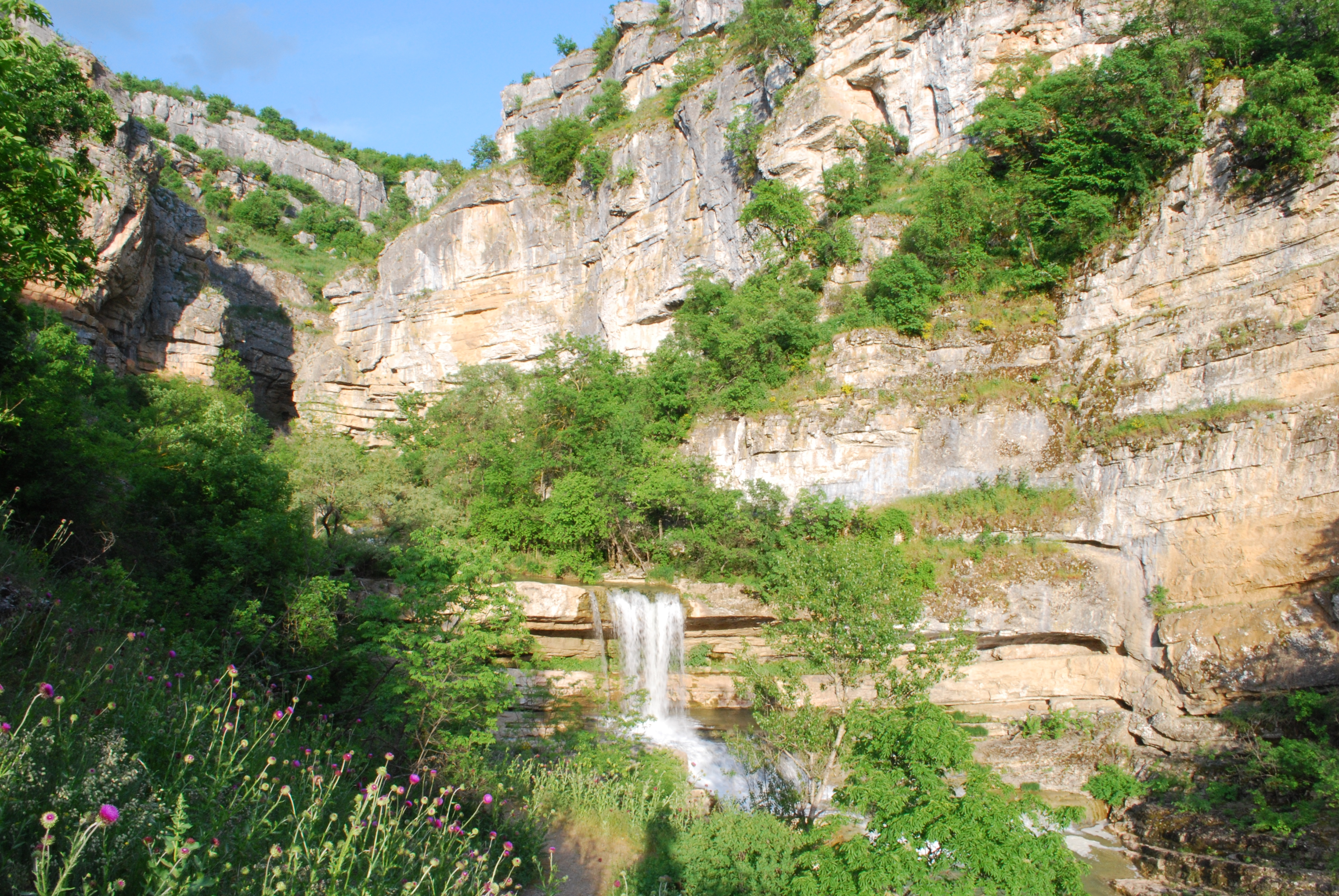
Mirusha Canyon

The nature regional park of Mirusha covers 555.80 hectares (1,373.4 acres) throughout Klina, Malisheva and Rahovec municipalities on the eastern side of the Dukagjini Plain, central Kosovo. The elevation typically ranges from 340 to 600 metres (1,120 to 1,970 ft) above sea level. The geodiversity of the Mirusha river basin represents important heritage components linked to geology, geomorphology, and hydrology, important for science, education, and tourist use.

=== Geology ===
The geological structure of the park consists of ultra basic rocks and volcanic-sedimentary formations (diabase chert) of Jurassic Era and the carbonates from the lower and upper Cretaceous. The geological structure of Mirusha canyon mainly compose Mesozoic limestone cliffs with tendency to drop in the direction of the water flow. Extension of these rocks in the direction northwest–southeast, and dropping to the southeast, presents a geological extension of rocks.

Quaternary sediments are represented by humus, sand humus, clay humus and alevrol. River terraces of Mirusha valley are mainly constructed from pieces of rounded quartzite, Palaeozoic Slate, Cretaceous limestone, sandstone, serpentinite, diabase, and Gabrovo. These fluvial terraces are of diluvial origin.

Alluvium is common on both sides of the river Mirusha. In general, there is not a wide spread in the area of Alluvium.

Deluvionet is more common in the wide part of the region. These sediments are formed under natural conditions, passing through sedimentary material, from a mobile state or transferred to the stationary state. Quaternary sediments are in contact with upper Cretaceous limestone. Also, in the eastern and western part these sediments are in contact with the metasediment belt. Quaternary area is represented by lake sediments, silt-clay, gravel, sand, and silt.

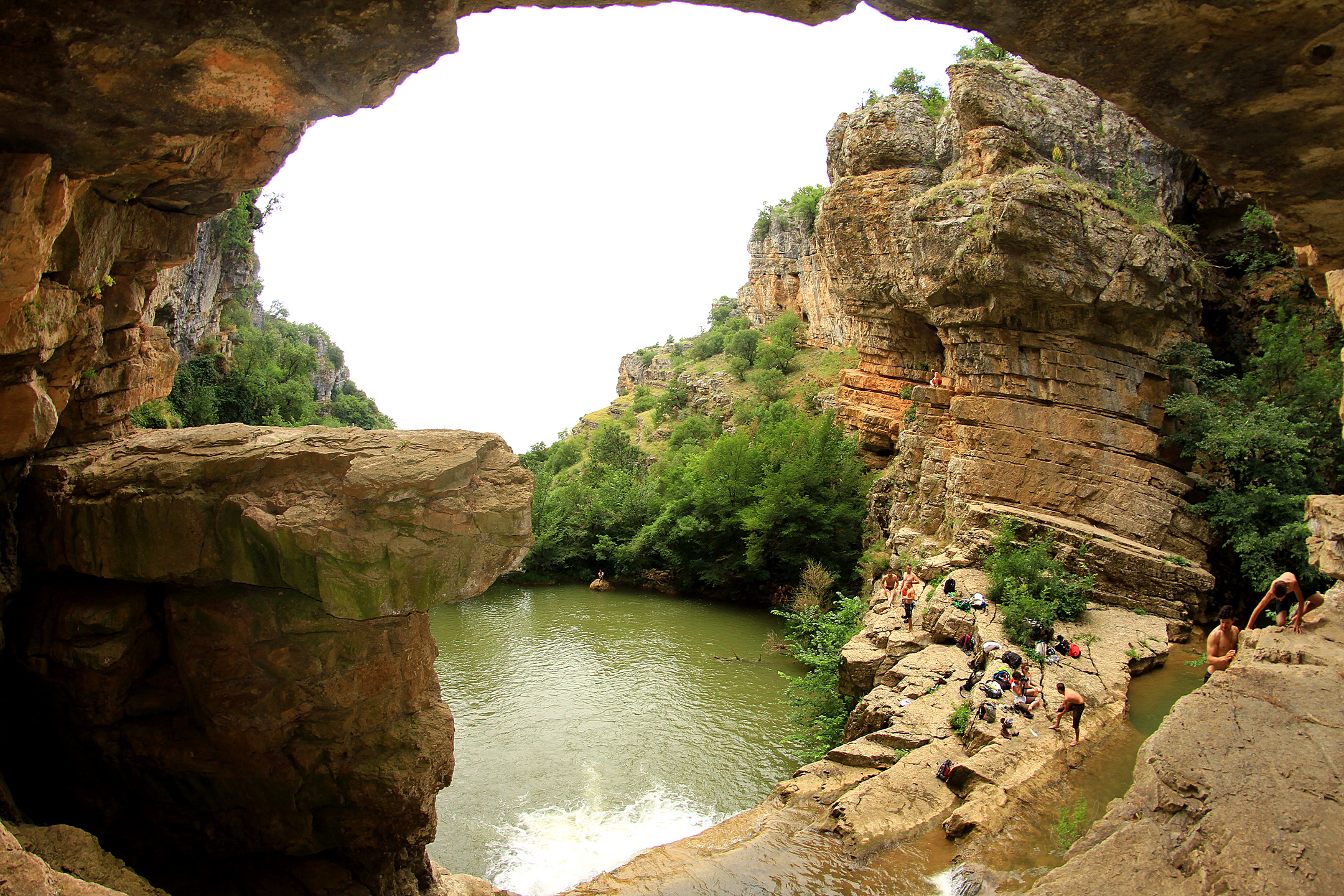
Mirusha high cliffs

Pliocene sediments also stretch within the park area. In most part they are in erosion contact with upper Cretaceous limestone cliffs. These limestones are massive and contain numerous traces of gastropods and lie through the Senon limestone floor. Also, in the Pliocene, several layers of coal appeared.

Lower Cretaceous is represented by limestone plaque of different colors and is more common in the western part.

Sedimentary volcanogenic series spread out in the south-western region. According to the geological map, there are two areas of widespread occurrence: the northern and southern areas. In the Northern area, there are spread flysch, conglomeratic sand, and marly formations, while in south area, there are spread shale clay, sandstone, and siliceous.

The area has a large geoheritage value and a great tourism potential. The most important geoheritage values are the canyon itself with lakes, waterfalls, caves (Dushi cave, Ponorci cave, Zatriqi cave, cave of Azem Galica, etc.), karst forms (ponds, scribes, karsts valleys, etc.) as well as decorative stones, bauxite, fossils, thermal spring water, and a very characteristic appearance of the rocks. These values are important for science, education, as well as for tourist use.

==== Caves ====
In Mirusha canyon are created special relief forms: deepening, caves, rocky cuts, material deposits, lakes, etc. Besides the waterfalls and lakes, characteristic forms are also caves with different shapes and sizes. Some of the most interesting caves are the Great Church and Small Church caves, the cave in the tenth lake, the cave in the ninth lake, which is divided into two channels (the left and right channels), the cave behind the ninth lake, and the cave of Dush, etc.

Great Church Cave stretches at the last lake on the right side of the river flow. This cave is located in a characteristic relief in the wall form. The cave, in its geological past, has been a source of underground waters. It has a 4-metre-wide (13 ft) and 12-metre-high (39 ft) entrance and has a total length of 40 metres (130 ft). At the end of the cave, there are a few stalactites, stalagmites, and karst pillars.

Small Church Cave has small size with a length of 4 metres (13 ft). The entrance of the cave is 1.4 metres (4 ft 7 in) wide, which from the bottom narrows further. The end of the cave is horizontal and filled with mud. From the entrance to the Great Church cave, the channel goes in the southeast direction, where after 4 metres (13 ft) a limestone rock appears in various forms and with cuts, through which it is possible to gain access to the cave of the small church.

The cave in the tenth lake stretches under the waterfall with a width of 9 metres (30 ft), a length of 16 metres (52 ft), and water 3 metres (9.8 ft) deep, depending on the level of the lake. The entrance of the cave is 5 metres (16 ft) wide and 3 metres (9.8 ft) high. The karst cave is formed by the erosive forces of the water of the Mirusha River.

The cave in the ninth lake consists of two channels: the right and the left one. The entrance to this cave is possible only by passing under the waters of the ninth lake. Left channel has an entrance of arch shape with a width of 3 metres (9.8 ft) and a height of 6 metres (20 ft), and it is 43 metres (141 ft) long. Right channel has arc entrance 6 metres (20 ft) wide and 7 metres (23 ft) high.

Karst caves – in the early geological past, these caves were an underground water resource in the river Mirusha.

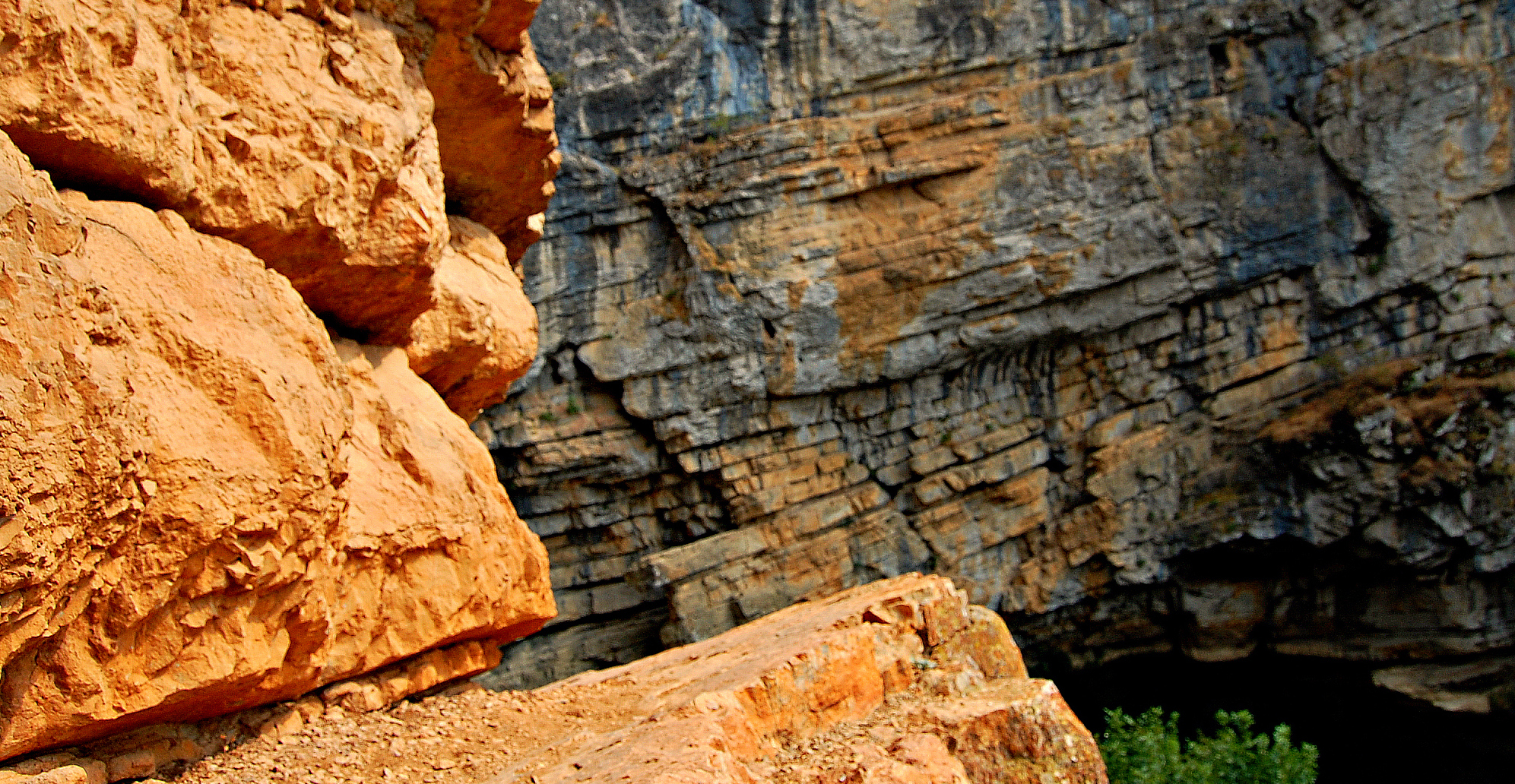
Canyon of Mirusha

The Great cave is situated along ninth lake. Entering the cave is achieved only by passing under the water of the Mirusha channel. The cave is still under the influence of river erosion. In the entire 44 metres (144 ft) length of the cave, its bottom is filled with 5–6 metres (16–20 ft) of water. The entrance has a width up to 9 metres (30 ft), and a height of 5 metres (16 ft). The cave is formed at the end of the valley of the Dush village, which ranges from North to South towards the canyon. The cave can be reached via the Dush -Ponorc road near the beginning of the canyon.

The Dushi cave is the most interesting and most important regarding the natural values in the whole region of Mirusha Park. The passable length of the cave is 180 metres (590 ft). It should be mentioned also that the cave has two secondary channels of 40 metres (130 ft), so with secondary channels the total length of the cave is 260 metres (850 ft). The entrance of the cave is quite impressive with a width of 10 metres (33 ft) and a height of 15 metres (49 ft). Inside the cave up to the 72nd meter, in the northern direction extends the channel with about 40 metres (130 ft) length, while in the south-east direction the cave is passable through the meandering canal up to 180th meter. At the 180th meter, the secondary channel connects with the main channel of the cave and the other secondary channel towards the south-west. Here, the cave also ends in the form of an "S" and is not passable. Inside the cave, there are six small lakes created during the erosive activity and waterfalls up to 2–5 metres (6.6–16.4 ft) high. It is rich in stalactites, stalagmites and columns of different shapes and sizes, with large numbers of bats living inside (Rhinolophus ferrumequinum, Rh. blasii, Eptesicus serotinus).

=== Hydrology ===
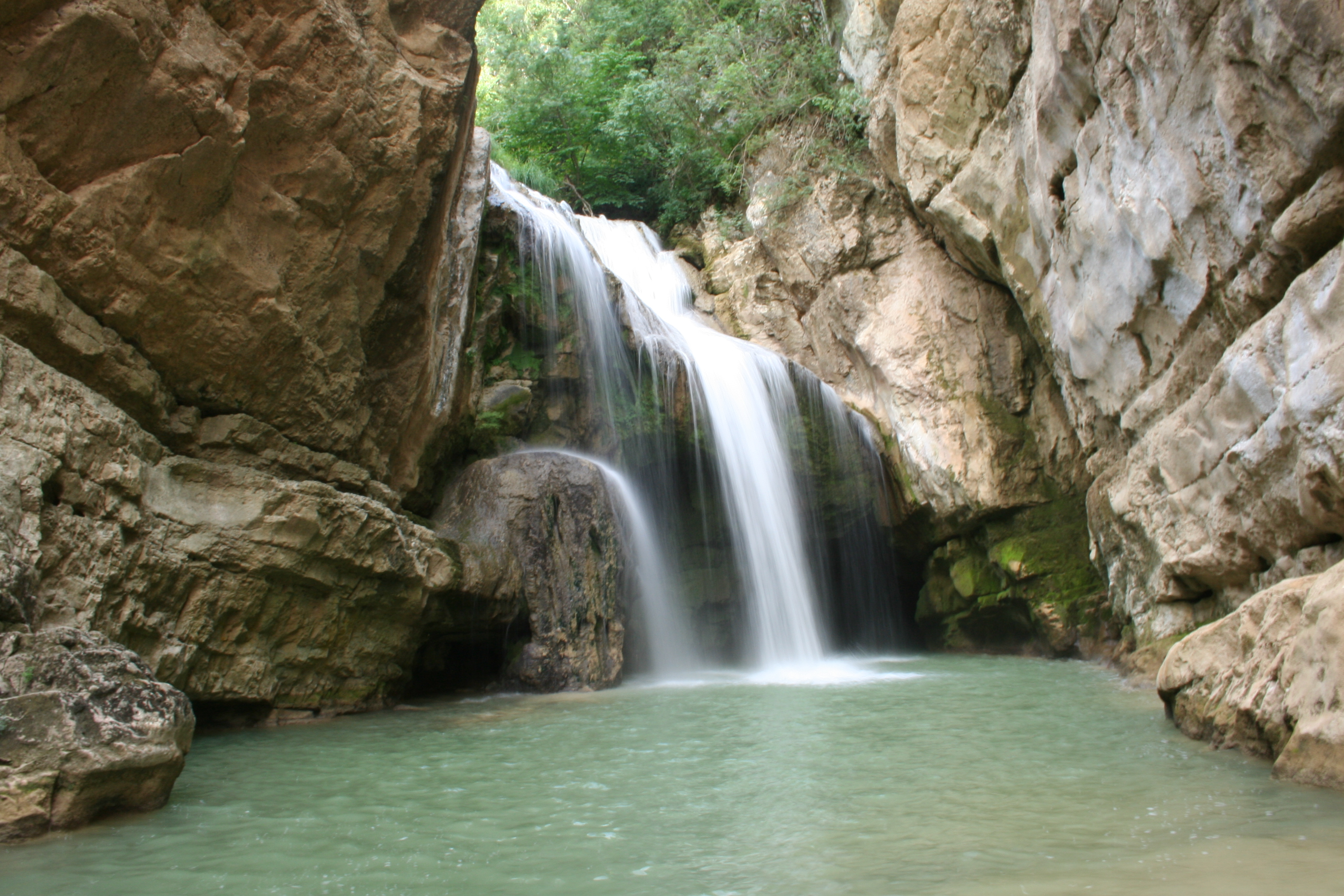
Mirusha River

In Mirusha Park flows the river Mirusha, from which the park took its name. Due to hydrological, geomorphologic, and landscape importance, this river has been put under protection in 1983 in the third category according to IUCN.

The source of the river Mirusha is situated in the west of the Caraleva mountains. It forms the left branch of the White Drin River with a length 37 kilometres (23 mi) with an average altitude of 795–360 metres (2,608–1,181 ft) above sea level. The average flow of Mirusha River is 1.2 m^{3}/s (42 cu ft/s) while the average water level of the river is 0.65 centimetres (0.26 in). The river covers an area of 336.7 square kilometres (130.0 sq mi), around 3.1% of the total land area of Kosovo.

Mirusha River hydrographic network is generally asymmetric, irrespective of rivers, streams, and creeks to the right of the river Mirusha, in front of the left.

The main branches of the Mirusha River are: the river of Biniqëve, "Lugu i Perrockës", "Lugu i Malishevës", Stopanica, the river of Bubavec, and the stream of Kijevo. Most streams, even those that have a large catchment area, dry up in the dry season of the year; they dry in the lower parts of the territory, such as the stream of Kijevo, the brook of Drenoc, and the river of Bubavec.

Most of the area that includes the park is built from the source of limestone rock, which belongs to the porous crack formations, where the rocks are with small flow of underground water. Underground waters in general are not common in the area, but are assumed to be in the depths of limestone and ultrabasic rocks.

At the end of the canyon, after the last lake on the right side near cliffs, is a source of karst water, and 30 metres (98 ft) away is also a source of water that has water all year long.

==== Lakes and waterfalls ====
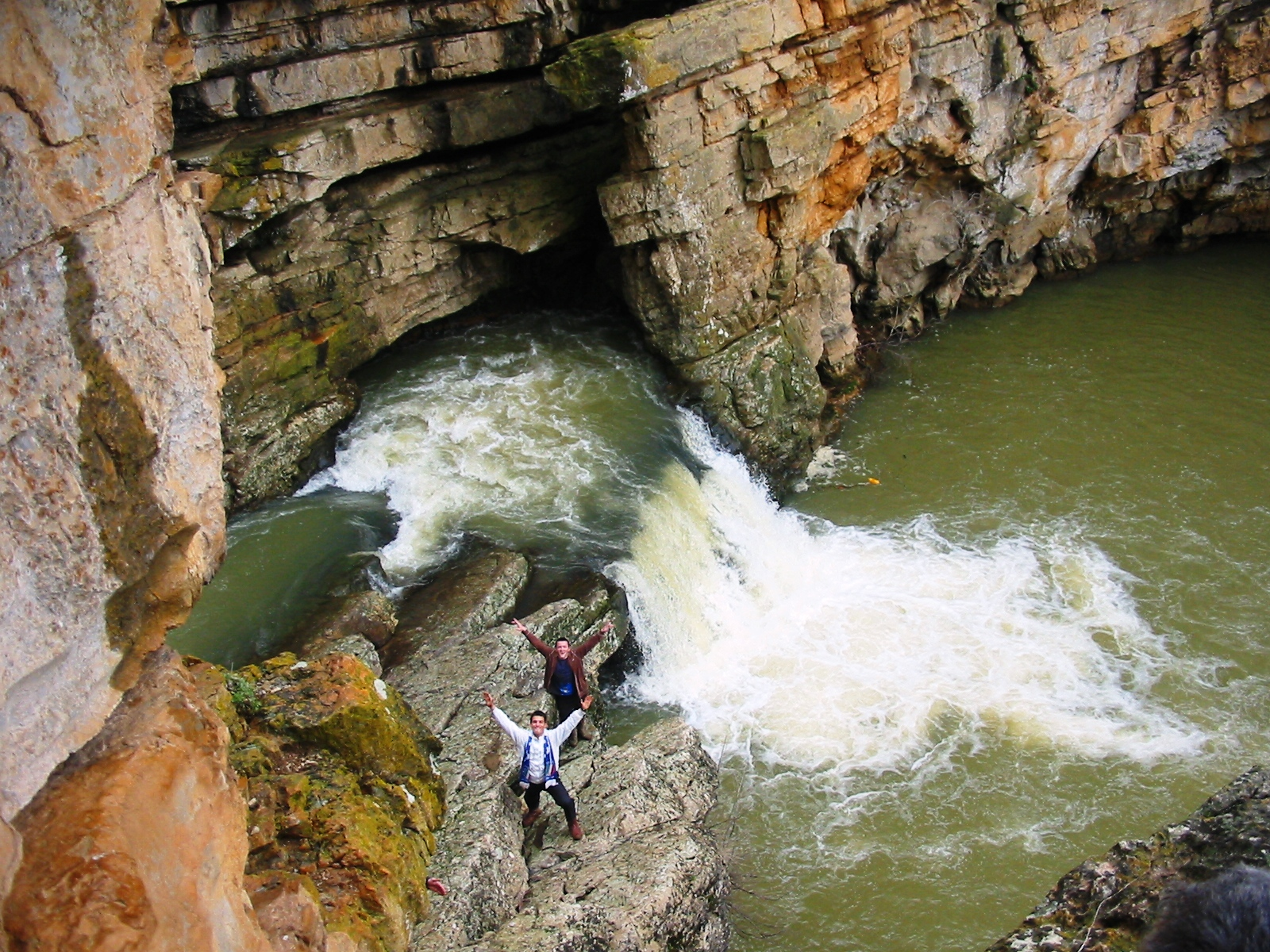
One of the waterfalls in Mirusha Park

The most important and most interesting features of this Mirusha natural phenomenon are the lakes and waterfalls. These natural phenomena are created in the middle and end course of Mirusha River with a length of 650 metres (2,130 ft). In this area are situated 16 lakes and 12 waterfalls of different forms and sizes.

The last lake is the largest in terms of dimensions and is easily accessible to every visitor. It has dimensions of 55 by 45 metres (180 ft × 148 ft), a depth over 5 metres (16 ft) with an area of 2,250 m^{2} (24,200 sq ft). The deepest lake is the 10th lake with a 9 metres (30 ft) depth, while the longest lake is the eighth lake with a length of 56 metres (184 ft), a width of 18.5 metres (61 ft), and depth of 5–6 metres (16–20 ft).

The highest waterfall is between the eighth and ninth lake with a height of 21 metres (69 ft), but the most impressive waterfall is between the 15th and 16th lake with a height of 8 metres (26 ft).

Based on the shape and size of these lakes, they are divided into three groups:

- The upper lakes 1–8
- The medium lakes 9–12 and
- The lower lakes 13–16

The upper lakes in terms of the shape and size are usually small, at the beginning with a small depth 1–3 metres (3.3–9.8 ft), while the eighth lake reaches up to 6.5 metres (21 ft). Waters of the lakes move from one lake to another through straits, thresholds, and deepening that have created waterfalls of different heights. It is characteristic of the upper lakes, the trend of deepening due to the free fall of water, and erosion that cause these drops of water. The width of the upper canyon is small from the first lake, where the water begins to create waterfalls and lakes in 0.50–1 metre (1.6–3.3 ft) river width, which, up to the last lake (the eighth), reaches a maximum width of 3 metres (9.8 ft). Another interesting feature is the sound of waterfalls because this part of the canyon is very narrow.

The medium lakes are created in a short geological period, and due to their composition, erosion has been very powerful and has created various forms, especially those called walls orris. The absolute height is about 100 metres (330 ft) from the 13th lake up to the 8th lake. The terrain is very inconvenient to visit because of the depth and craggy shapes between the lakes. The depths between the 9th and 10th waterfall are 6–9 metres (20–30 ft), while the height of the wall-shaped waterfall between the eighth and ninth lake is 21 metres (69 ft), and between the ninth and tenth lake is 9 m.

The lower lakes of the canyon are characterized by different width 50–60 metres (160–200 ft) between the two sides. The natural beauties of the lower Mirusha canyon are more easily accessible for visitors and are known for the size and depth of the lakes, as well as scenic waterfalls. The largest lakes in the entire canyon are the 13th and the 16th (last) lake, with a depth of 5–7 metres (16–23 ft). After the 13th lake, the waterfall has a height of three meters with a very quick drop of the water that falls into the 14th lake, creating a 14-metre-high (46 ft) waterfall toward the 15th lake. At the 15th lake, with a similar height, the water falls into the 16th lake, where Mirusha canyon ends. The dimensions of the lakes vary from the first up to the 16th, depending on the amount of water and rainfall in the catchment of Mirusha.

Another characteristic of Mirusha Canyon is also the river erosion, where, during the process of the water flow, depending on the composition of the rocks, it erodes, dissolves, and carries erosive material.

== Climate ==
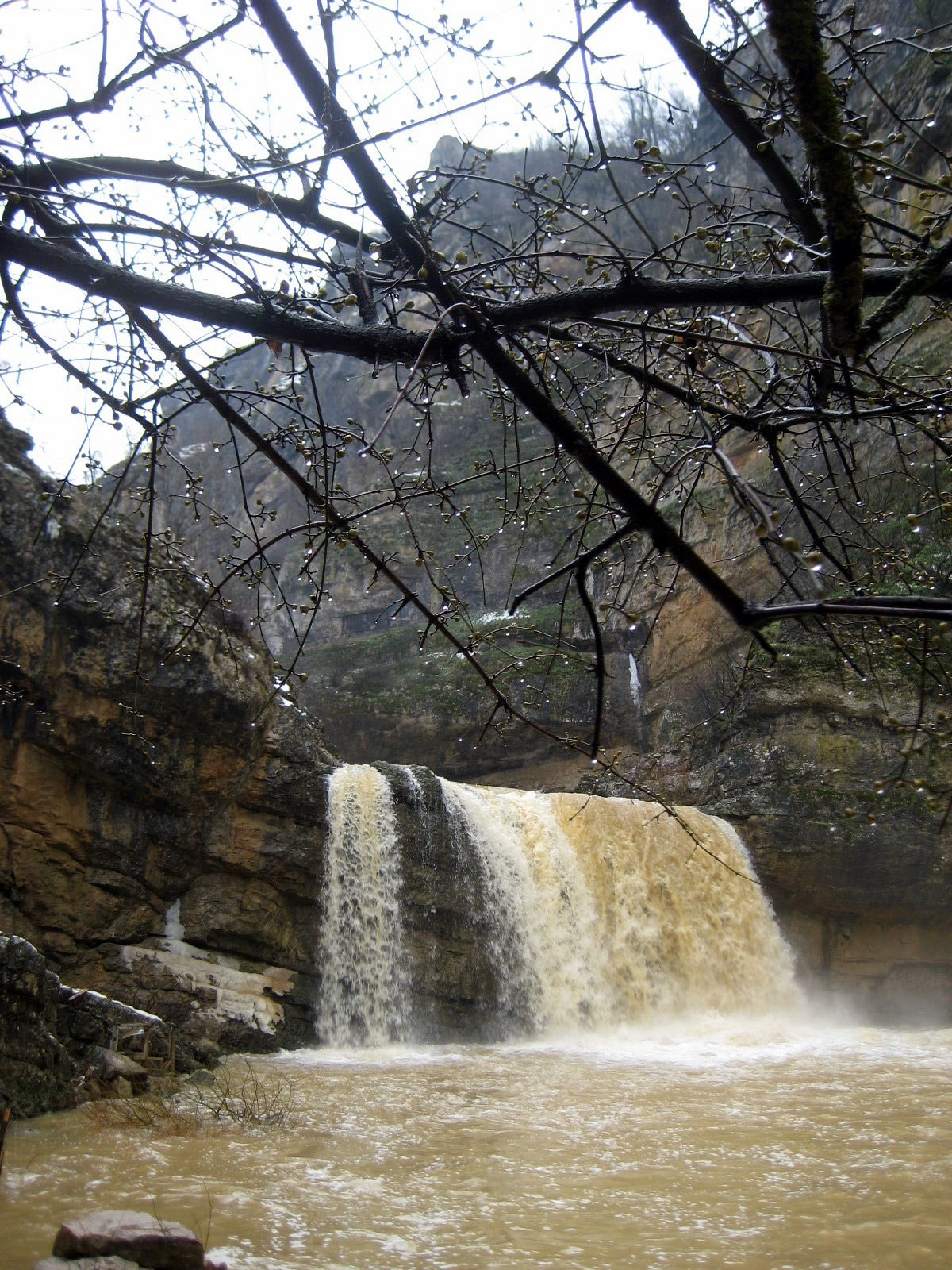
Mirusha Waterfalls in winter

The climate in the area of Mirusha Park is mild continental, influenced by the Mediterranean climate. The area of the Park doesn't have meteorological station but were used climate data from surrounding stations, such as Rahovec (14 km (8.7 mi) airline), Gjakova (20 km (12 mi)) and Peja (28 km (17 mi)).

The average annual air temperature
Months	I	II	III	IV	V	VI	VII	VIII	IX	X	XI	XII
Cº	‐1.2	2.5	5.7	11.1	15.9	19.3	21.4	21.2	17	11.6	7	3.4

The average annual precipitation is 910 mm (35.83 in). The months with the highest rainfall are December (114 mm (4.5 in)) and November (109 mm (4.3 in)), while the minimum in July (51 mm (2.0 in)) and June (54 mm (2.1 in)).

The average annual precipitation
Months	I	II	III	IV	V	VI	VII	VIII	IX	X	XI	XII
mm	90	70	80	59	79	54	51	55	57	92	109	114

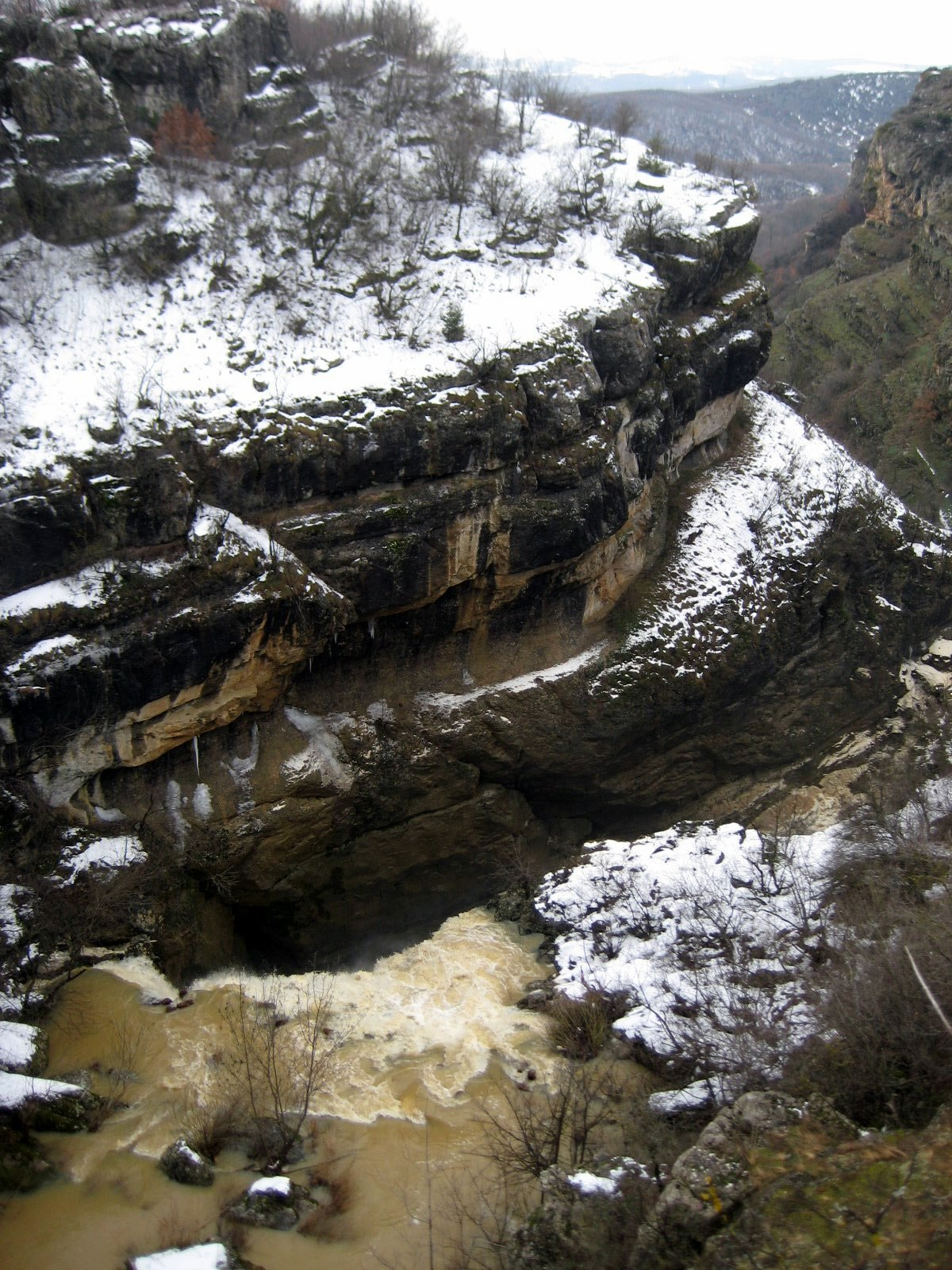
Mirusha canyon in winter

The relative air humidity is 76%. Relative humidity is higher in December, November, and January, while it is lower in June and July. The difference between the highest and the lowest humidity level is 19%.

The relative air humidity
Months	I	II	III	IV	V	VI	VII	VIII	IX	X	XI	XII
%	85	80	76	71	73	71	69	67	71	79	86	86

The annual solar radiation lasts 1,968 hours. The month with the highest isolation is August, with 298 hours and July has 289 hours, while the months with the lowest isolation are December 58 and January 63 hours. The average annual solar radiation is 5 hours. The Summer period (or periods of vegetation from IV to X) has an average of 1,411 hours of sunshine.

The monthly average of solar insolation
Months	I	II	III	IV	V	VI	VII	VIII	IX	X	XI	XII
Hours	63.3	94.2	138.2	173.4	198.1	232.3	289.3	298,3	220	135.8	67.3	57.9

== Biodiversity ==
As a result of a mild continental climate influenced by the Mediterranean, the area is quite rich with species and associations. Besides the climatic elements, the rich biodiversity in the area of Mirusha Park is also poor in industrial development in this region. The park area is home to many endemic and stenoendemic species.

=== Flora ===
In the territory of Mirusha are identified 330 species of vascular flora, without taking into account species of Mosses and Thallophyte. From Thallophyte are identified 44 species of high fungus (Macromycete), where in the wide area of Mirusha are identified 838 taxones, represented by 590 species of vascular flora. A specific feature of the Mirusha territory flora is the presence of 14 plant associations, and 5 of them are to endemic character, whilst the total number of endemic species is 21. Among them, the species Aristolochia merxmuelleri, which is a steno-endemic species and has not been found elsewhere in the world, except in Mirusha.

Examples of steno-endemic species to be found in the park
Aristolochia merxmuelleri
Stipa mayeri

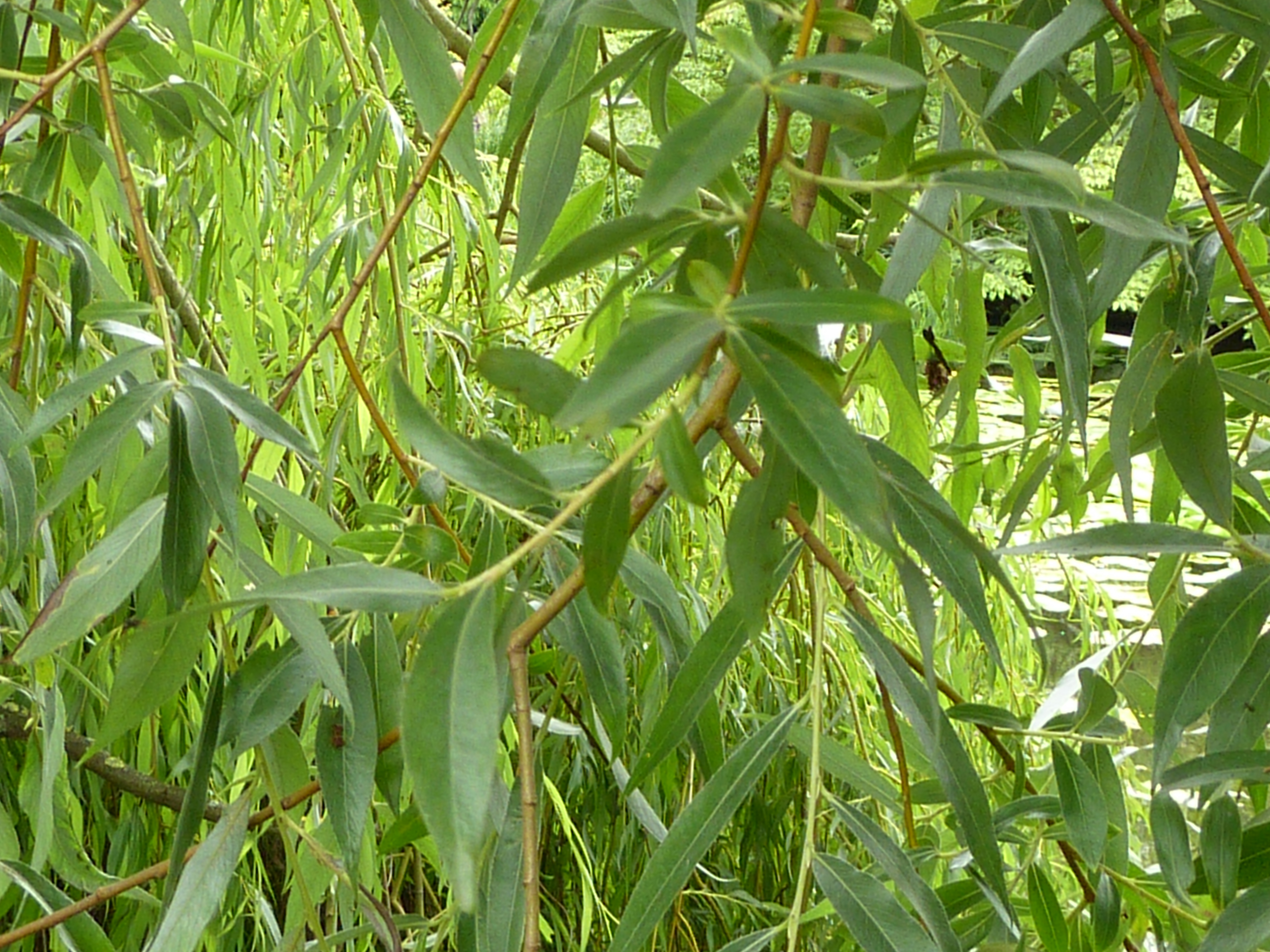
White willow (Salicetum albae fragilis) is very common in the park (symbolic image)

Examples of endemic plants to be found in the park
Genista hassertiana	Aster albanicus	Scutellaria orientalis
Centaurea albertii	Centaurea kosaninii	Sedum serpentini
Forsythia europaea	Fumana bonopartei	Veronica andrasovskyi
Halacsya sendtneri	Knautia macedonica	Armeria rumelica
Linum elegans	Polygala doerfleri	Malus florentina
Potentilla visianii	Sanguisorba albanica	Moltkia doerfleri

The largest part of the area is covered by the association of bungu (Ass. Querrcetum farnetto - cerris scardicum Krasniqi 1968), which is one of the most widespread associations in Kosovo. A characteristic of this region is the presence of the habitats as: white willow (Salicetum albae fragilis), red willow (Salicetum purpurea), black alder (Alnetum glutinosae), oak (Quercetum farnetto cerris scardicum and Quercetum pubescentis‐cerris), juniper (Astero‐Juniperetum oxycedri), Polygala Genistetum hassertianae, Hyperico Euphorbietum glabliflorae, Potentilla-Fumaretum bonopartei, Salvio-Scorsoneretum villosae, Echinario-Convolvuletum althaeoides, Onosmo-Scabietosum fumaroides, Vitici-Tarmaricetum dalmaticae.

=== Fauna ===
Regarding the fauna, this area is very rich with particular kinds of animals, which are related to specific biotopes and belong to the endemic species. In Mirusha area are identified following animal species: boar (Sus scrofa), badger (Meles meles), rabbit (Lepus europaeus), squirrel (Scirius vulgaris), wolf (Canis lupus), wild cat (Felis silvestris), pine marten (Martes martes), maus (Ondatra zibethica), mountainous mous (Apodemus flaviocollis), hedgehog (Erinaceus concolor L.), terrestrial turtle (Testudo sp.), rocky poisonous snake (Vipera ammodytes) etc.

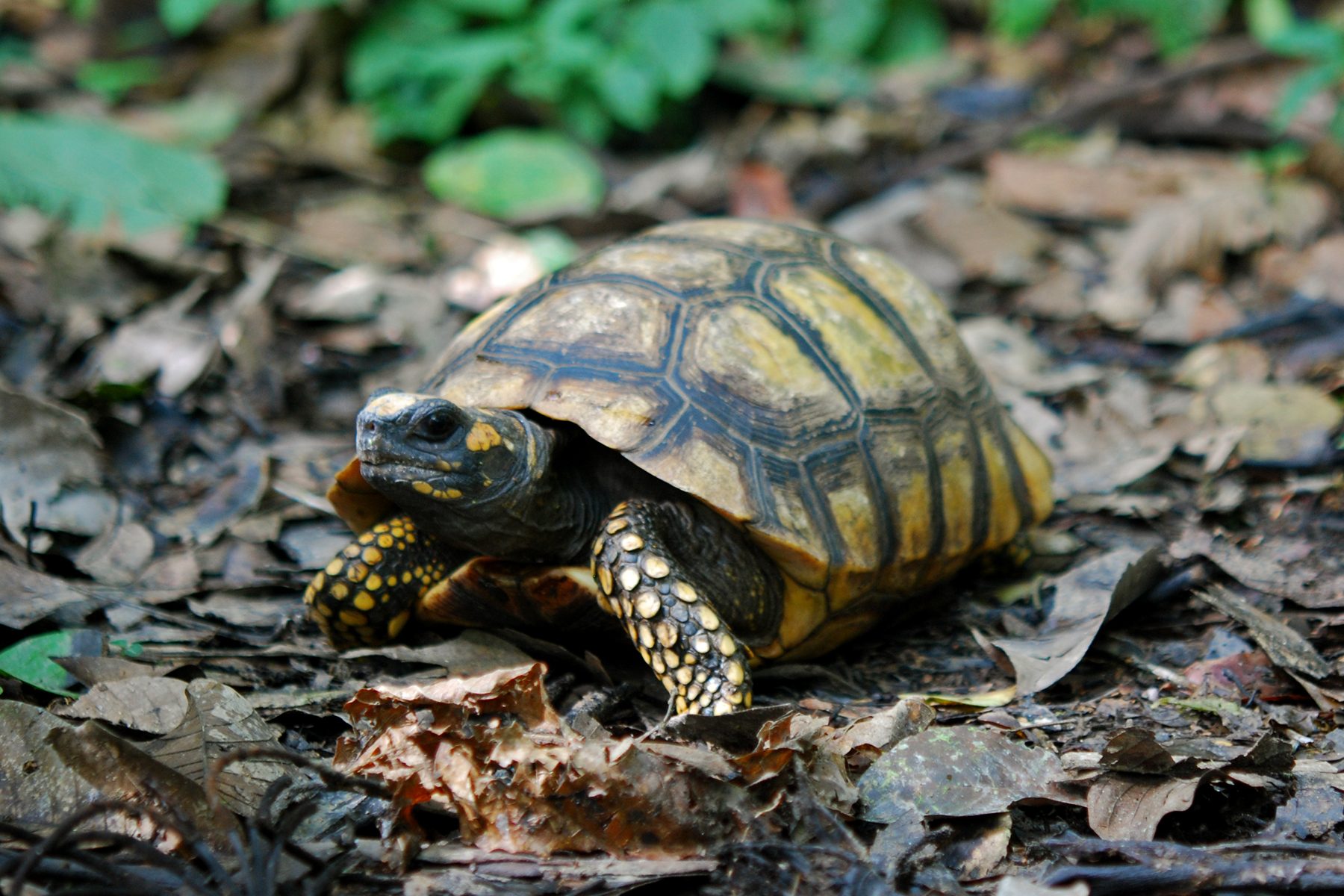
Yellow-footed tortoise Testudo sculpta is very common in the park area (symbolic image)

Examples of animal species to be found in the park
Sus scrofa	Meles meles	Lepus europaeus
Scirius vulgaris	Canis lupus	Felis silvestris
Martes martes	Ondatra zibethica	Apodemus flaviocollis
Erinaceus concolor L.	Testudo sculpta	Vipera ammodytes

The Mirusha River is also in good condition for amphibian and fish species.

== Cultural heritage ==
In Mirusha canyon itself are found caves as: the Great Church, the Small Church, and caves in Spirits. The Great Church and Small Church caves are found in the cliffs of the canyon, in small dimensions and poor in terms of their domestic regulation. However, they represent very interesting objects because it is assumed that Orthodox monks sheltered there during the Ottoman occupation, and for this reason, people called these caves "Churches". In the Small Church cave were found remains of frescoes, while in the Great Church cave were found traces of the altar of the prayers.

According to the law for classification of Special Protected Areas in Kosovo, the Church of the Hermits cave also represents an interesting and important monument. It is located in Uljaricë village, Klina Municipality. Based on the list of monuments/cultural heritage objects with protection status in Kosovo, it is called Uluricë Cave (14th century).

== Tourism ==
Those waterfalls between the lakes, together with the landscape, rocks, and caves around the waterfalls, form a special tourism attraction.

== See also ==
- Mirusha Waterfalls
