= Mirusha waterfalls =

Series of waterfalls in Mirusha Park, Kosovo

Mirusha Waterfalls
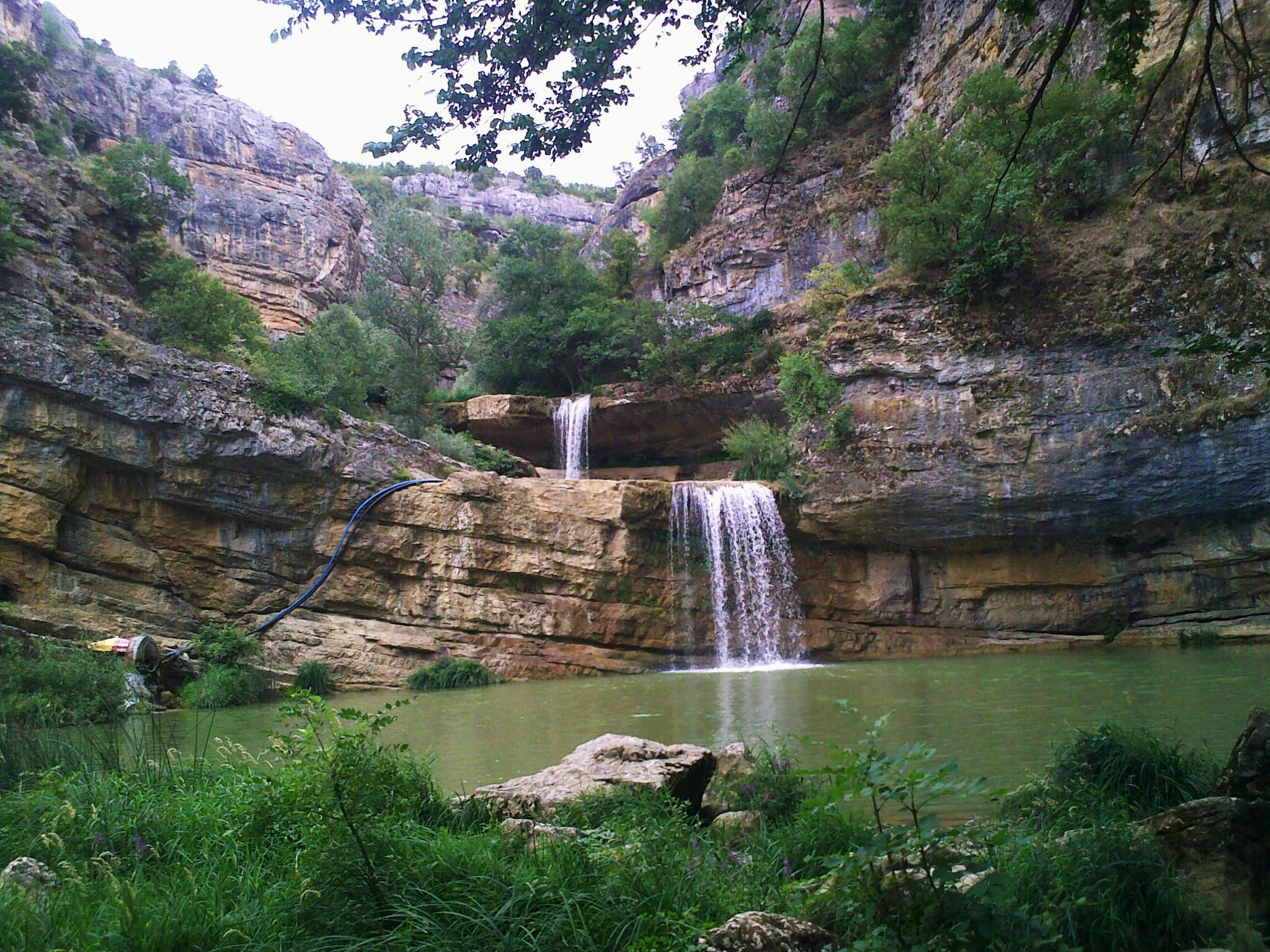
- Mirusha Waterfalls
- Interactive map of Mirusha Waterfalls
- Location: Kosovo
- Coordinates: 42°31′26″N 20°34′59″E
- Type: Multi-step
- Number of drops: 12
- Longest drop: 22 m (72 ft)
- Watercourse: Mirusha River

The Mirusha Waterfalls (Albanian: Ujëvarat e Mirushës; Serbian: Слапови Мируше, romanized: Slapovi Miruše) are a series of waterfalls found in the Mirusha Park, in central Kosovo. The waterfalls have, over time, created canyons and caves, which are famous throughout the country. Mirusha River has carved a 10 kilometres (6 mi) canyon and created 13 lakes with waterfalls between them. The waterfalls are one of the most visited attractions of the area and people often swim there. The walls around the waterfalls are white in colour, whereas the water from the Mirusha River is a dirty brown. The cliffs around some pools are used for high-diving competitions. The waterfall's caves are also popular with visitors. The highest waterfall, between the sixth and seventh lake, is 22 metres (72 ft) high.

== Gallery ==
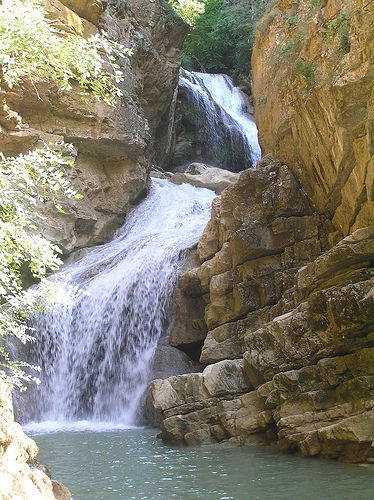
One of the waterfalls

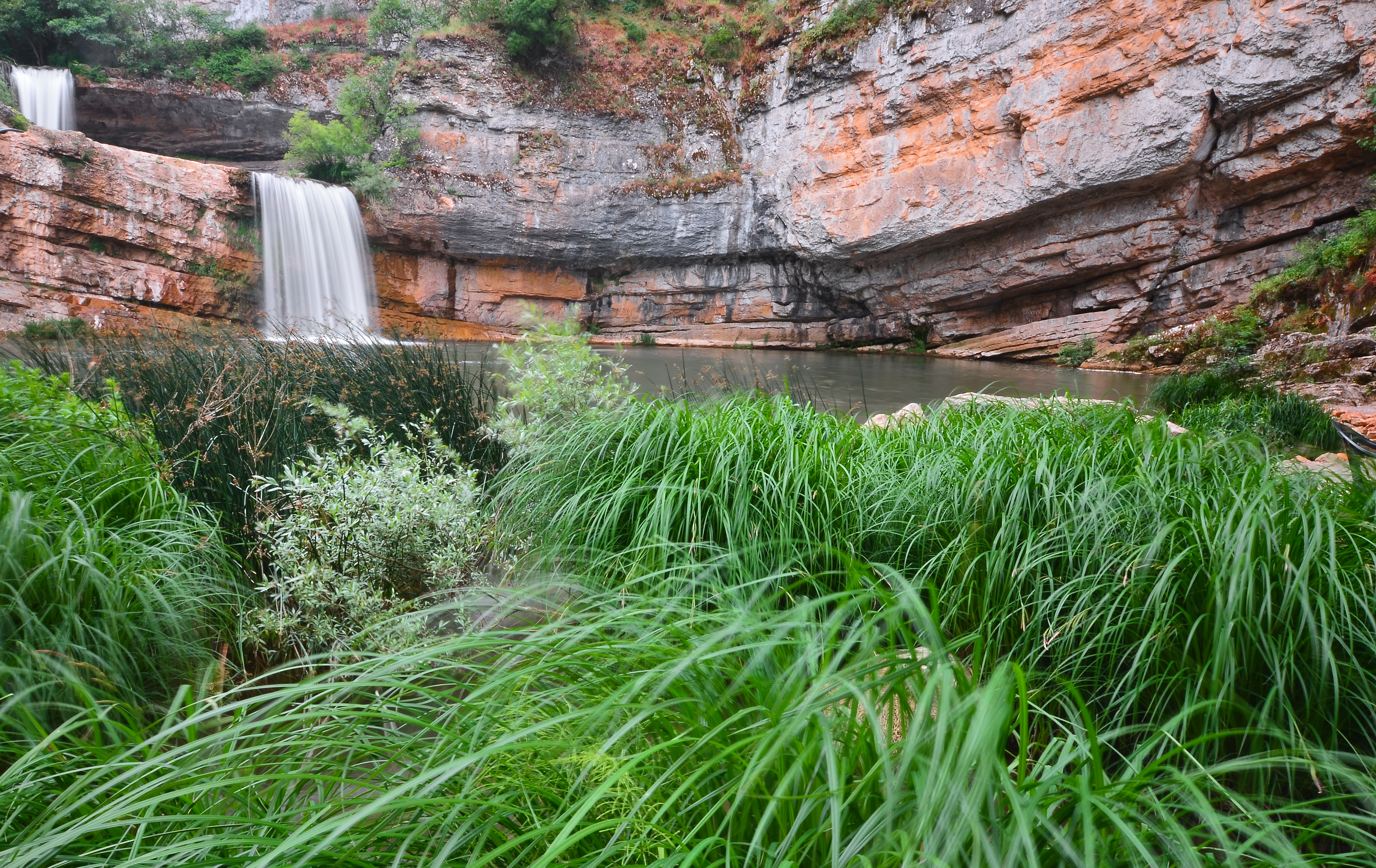

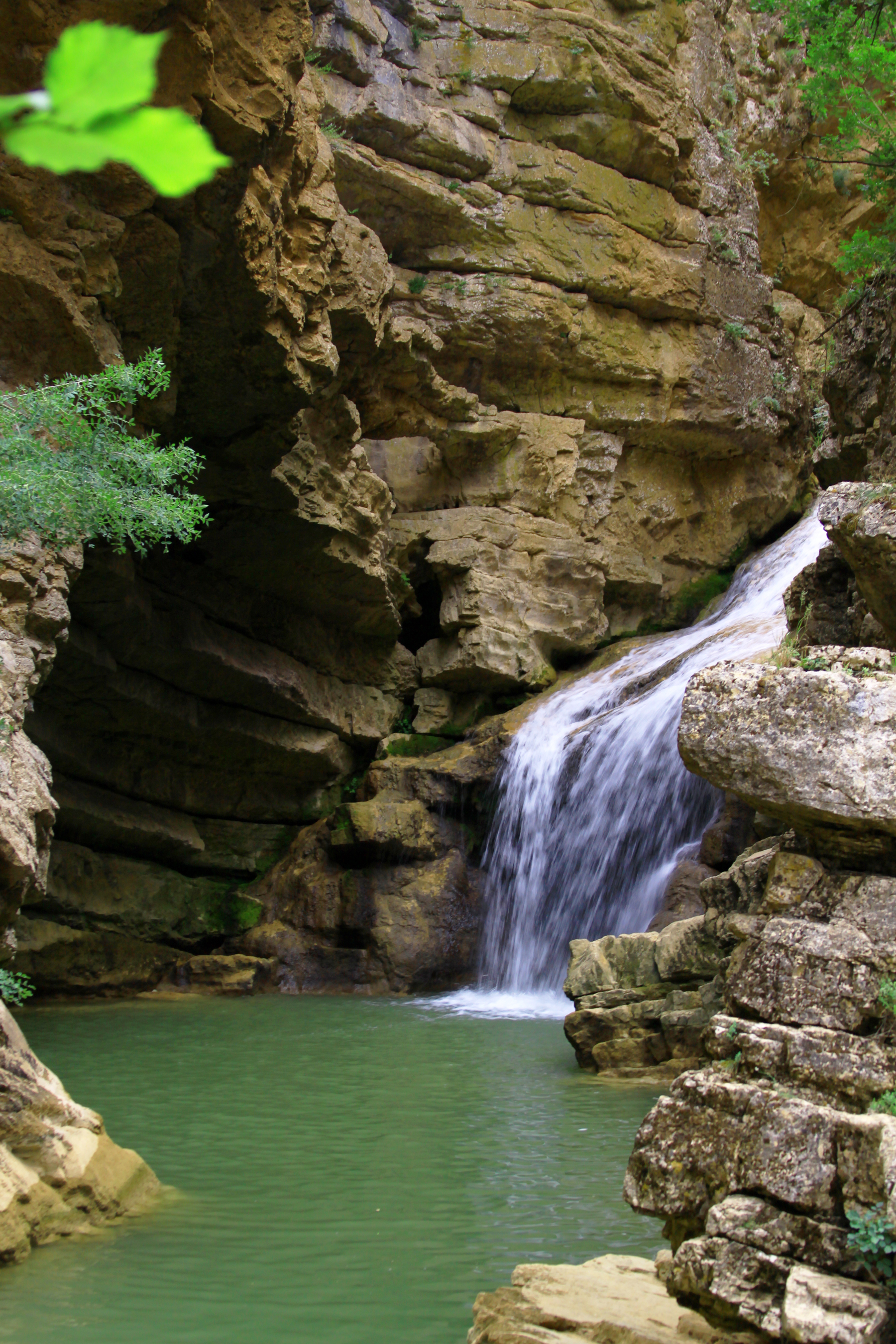

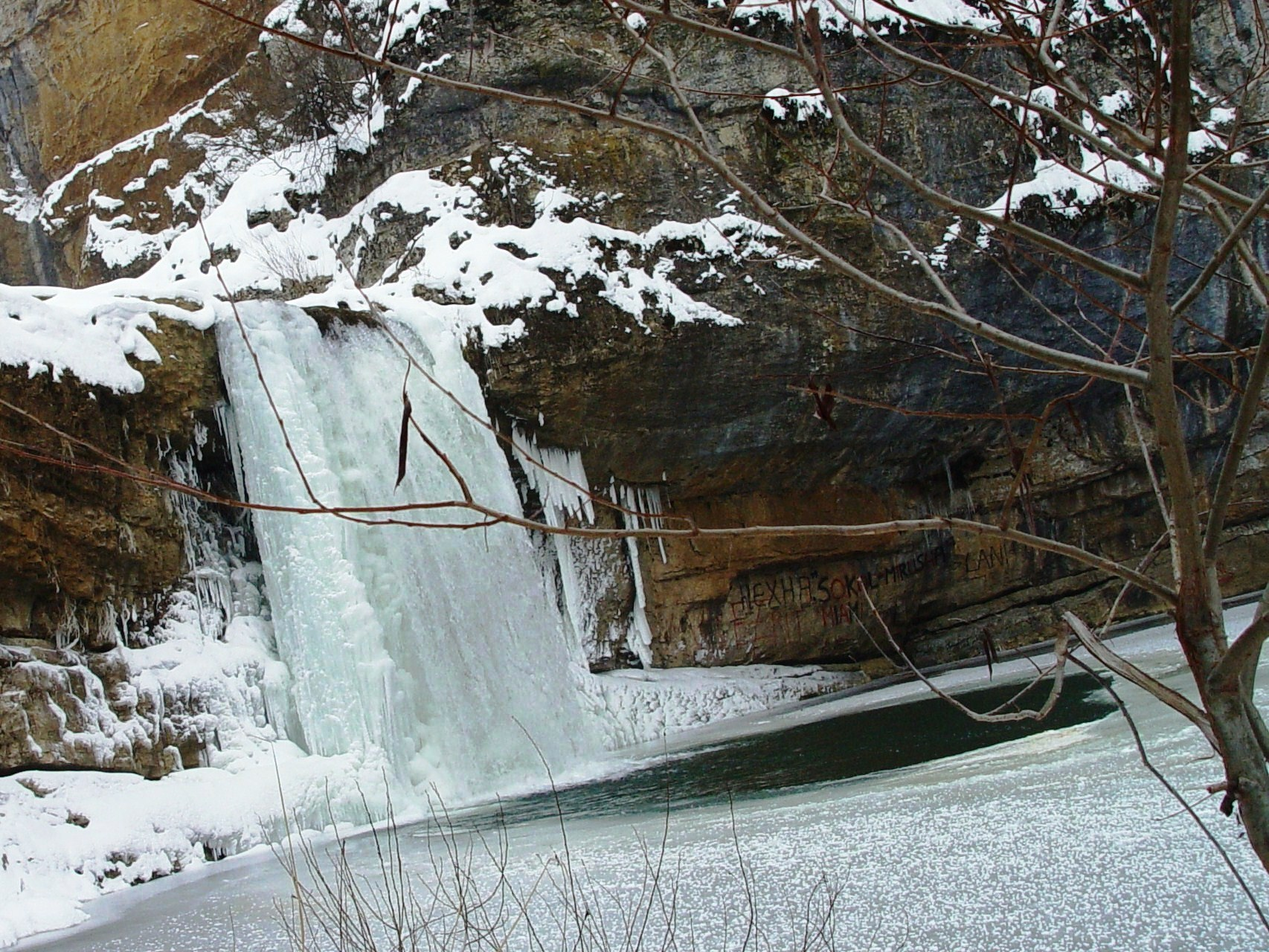
Frozen waterfall of Mirusha.

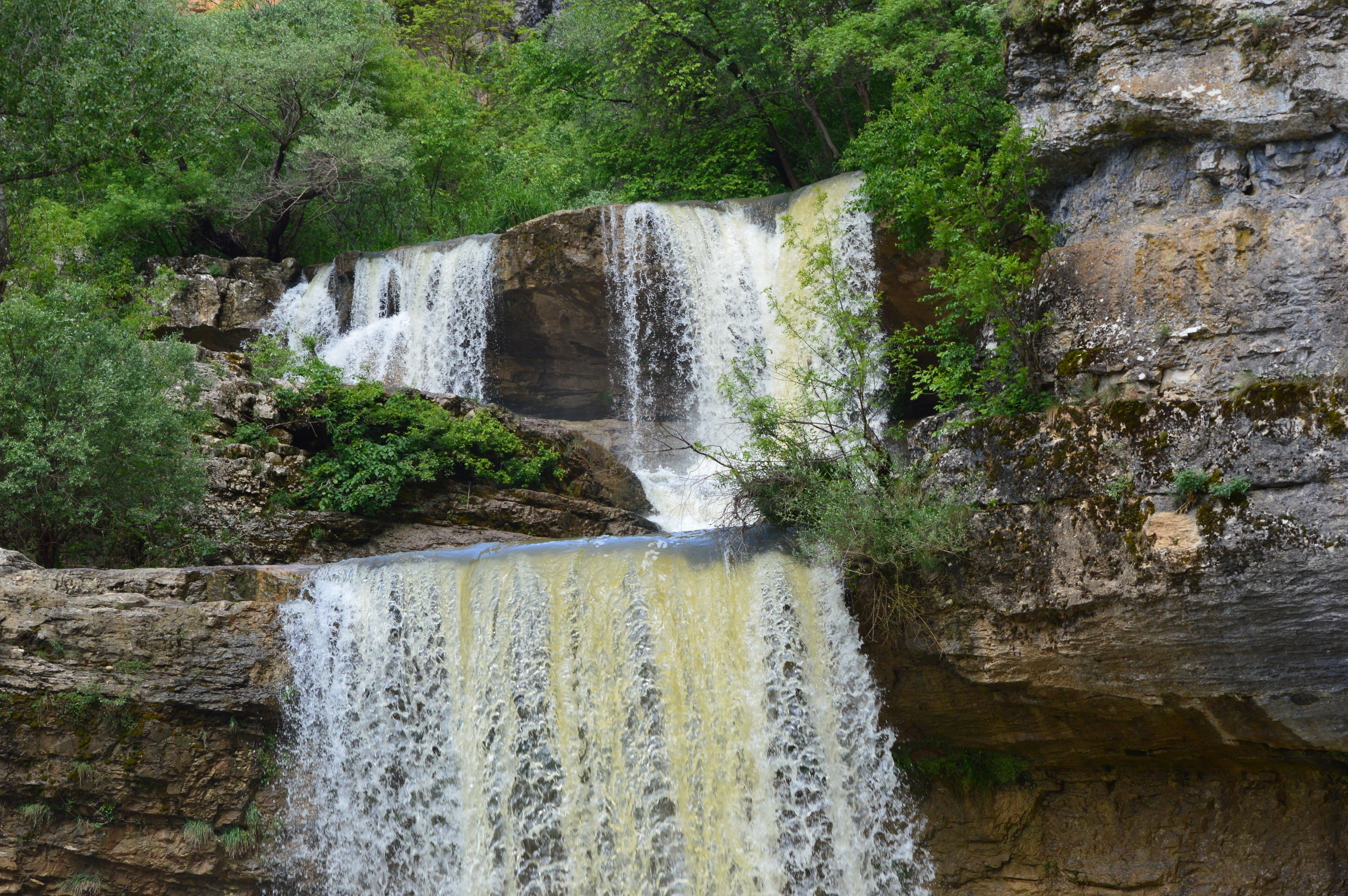
Mirusha Canyon and last waterfalls.

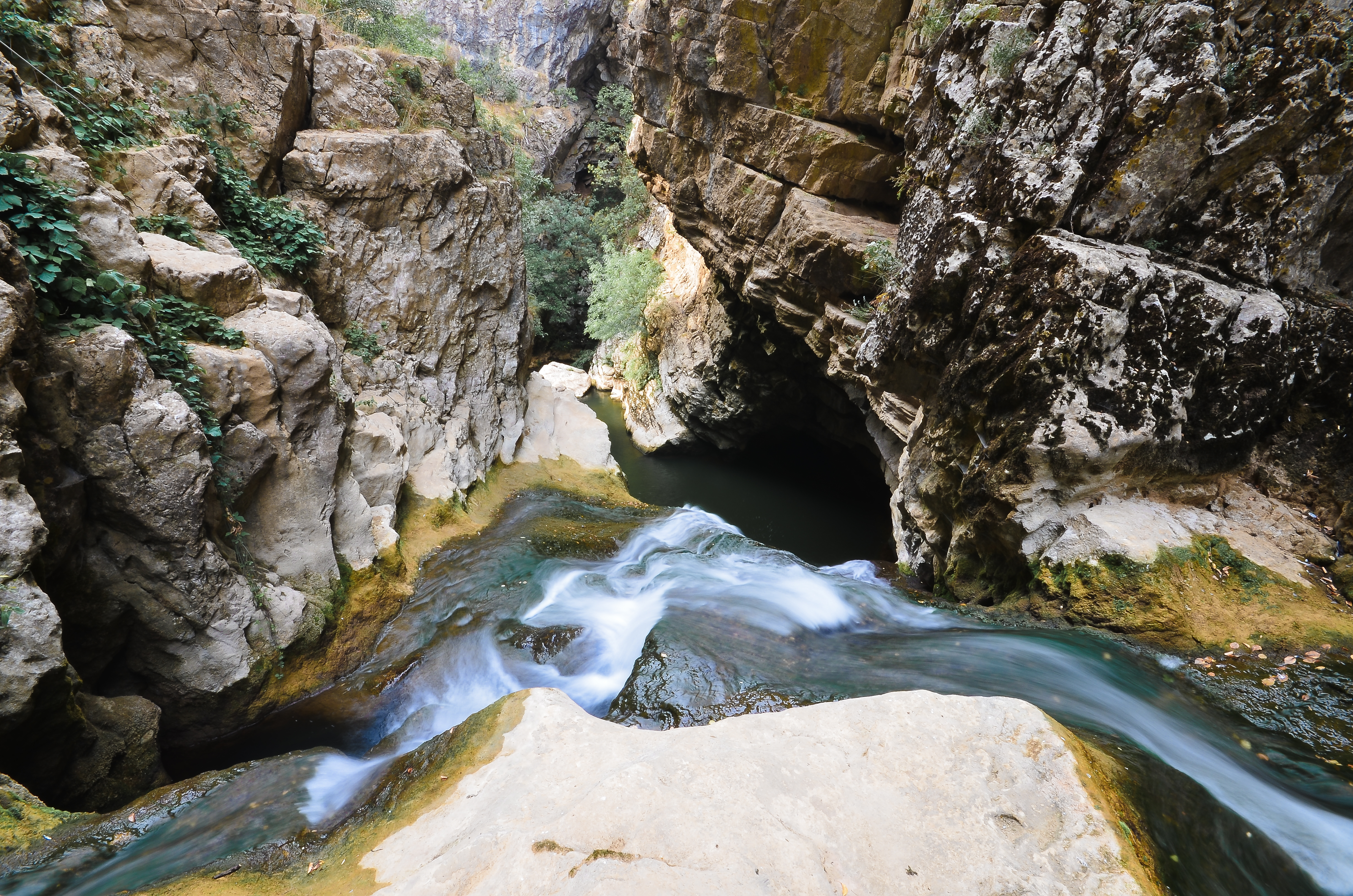
Mirusha Canyon

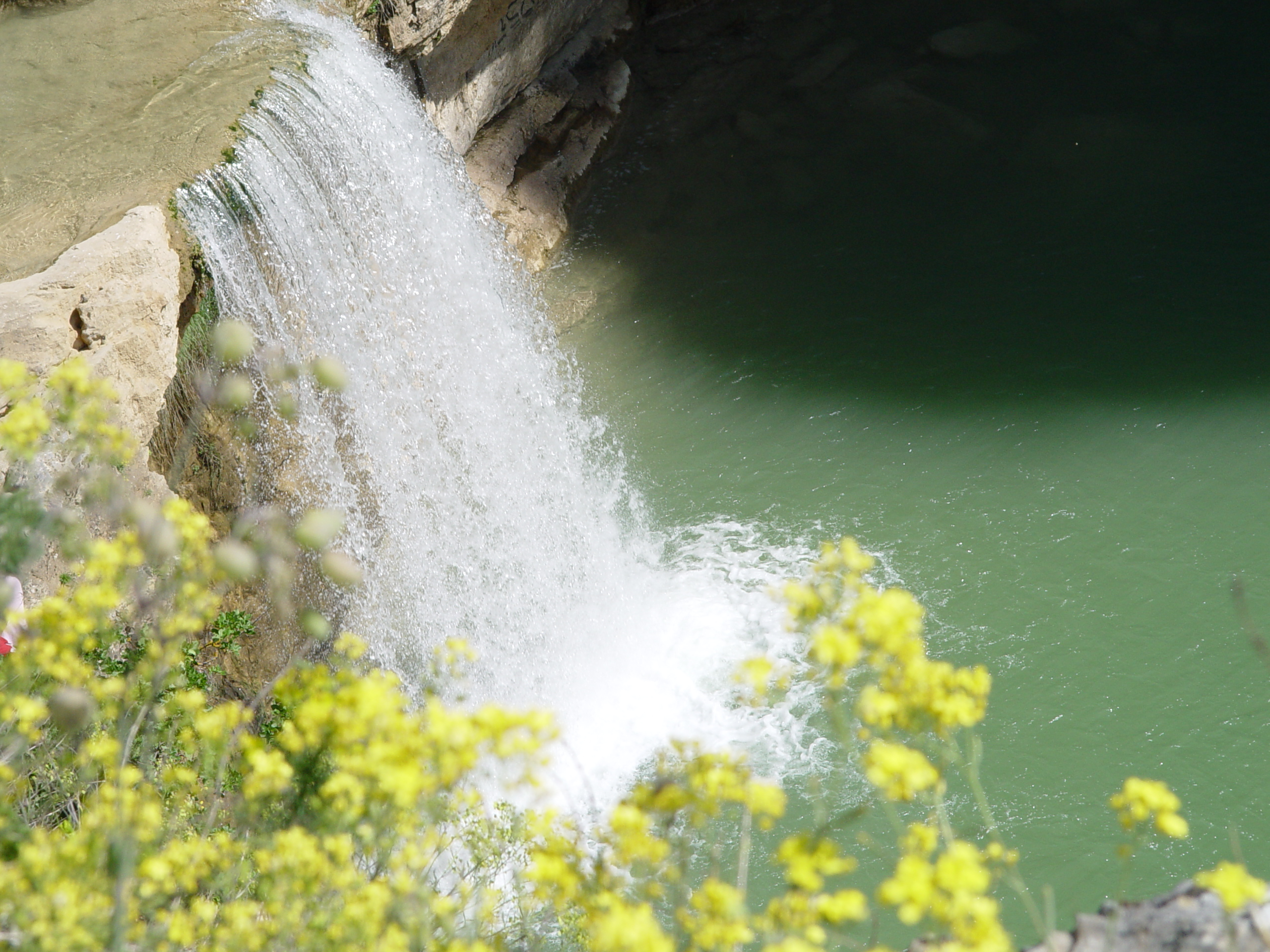

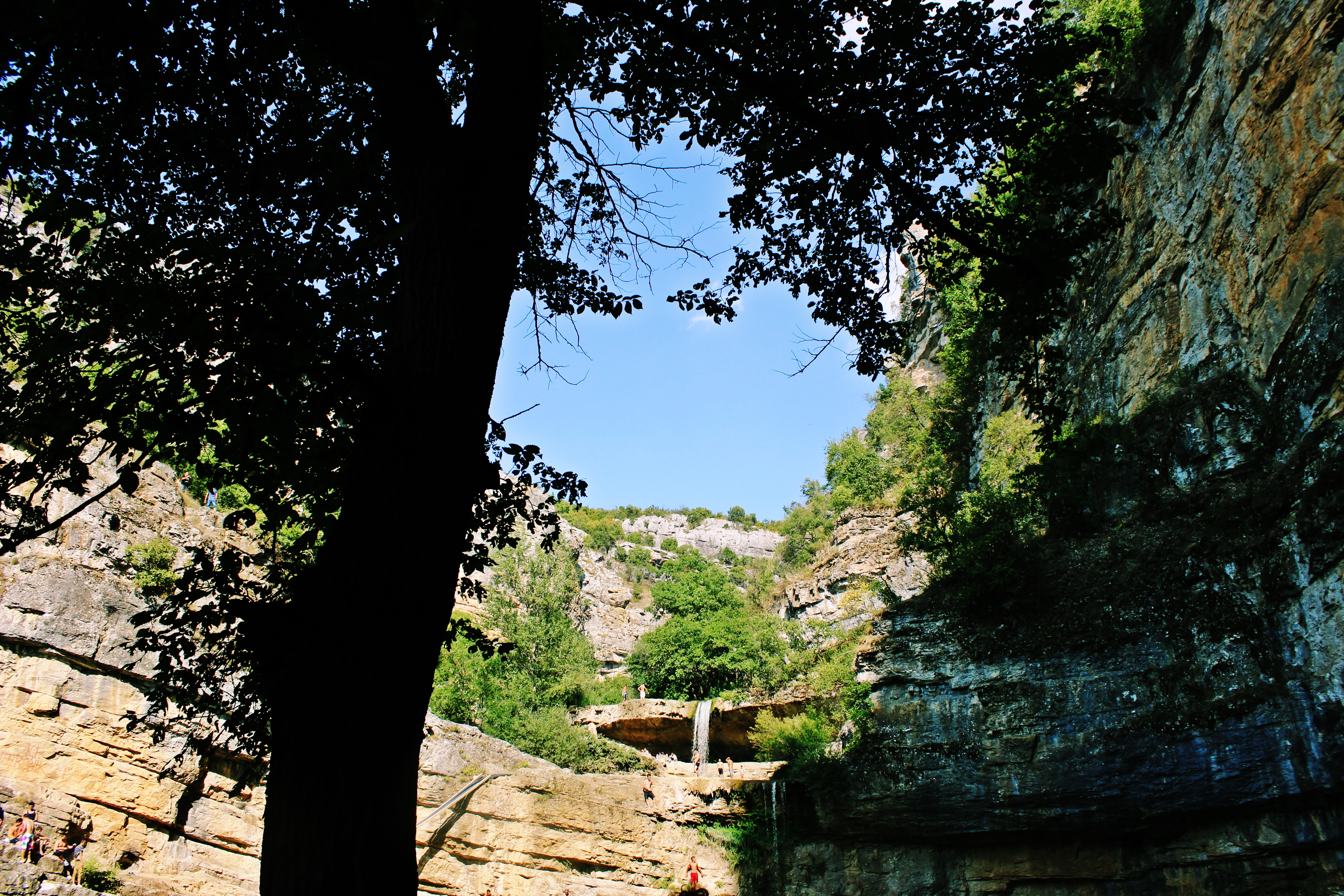

== See also ==
- List of waterfalls
