= Mirusha River =

River in Kosovo

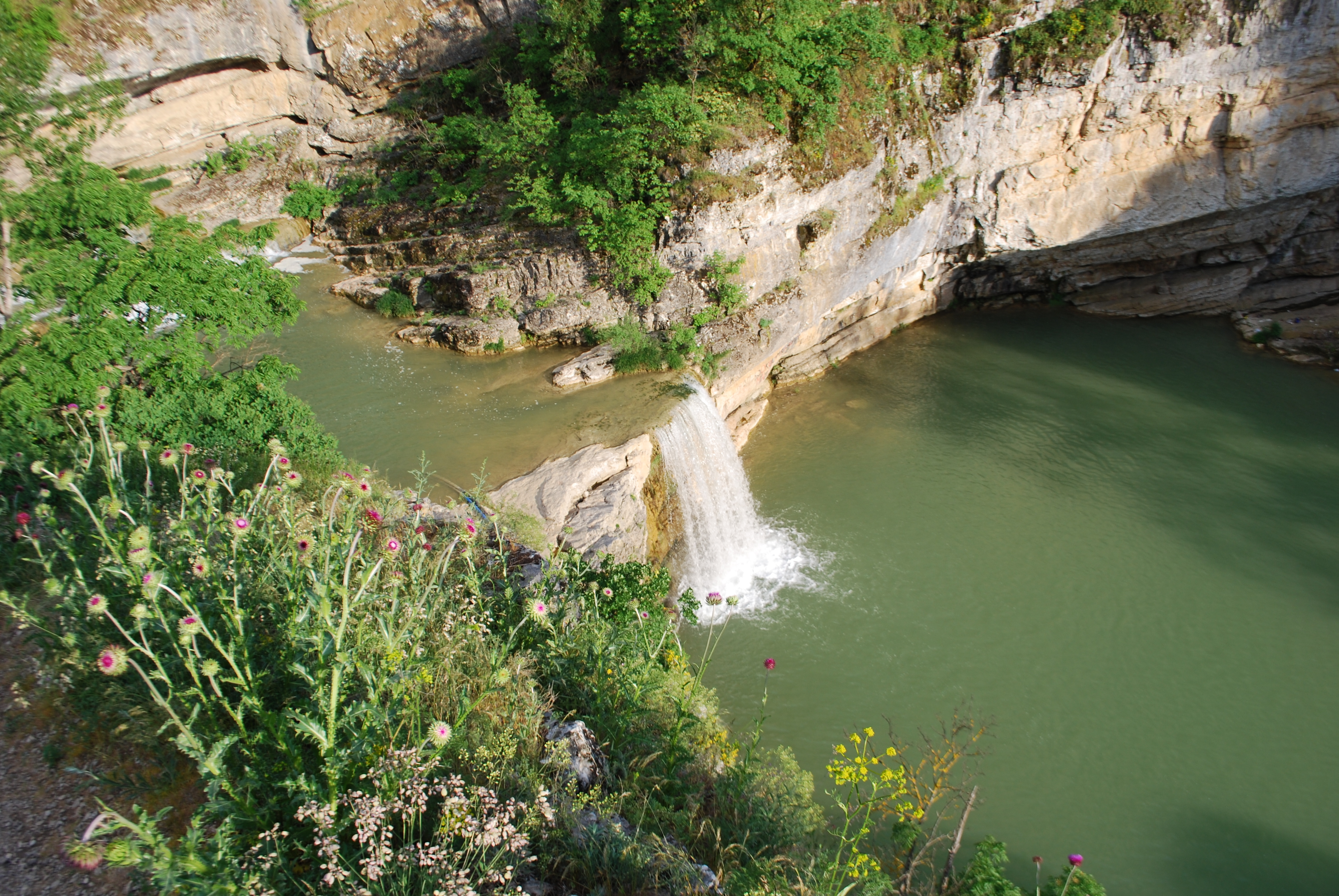
- Mirusha River at its waterfall

Location
- Country: Kosovo

Physical characteristics
- Mouth: White Drin
  - coordinates: 42°31′26″N 20°33′35″E

Basin features
- Progression: White Drin→ Drin→ Adriatic Sea
- Waterfalls: Mirusha waterfalls

Mirusha River is a river in Kosovo. The basin of the river is located in central Kosovo, on the east side of the Dukagjini plain. Mirusha is a left tributary of the White Drin and it is 37 km (23 mi) long.

Mirusha River is especially famous for the Mirusha waterfalls, which are a popular tourist destination in Kosovo.

== See also ==
- Mirusha Park
- Rivers of Kosovo
- Geography of Kosovo
