= Metohija =

Region in Southwest Kosovo

Metohija/Dukagjin Метохија Dukagjini
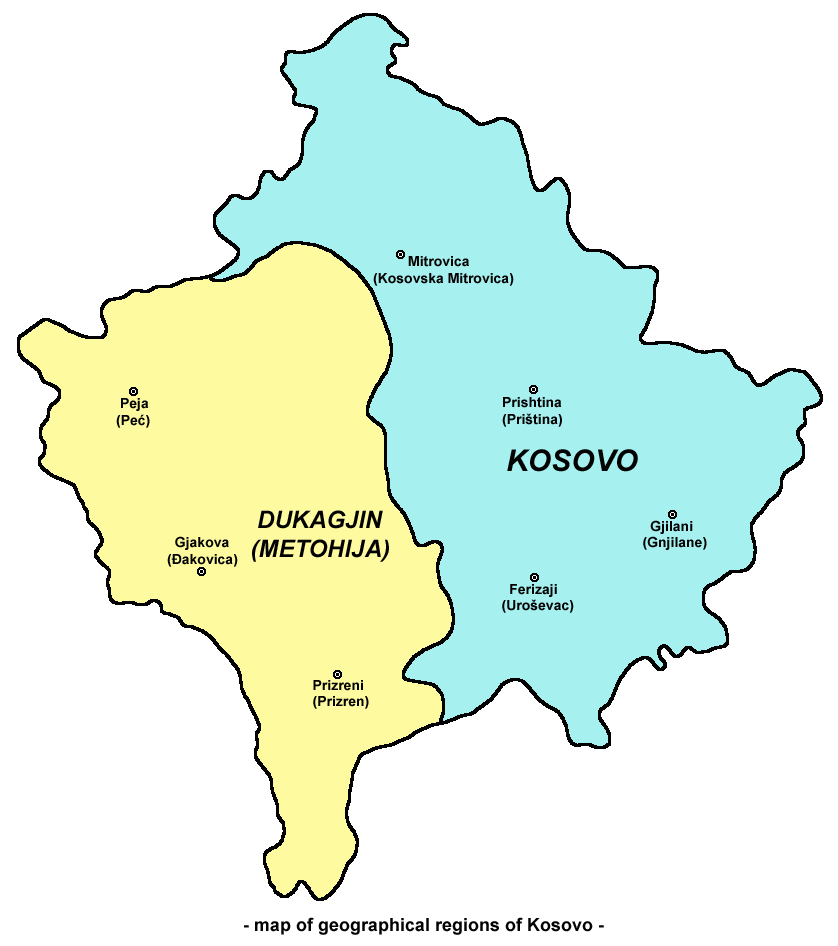
- Districts: Gjakova; Peja; Prizren

Area
  - Total: 3,891 km^{2} (1,502 sq mi)

Population (2024)
  - Total: 570,147
  - Density: 146.5/km^{2} (379.5/sq mi)

Metohija (Serbian: Метохија), also known in Albanian as Dukagjin, (Note: Albanian definite form: Dukagjini) (Albanian: Rrafshi i Dukagjinit, pronounced [ˈrafʃi i dukaˈɟinit]) is a large basin and the name of the region covering the southwestern part of Kosovo. The region covers 35% (3,891 km^{2}) of Kosovo's total area. According to the 2024 census, the population of the region is 570,147.

== Names ==
The name Metohija derives from the Greek word μετόχια (metóchia; singular μετόχιον, metóchion), meaning "monastic estates" – a reference to the large number of villages and estates in the region that were owned by the Serbian Orthodox monasteries and Mount Athos during the Middle Ages.

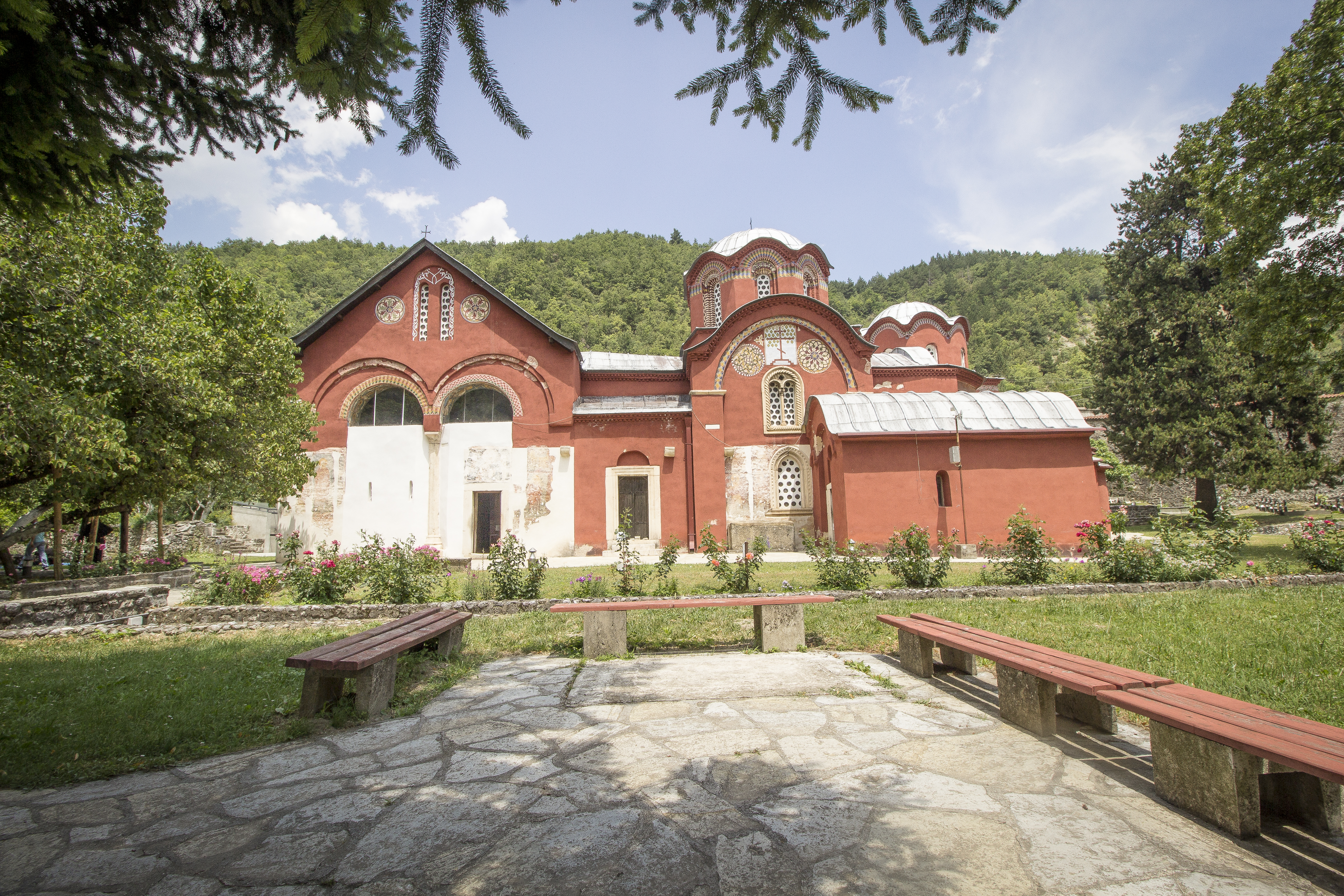
Patriarchal Monastery of Peć, the seat of the Serbian Orthodox Church from the 14th century. The name Metohija means "monastic estates"

In Albanian the area is called Rrafshi i Dukagjinit and means "the plateau of Dukagjin", as the toponym (in Albanian) took the name of the Dukagjini family who ruled a large part of Dukagjini during the 14th-15th centuries. According to Jahja Drançolli, a professor at the University of Pristina, the oldest name for the region is Dukagjin Plain (Note: Albanian definite form: Dukagjini Plain) (Albanian: Rrafshi i Dukagjinit) or simply Dukagjin and the region was under the Sanjak of Dukagjin in the 15th–16th century with its capital in Peja. Drançolli also states that the name 'Metohija' does not appear as a geographic notion in the Medieval and Ottoman period which would have the meaning of the territory of Peja, Gjakova and Prizren. The denomination Metohija only appears as an ecclesiastic property. The name Metohija came first to be used as a geographic notion by Serbian scholars in the 19th-20th century. A similar name is found in Northern Albania, the Dukagjin highlands.

The term "Kosovo and Metohija" (Serbian Cyrillic: Косово и Метохија) was in official use for the Autonomous Region of Kosovo and Metohija (1945–1963), and also for the Autonomous Province of Kosovo and Metohija (1963–1968). The term "Metohija" was dropped from the official name of the province in 1968, and thus the term Kosovo was simply used to refer to the Socialist Autonomous Province of Kosovo, the official name of the province as a whole. The change was not welcomed by Serbs, who continued to use the old name (for example in the 1986 Draft Memorandum of SANU). In September 1990, the new Constitution of the Republic of Serbia was adopted, changing the official name of the province back to the Autonomous Province of Kosovo and Metohija. In 2008, after the Kosovo declaration of independence, Serbia included the term "Metohija" into the official name of the newly formed Ministry for Kosovo and Metohija, which was transformed in 2012 into the Office for Kosovo and Metohija.

== Geography ==
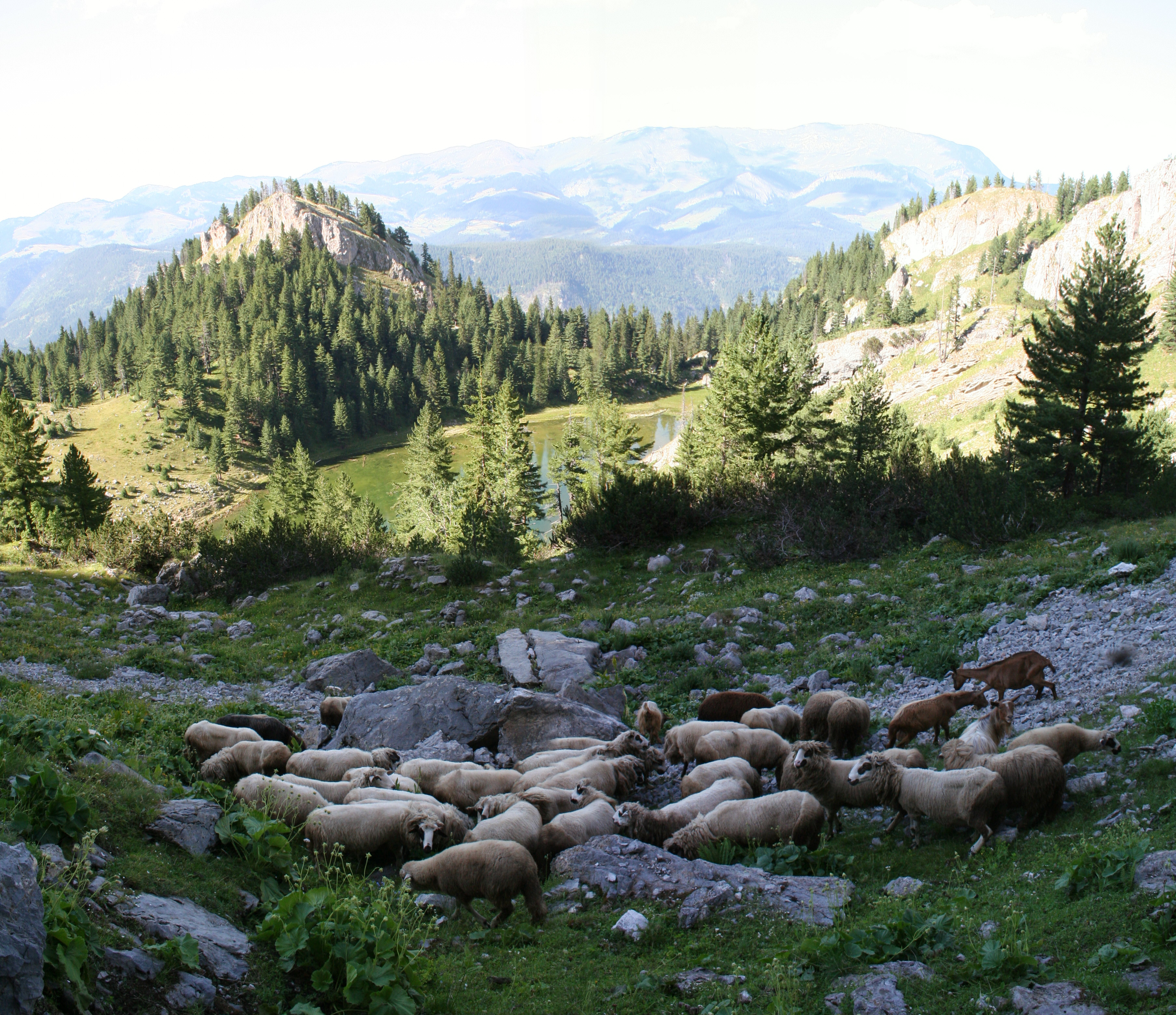
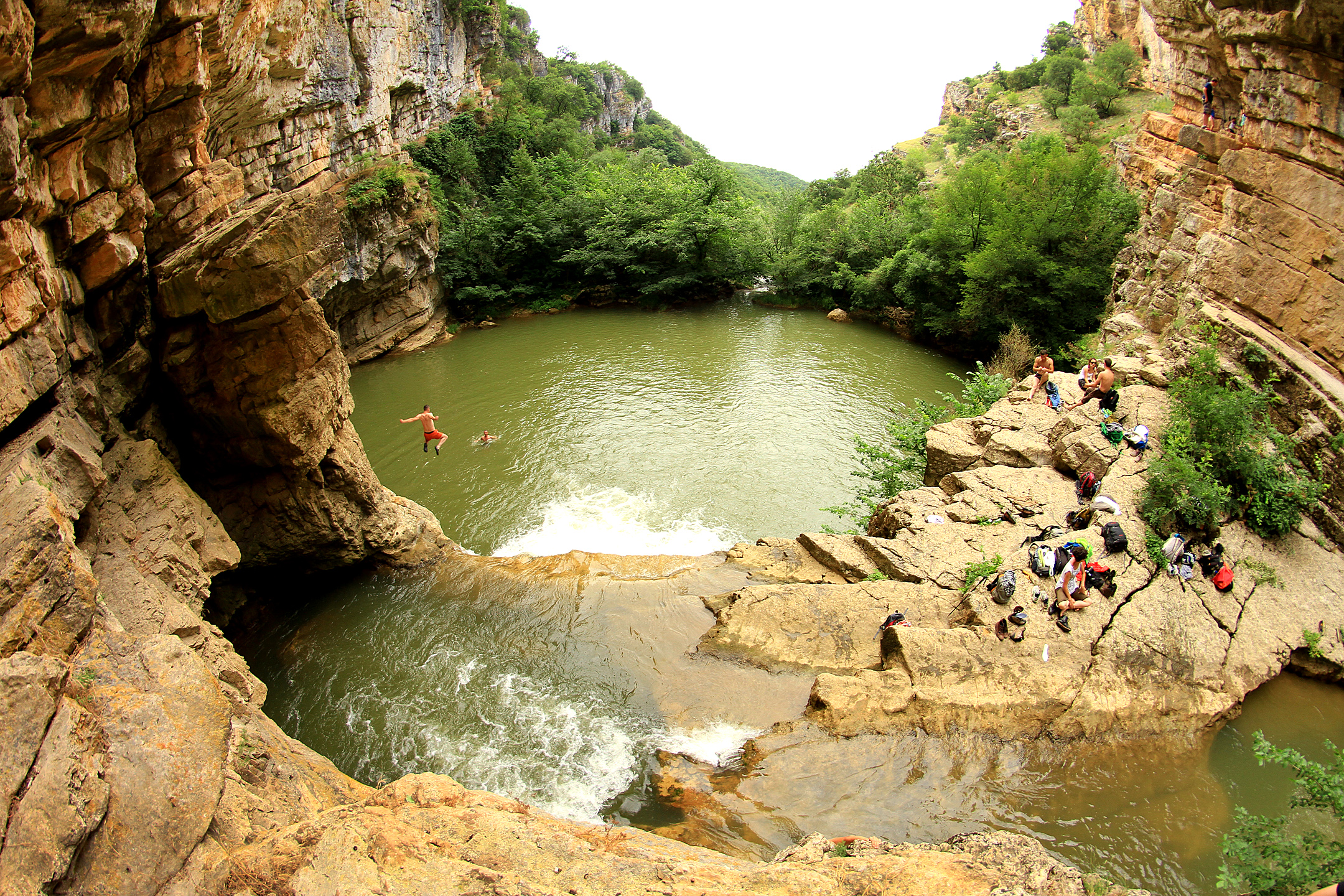
Left: Rugova Canyon, Right: Mirusha Park

Metohija is 23 km (14 mi) wide at its broadest point and about 60 km (37 mi) long, at an average altitude of 450 m (1,476 ft) above sea level. Its principal river is the White Drin. It is bordered by the mountain ranges Mokra Gora in the north and northwest, the Accursed Mountains in the west, Pashtrik in the southwest, the Šar Mountains (Albanian: Malet e Sharrit) in the south and southeast, and Drenica in the east and northeast, which distinguishes it from the rest of Kosovo in the east and northeast.

It encompasses three districts of Kosovo: Gjakova, Peja and Prizren.

The geographic division between Metohija and the rest of Kosovo causes differences between the two areas' flora and fauna. Metohija has the characteristic influences of the Mediterranean.

Metohija consists of fertile arable land with many small rivers which provide water for irrigation and, in combination with the Mediterranean climate, give excellent fields except for cereals. This area is well known for its high-quality vineyards, fruit orchards, and for the growing of chestnut and almond trees.

The geographical region of Metohija is further divided into four parts: Prizrenski Podgor, Llapusha, Reka and Rugova.

== Districts ==
Districts	Population (2024)	Area (km^{2})	Density (per km^{2})
Gjakova	152,311	1,129	134,9
Peja	146,301	1,365	107.2
Prizren	271,535	1,397	194.4
Metohija	570,147	3,891	146.5

== History ==
=== Prehistory ===
Based on archaeology, the region of Kosovo and Metohija and the Morava Valley were interconnected in the Neolithic (Starčevo and Vinča) and Eneolithic. The Triballi of Morava entered Kosovo in two waves in the 8th and 7th centuries BC, then took part in the genesis of the Dardani. Necropolises near Zhur suggest that the southwestern-most part of Metohija at the end of 6th century BC was subject to Illyrian influx. After the Roman conquests, the Metohija region was divided into Dardania and Praevalitana.

=== Middle Ages ===
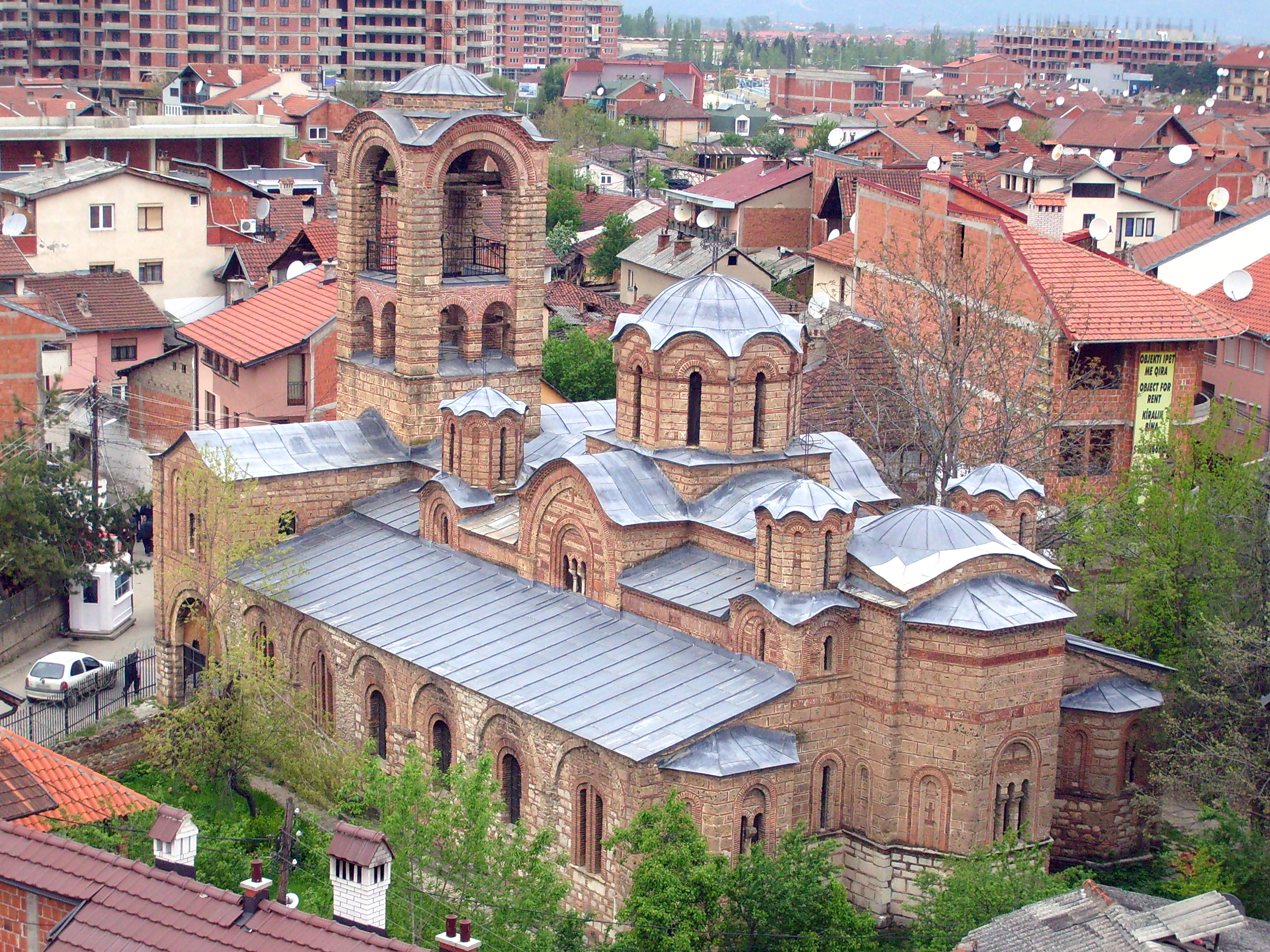
Our Lady of Ljeviš in Prizren, founded by Serbian King Stefan Milutin (1282–1321)

Coinciding with the decline of the Roman Empire, many "barbarian" tribes passed through the Balkans, most of whom did not leave any lasting state. The Slavs, however, overwhelmed the Balkans in the 6th and 7th centuries. The region was conquered by Bulgaria in the early 10th century, after which Byzantine rule was restored, briefly ca. 970–975, and again after 1018. In terms of ecclesiastical administration, the region of Metohija belonged to the Eparchy of Prizren, created in 1019. During the 11th and the 12th century, the region was contested between the Grand Principality of Serbia and the Byzantine Empire. Serbian Grand Prince Stefan Nemanja was recognized as independent in 1190, keeping northern parts of the Metohija (region of Hvosno), while southern parts were incorporated into the Kingdom of Serbia by the beginning of the 13th century. After the Fall of the Serbian Empire in 1371, the region of Metohija was controlled by the Balšić family of Zeta, and since 1378 by the Branković family. The region was also controlled by the Principality of Dukagjini. It was part of the Serbian Despotate until 1455, when it was conquered by the Ottoman Empire.

The Ottoman registers from the 16th century suggest the plains were inhabited by a majority Albanian population. This Albanian population mainly devoted itself to agriculture and consisted of Christians. Albanian anthroponomy and onomastics could be found next to Slavic ones, and there are many cases of mixed Slav-Albanian anthroponomy. The Slavic element in the region during this period was mainly located in pockets in the Nahiya of Peja and in the Nahiya of Prizren.

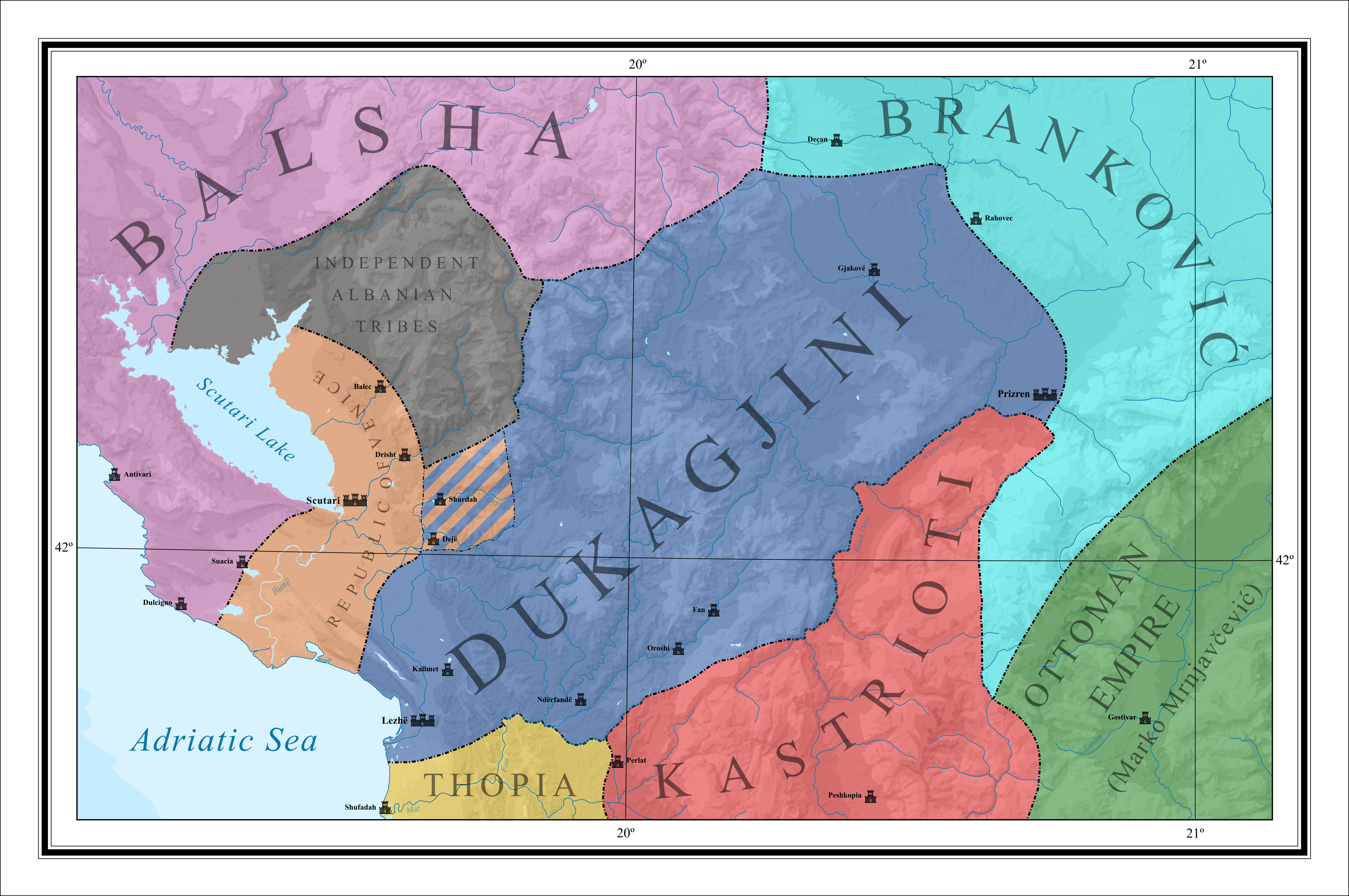
Lands of the Dukagjini, 1387-1393

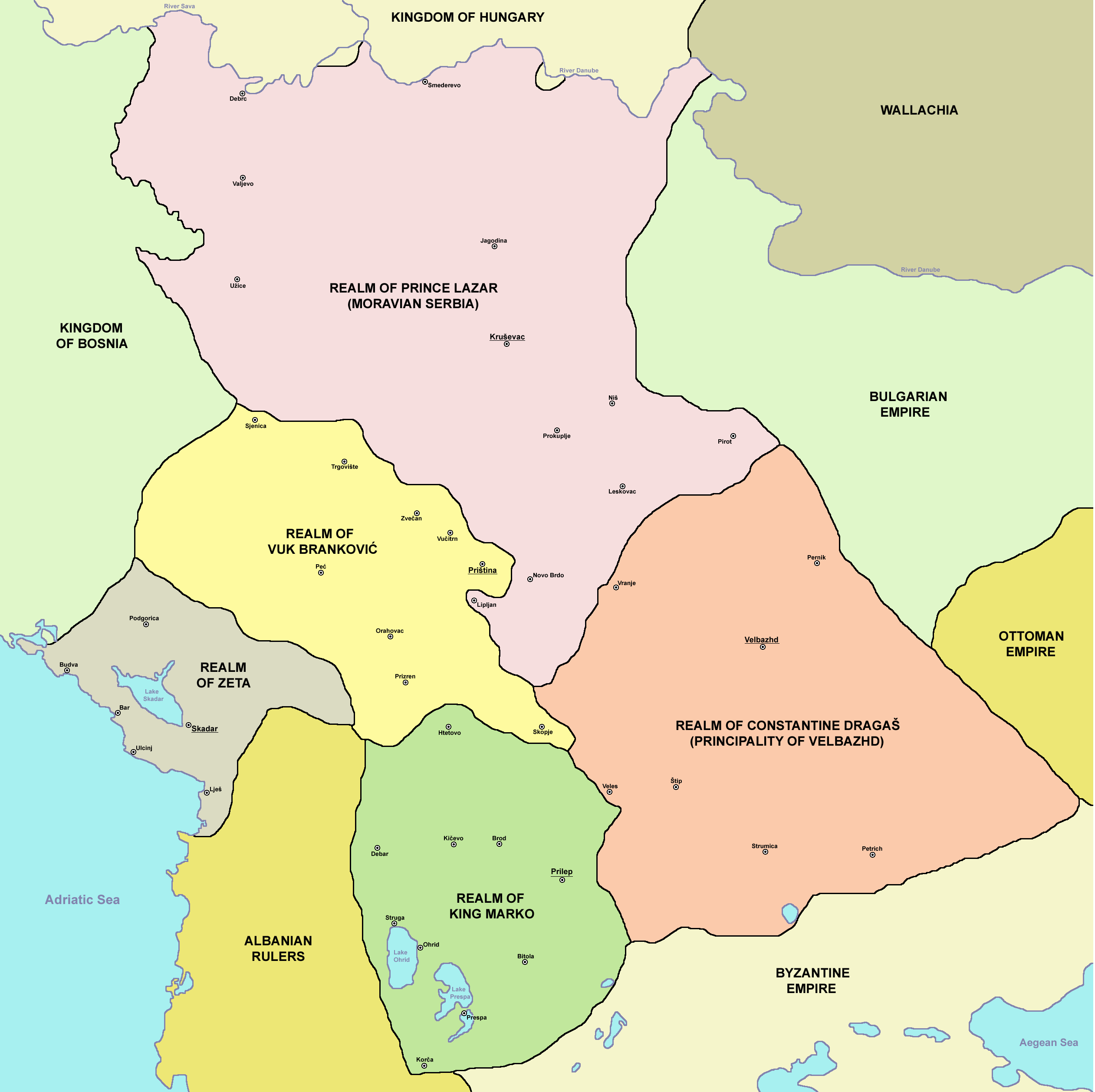
Lands in the Central Balkans in the 14th century (1373–1395)

=== Early modern ===
Metohija was conquered by the Ottoman Empire in 1455 and incorporated into the Sanjak of Prizren (southern part of Metohija) and Sanjak of Peć (northern part of Metohija). In 1878, after several administrative reforms, the region was included into Ottoman Vilayet of Kosovo.

=== Modern ===
Much of the area was taken by the Kingdom of Montenegro in the 1912 First Balkan War except for the Prizren area, conquered by the Kingdom of Serbia. During the First World War, Montenegro was conquered by the Austro-Hungarian forces in 1915. The Central Powers were pushed out of Metohija by the Serbian Army in 1918. Montenegro subsequently joined the Kingdom of Serbia, which was followed by the formation of the Kingdom of Serbs, Croats and Slovenes. The Kingdom was reformed into the Kingdom of Yugoslavia in 1929. The Kingdom suffered an Axis invasion during World War II in 1941, and the region of Metohija was incorporated into Italian-controlled Albania, with the Italians employing the "Vulnetari", an Albanian volunteer militia, to control the villages. After Italy's treaty with the Allies in 1943, the Germans took direct control over the region, supported by the local Albanian collaborationists (Balli Kombëtar). After numerous rebellions of Serb Chetniks and Yugoslav Partisans, Metohija was liberated from Nazi occupation by the Partisans in November 1944. In 1946, it became part of Serbia's Autonomous Province of Kosovo and Metohija, within the transitional Democratic Federal Yugoslavia.

On 17 February 2008, representatives of Kosovo Albanians, declared Kosovo's independence and subsequently adopted the Constitution of Republic of Kosovo, which came into effect on 15 June 2008. Serbia still considers Metohija part of its territory.

== Sources ==
- Bennett, Christopher (1995). Yugoslavia's Bloody Collapse: Causes, Course and Consequences. London: Hurst & Company. ISBN 9781850652281.
- Ćirković, Sima (2004). The Serbs. Malden: Blackwell Publishing. ISBN 9781405142915.
- Krieger, Heike (2001). The Kosovo Conflict and International Law: An Analytical Documentation 1974–1999. Cambridge: Cambridge University Press. ISBN 9780521800716.
- Pejin, Jovan (2006). "The Extermination of the Serbs in Metohia, 1941-1944". Срби на Косову и у Метохији: Зборник радова са научног скупа (PDF). Београд: Српска академија наука и уметности. pp. 189–207. Archived from the original (PDF) on 2017-08-01.
- Pavlowitch, Stevan K. (2002). Serbia: The History behind the Name. London: Hurst & Company. ISBN 9781850654773.
