= Begracë =

Begracë: Begracë (Albanian); Belograce (Serbian)
- Interactive map of Begracë
- Location in Kosovo
- Location: Kosovo
- District: Ferizaj
- Municipality: Kaçanik

Population (2024)
  - Total: 1,904
- Time zone: UTC+1 (CET)
  - Summer (DST): UTC+2 (CEST)

Begracë (Albanian: Begracë, Serbian: Belograce) is a village in the municipality of Kaçanik, Kosovo. Begracë is located on the Karadak Mountain range and borders the Anamorava Valley to the north.

== History ==
Begracë is mostly inhabited by the Gashi clan which moved to the area after the being evicted by the Pasha of Peja in 1697, “The village of Gashi with 120 houses, which were evicted from Pasha of Peja, are now located in the area of Kosovo, in a place called Llap, who are living there for 8 years, which are without priests and have begun to become Turkish (Muslim) and schismatic due to the lack of Catholic priests". The Gashi inhabitants are divided into the brotherhoods Luzha and Gash i Gurit.

Oda of the Luzha family was built in the 1840’s, at the same time the Begracë Mosque was also built.
