= Talinoc i Jerlive =

Talinoc i Jerlive: Talinoc i Jerlive (Albanian); Јерли Талиновац/Jerli Talinovac (Serbian)
- Village
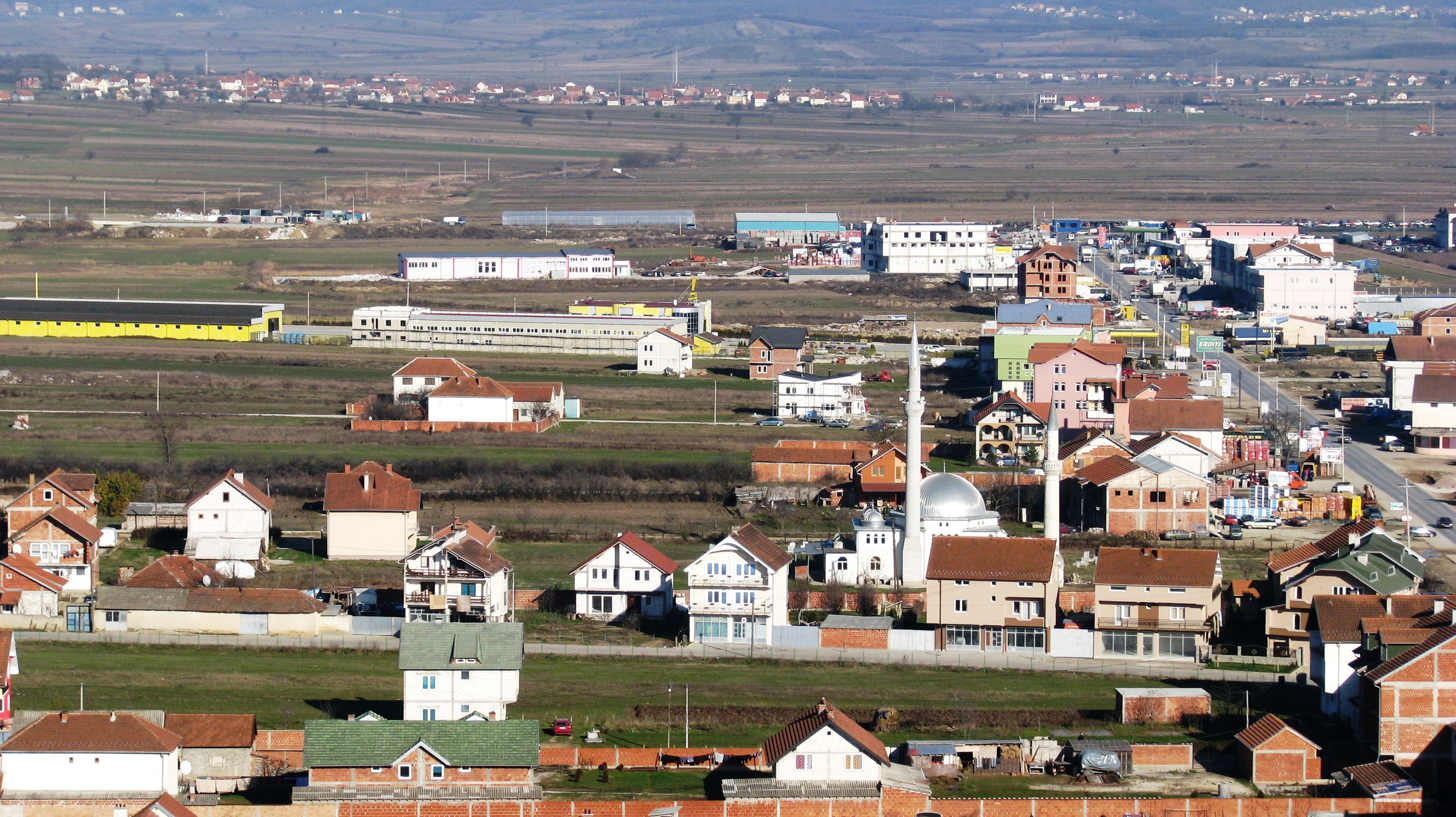

- Location within Kosovo
- Coordinates: 42.386298°N 21.151382°E
- Location: Kosovo
- District: Ferizaj
- Municipality: Ferizaj
- Elevation: 575 m (1,886 ft)

Population (2024)
  - Total: 3,920
- Time zone: UTC+1 (CET)
  - Summer (DST): UTC+2 (CEST)

Talinoc i Jerlive (Albanian: Talinoc i Jerlive, Serbian Cyrillic: Јерли Талиновац/Jerli Talinovac) is a village in Ferizaj municipality, Kosovo.
