= Bob, Kaçanik =

Neighbourhood of Kaçanik, Kosovo

Bob Bobi
- Neighbourhood and Village
- Bob
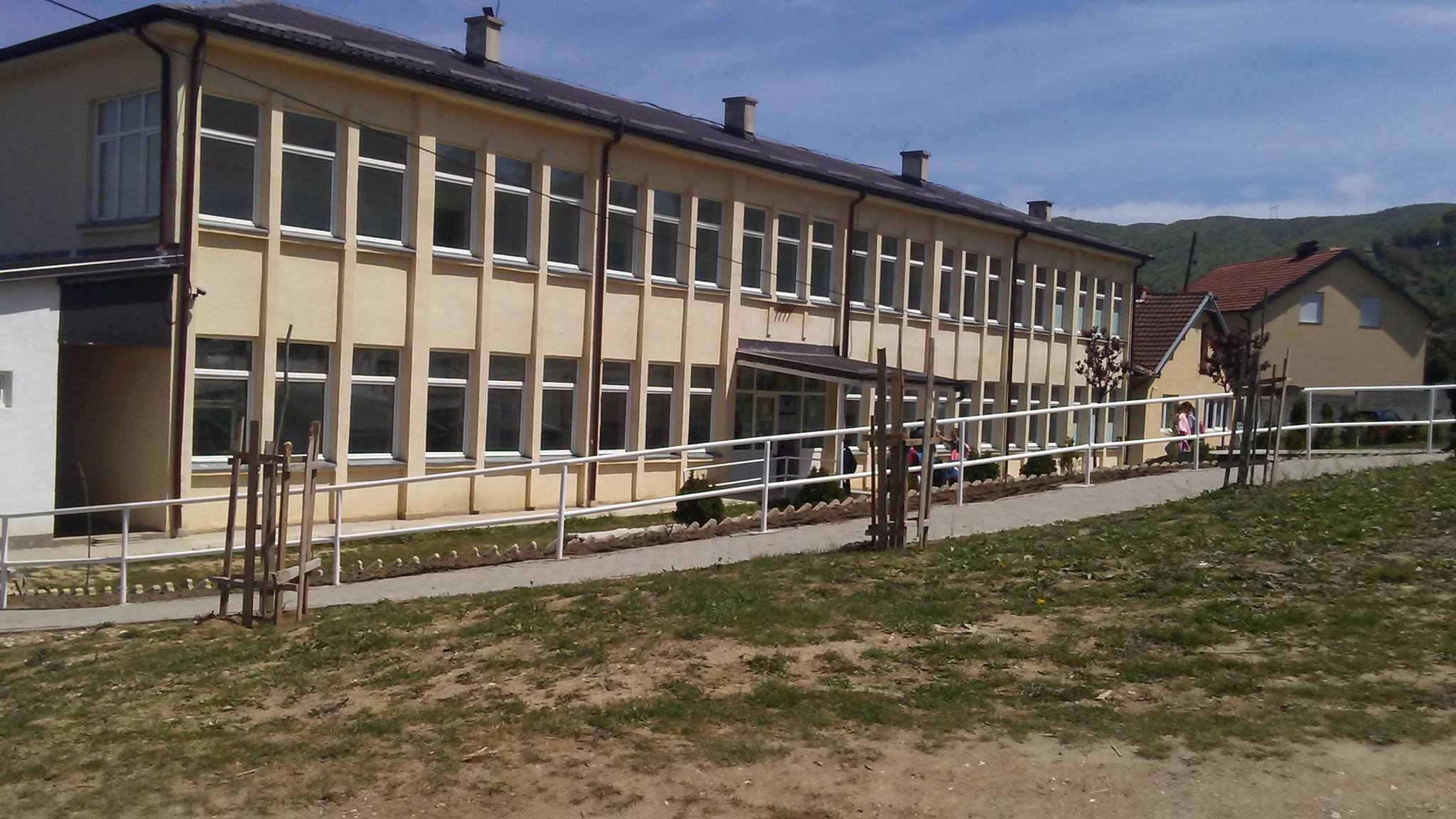
- Shkolla fillore "Idriz Seferi" Bob
- Interactive map of Bob
- Location within Kosovo
- Coordinates: 42°13′39″N 21°15′02″E
- Country: Kosovo
- Municipality: Kaçanik
- Elevation: 503 m (1,650 ft)

Population (2024)
  - Total: 1,377
- Demonym: Albanian: Bobqorr (m) Bobqorre (f)
- Time zone: UTC+1 (CET)
- Postal code: 71000
- Country code: +383 (0) 290
- Vehicle registration: 05
- Motorway: R6
- National road: N2
- International E-road: E65

Bob is a neighbourhood within the town of Kaçanik in southern Kosovo. It is regarded as one of the town's traditional areas and has developed alongside the urban expansion of Kaçanik.

== History ==
Bob is recognised as one of the oldest neighbourhoods of Kaçanik, with several families demonstrating a long-standing presence in the town. Extended family names such as Çaka, Zeneli and Dema are frequently referenced in local oral history and tradition as being among the earliest settlers in the area. Additionally, members of the Çaka family from Bob are noted among the fallen soldiers (dëshmorët) of the Kosovo conflict.

=== Hasan's Tower ===
In Bob, stands Hasan's Tower (also known as the Tower of Rambuje). During the Kosovo War, this tower served as the headquarters of the KLA (UÇK) in the Kaçanik area, hosting units of the 162nd Agim Bajrami Brigade. The 3rd Company, under the command of Feriz Guri, was stationed in this building.

After the war, Hasan's Tower has often been visited during commemorative activities, especially on Albanian Independence Day, and is considered a symbol of resistance and national heroism.

== Geography ==
Bob is situated on the western side of Kaçanik. It borders the town centre and is connected to neighbouring areas via local road networks as well as with major Motorway and National road running through Bob such as R6 E65 and N2.

== Population ==
According to census records and locally available data, population changes in the neighbourhood of Bob can be summarised as follows:

Year	Population
1948	387
1953	450
1961	528
1971	627
1981	1,070
1991	1,134
2011	1,796
2024	1,377

== Notable people ==
- Agim Çaka, Kosovar political figure, former Deputy Minister of Health of Kosovo.
- Jeton Raka, Kosovar politician and former Deputy Minister of Environment, Spatial Planning and Infrastructure of Kosovo, from Bob, Kaçanik.

== See also ==
- Kaçanik
- Lepenci (River runs between Bob & Kaçanik)
- Kaçanik Gorge
