= Besnik Begunca Stadium =

Stadium in Kaçanik, Kosovo

Palestra Sportive- Bob,Kaçanik
- Interactive map of Palestra Sportive- Bob,Kaçanik
- Address: 31 Vëllezërit Çaka Road; Bob; Kosovo
- Location: Bob, Kaçanik
- Coordinates: 42°13′39″N 21°15′16″E
- Owner: Municipality of Kaçanik
- Surface: Artificial
- Field size: 105 m × 68 m (115 yd × 74 yd)
- Public transit: Bus station Kaçanik

Construction
- Built: 2016-2017
- Opened: 2017
- Cost: €340,000

Tenant
- KF Lepenci (2017–present)

Besnik Begunca Stadium (Albanian: Palestra Sportive e Kaçanikut) is the home stadium of KF Lepenci in Kaçanik, Kosovo. In 2016-2017 it was built a new stadium for the club, which cost over €340,000. The stadium located in “Vëllezërit Çaka” Road. Number 31 Bob, Kaçanik.
