= Postal codes in Serbia =

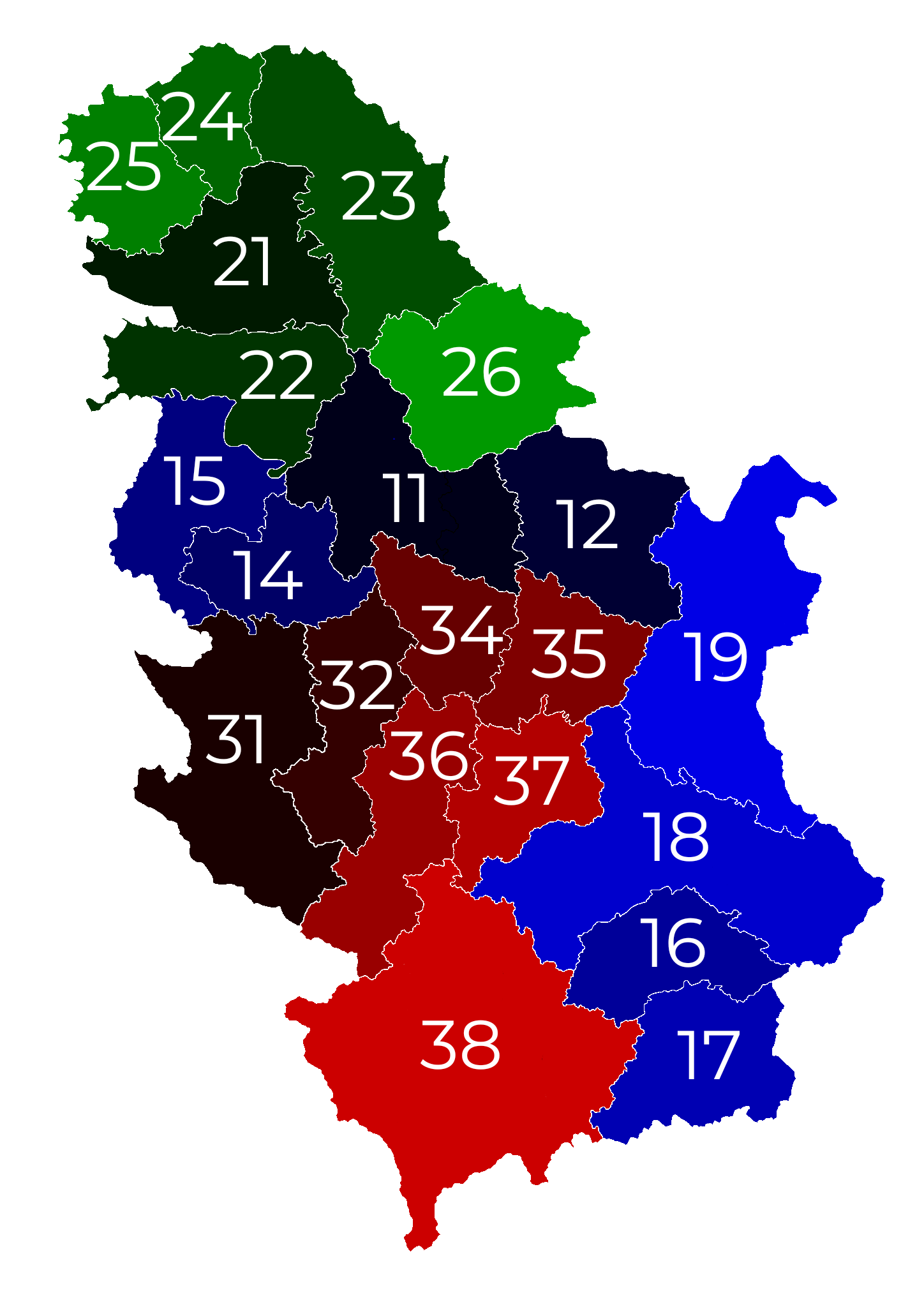
First two digits of a postcode in Serbia

Serbian postal codes consist of five digits. The first two digits roughly correspond to the corresponding district; district seat cities usually have 000 as the last three digits, while smaller towns and villages have non-round last three digits.

A six-digit postcode format has been in place since 1 January 2005.

== See also ==
- Postal codes in Kosovo
