= List of cities and towns in Kosovo =

The largest cities of Kosovo.

This is a list of cities and towns in Kosovo in alphabetical order categorised by municipality or district, according to the criteria used by the Kosovo Agency of Statistics (KAS). Kosovo's population is distributed in 1,467 settlements with 26 per cent of its population concentrated in 7 regional centers, consisting of Drenas, Ferizaj, Gjakova, Gjilan, Mitrovica, Peja, Pristina and Prizren.

According to the 2024 census, the cities in Kosovo are classified into the following population size categories:

- 1 city larger than 200,000: Pristina
- 4 cities from 50,000 to 100,000: Ferizaj, Gjilan, Fushë Kosova and Prizren
- 6 cities from 20,000 to 50,000: Drenas, Gjakova, Mitrovica, Peja, Podujevë and Vushtrri

== List ==
City	Albanian	Serbian	Municipality	District	Population (2011)	Population (2024)	Geographic coordinates
Deçan	Deçan	Dečani	Deçan	Gjakova	3,803	5,390	42°32′16″N 20°17′28″E
Dragash	Dragash or Sharr	Dragaš	Dragash	Prizren	1,098	1,332	42°3′45″N 20°39′12″E
Drenas	Drenas or Gllogoc	Glogovac	Drenas	Pristina	6,143	12,315	42°37′25″N 20°53′38″E
Ferizaj	Ferizaj	Uroševac	Ferizaj	Ferizaj	42,628	55,931	42°22′12″N 21°9′18″E
Kosovo Polje	Fushë Kosova	Kosovo Polje	Fushë Kosova	Pristina	18,515	50,904	42°38′15″N 21°5′39″E
Gjakova	Gjakovë	Đakovica	Gjakova	Gjakova	40,827	44,370	42°22′37″N 20°25′55″E
Gjilan	Gjilan	Gnjilane	Gjilan	Gjilan	54,239	53,279	42°27′53″N 21°28′1″E
Istog	Istog or Burim	Istok	Istog	Peja	5,115	8,466	42°46′51″N 20°29′15″E
Kaçanik	Kaçanik	Kačanik	Kaçanik	Ferizaj	10,393	9,653	42°13′57″N 21°16′8″E
Kamenica	Kamenicë or Dardanë	Kosovska Kamenica	Kamenica	Gjilan	7,331	8,931	42°34′32″N 21°34′53″E
Klina	Klinë	Klina	Klina	Peja	5,908	8,246	42°37′18″N 20°34′40″E
Lipjan	Lipjan	Lipljan	Lipjan	Pristina	6,870	13,092	42°31′20″N 21°7′27″E
Malisheva	Malishevë	Mališevo	Malisheva	Prizren	3,395	3,849	42°28′58″N 20°44′46″E
Mitrovica	Mitrovicë	Kosovska Mitrovica	Mitrovica	Mitrovica	46,132	46,597	42°53′24″N 20°52′12″E
Obiliq	Obiliq or Kastriot	Obilić	Obilić	Pristina	6,864	7,634	42°41′24″N 21°4′40″E
Peja	Pejë	Peć	Peja	Peja	48,962	42,497	42°39′37″N 20°17′30″E
Podujevë	Podujevë or Besianë	Podujevo	Podujevë	Pristina	23,453	20,330	42°54′42″N 21°11′30″E
Pristina	Prishtinë	Priština	Pristina	Pristina	161,751	204,925	42°39′48″N 21°9′44″E
Prizren	Prizren	Prizren	Prizren	Prizren	94,517	90,209	42°12′46″N 20°44′21″E
Rahovec	Rahovec	Orahovac	Rahovec	Gjakova	15,892	13 642	42°24′3″N 20°39′25″E
Skenderaj	Skenderaj	Srbica	Skenderaj	Mitrovica	6,612	9,451	42°44′51″N 20°47′17″E
Suhareka	Suharekë or Therandë	Suva Reka	Suhareka	Prizren	10,422	9,896	42°21′44″N 20°50′0″E
Štrpce	Shtërpcë	Štrpce	Štrpce	Ferizaj	1,265	2,430	42°14′5″N 21°1′28″E
Shtime	Shtime	Štimlje	Shtime	Ferizaj	7,255	7,487	42°26′45″N 21°2′17″E
Viti	Viti	Vitina	Vitia	Gjilan	4,924	5,780	42°18′10″N 21°22′38″E
Vushtrri	Vushtrri	Vučitrn	Vushtrria	Mitrovica	26,964	29,276	42°49′20″N 20°58′0″E

== See also ==
- Administrative divisions of Kosovo
- List of populated places in Kosovo
