= 2011–12 Football Superleague of Kosovo =

Raiffeisen Superliga
- Season: 2011–12
- Champions: Prishtina; 9th title
- Relegated: KEK, Gjilani, Lepenci

2011–12 Raiffeisen Superliga was the 13th (Note: This season was the 13th season under the name Football Superleague of Kosovo, the 19th season of top-tier football in Kosovo and the 65th season of football in Kosovo overall.) season of top-tier football in Kosovo.

== Stadiums and locations ==
Locations of the 2011–12 Football Superleague of Kosovo teams

Team	Club home city	Stadium	Stadium capacity
KF Besa Pejë	Peć	Stadiumi Shahin Haxhiislami	8.500
KF Drenica	Skenderaj	Stadiumi Bajram Aliu	3.000
FC Drita	Gjilan	Stadiumi i qytetit (Gjilan) (Note: The two teams, Drita and Gjilan, which use this stadium together with their fans, have named the stadium with different names. Drita and their fans call the stadium as Selami Osmani-Bezi Stadium, while Gjilan and their fans call the stadium as Agim Ramadani Stadium, but officially the stadium is called Gjilan City Stadium.)	15.000
SC Gjilani	Gjilan	Stadiumi i qytetit (Gjilan)	15.000
KF Hysi	Podujevo	Stadiumi Merdare	2.000
KF KEK	Obilić	Stadiumi Agron Rama	15.000
KF Lepenci	Kaçanik	Stadiumi i qytetit (Kaçanik)	5.000
KF Liria	Prizren	Stadiumi Përparim Thaçi	15.000
FC Prishtina	Pristina	Fadil Vokrri Stadium	16.200
KF Trepça	Mitrovica	Stadiumi Olimpik Adem Jashari	29.000
KF Trepça'89	Mitrovica	Stadiumi Riza Lushta	7.000
KF Vëllaznimi	Gjakova	Stadiumi i qytetit (Gjakova)	6.000

== League table ==
Pos	Team	Pld	W	D	L	GF	GA	GD	Pts	Relegation
1	Prishtina (C)	33	19	8	6	63	31	+32	65	
2	Trepça'89	33	17	10	6	54	29	+25	61	
3	Vëllaznimi	33	15	10	8	43	38	+5	55	
4	Besa	33	13	9	11	46	40	+6	48	
5	Hysi	33	14	5	14	50	41	+9	47	
6	Drita	33	13	8	12	44	42	+2	47	
7	Drenica	33	13	7	13	42	32	+10	46	
8	Liria	33	13	5	15	44	50	−6	44	
9	Trepça	33	12	7	14	39	44	−5	43	
10	Lepenci (R)	33	11	9	13	35	42	−7	42	Relegation to 2012–13 Liga e Parë
11	KEK (R)	33	7	7	19	38	66	−28	28	Relegation to 2012–13 Liga e Parë
12	Gjilani (R)	33	6	5	22	25	68	−43	23	Relegation to 2012–13 Liga e Parë

Source: Football Federation of Kosovo (in Albanian), Tabelle auf ffk-kosova.com
Rules for classification: 1st points; 2nd head-to-head points; 3rd head-to-head goal difference; 4th overall wins; 5th goal difference; 6th goals scored
(C) Champions; (R) Relegated

== Results ==
=== Matches 1–22 ===
Home \ Away	BES	DRE	DRI	GJI	HYS	KEK	LEP	LIR	PRI	TRE	T89	VLZ
Besa		2–0	3–0	3–1	0–0	1–1	2–0	1–0	1–2	3–1	0–0	1–0
Drenica	1–2		1–1	2–1	3–0	2–1	1–0	2–0	1–0	0–0	2–2	1–2
Drita	5–1	2–1		2–0	3–1	2–0	0–0	2–0	0–3	1–2	2–1	0–0
Gjilani	2–1	1–0	0–1		0–3	2–4	2–1	2–1	1–1	1–0	0–0	2–4
Hysi	1–1	1–0	1–2	0–0		4–0	1–1	3–0	4–1	2–0	1–0	3–1
KEK	1–1	3–1	3–1	2–0	0–1		0–2	1–1	0–1	1–2	1–1	0–1
Lepenci	0–0	0–0	2–1	1–0	1–0	2–0		2–1	0–2	2–1	1–1	0–1
Liria	1–0	2–1	2–3	4–1	2–1	0–2	2–0		1–0	2–0	2–0	0–1
Prishtina	3–0	0–2	2–1	1–1	1–0	0–0	3–1	2–0		4–1	2–1	4–1
Trepça	1–0	1–2	1–1	1–1	3–0	1–0	2–0	2–0	0–0		1–2	0–0
Trepça'89	4–2	1–0	0–0	1–0	1–0	2–1	1–0	2–2	1–0	2–1		5–0
Vëllaznimi	0–0	2–0	2–1	1–0	1–1	3–0	3–0	1–1	2–2	2–1	1–1	

Legend: Blue = home team win; Yellow = draw; Red = away team win.

=== Matches 23–33 ===
Home \ Away	BES	DRE	DRI	GJI	HYS	KEK	LEP	LIR	PRI	TRE	T89	VLZ
Besa		1–1	0–0	2–0			6–0	3–1				3–0
Drenica				4–1		4–0	3–0	3–0		0–0		
Drita		1–0		1–2	2–1		1–0	3–4				0–0
Gjilani					0–3	2–3			1–5	0–4	0–4	
Hysi	1–0	2–1				4–0			2–3	3–4	3–1	
KEK	1–5		0–0				5–6	1–1				3–2
Lepenci				4–0	4–0				1–1	2–0	0–0	
Liria				3–1	3–2		0–0		1–3		3–2	
Prishtina	5–1	1–1	2–0			5–2				0–0		4–2
Trepça	2–0		4–3			2–1		1–3				0–3
Trepça'89	5–0	2–1	3–2			4–1			1–0	3–0		
Vëllaznimi		0–1		1–0	2–1		2–2	2–1			0–0	

Legend: Blue = home team win; Yellow = draw; Red = away team win.
