= Kaçanik =

Coordinates: 42°14′48″N 21°15′19″E

Kaçanik: Kaçanik or Kaçaniku (Albanian) Kačanik or Качаник (Serbian)
- Town and Municipality
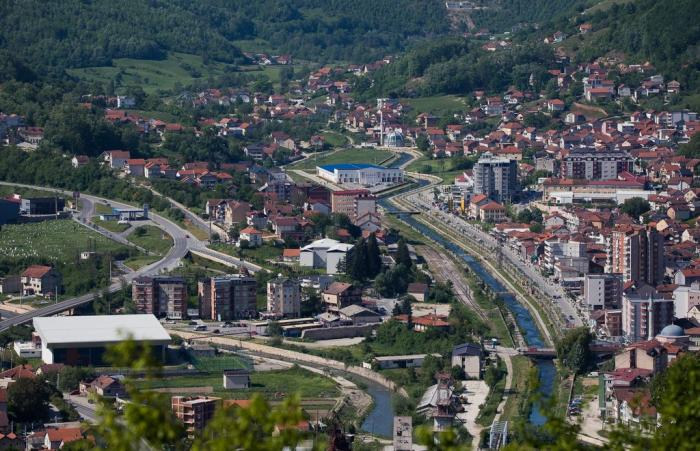
- Bob & Kaçanik

- Flag Emblem
- Interactive map of Kaçanik
- Location within Kosovo
- Country: Kosovo
- District: District of Ferizaj

Government
  - Mayor: Sabedin Vishi (PDK)

Area
  - Town and Municipality: 220 km^{2} (85 sq mi)
- Elevation: 478 m (1,568 ft)

Population (2024)
  - Town and Municipality: 27,716
  - Density: 130/km^{2} (330/sq mi)
  - Urban: 9,653
  - Ethnicity: 99.85% Albanians; 0.15% Other
- Demonym(s): Albanian: Kaçanikas (m), Kaçanikase (f)
- Time zone: UTC+1 (CET)
  - Summer (DST): UTC+2 (CEST)
- Postal code: 71000
- Country code: +383 (0) 290
- Vehicle registration: 05
- Regional road: R115
- Regional road: R116
- Regional road: R122
- Regional road: R303
- National road: N2
- Motorway: R6
- International E-road: E65
- Website: https://kacanik.rks-gov.net

Kaçanik (Albanian definite form: Kaçaniku) or Kačanik (Serbian Cyrillic: Качаник, pronounced [kâtʃaniːk]), is a town and municipality located in the Ferizaj District of southern Kosovo. According to the 2024 census, Kaçanik’s urban population, including the Bob, is approximately 10,000 while the municipality as a whole has 27,742 inhabitants.The municipality covers an area of 220 km^{2} (85 sq mi), including the town of Kaçanik and total of 31 settlements.

== Name ==
The founder of the town Koxha Sinan Pasha called the town Kaçaniku.

In 1660, Ottoman writer and traveller Evliya Çelebi visited Kosovo and wrote that the town's name derived from the Ottoman Turkish word kaçanlar in reference to a group of Albanian bandits that operated in Üsküb and used the region of Kaçanik as a hideout.

== History ==
=== Early history ===
The region of Kaçanik was one of the pathways, which were employed during Central European (akin to the Lusatian culture) migrations in the southern Balkans between 1200 and 1150 BCE. Roman era monuments include an altar that dates to 158–9 CE and is dedicated to a deity named Andinus (Deo Andino). The name Andinus appears among the central Illyrian and Dalmatian names, but the worship of Andinus seems to have been a local cult of southwestern Dardania as it doesn't appear in other parts of Illyria or the Roman Empire.

=== Middle Ages ===
After 9th century part of kingdom Raška and empire Serbia. Kaçanik was captured by the Ottomans in the 1420s. At that time Kaçanik was only a village registered by the Ottomans in 1455 defter as nahiyah.

Kaçanik was founded by Koca Sinan Pasha, who erected a tower, the town mosque which exists even today, a public kitchen for the poor (imaret), a school near the mosque, two hane (inns similar to caravanserais), one hammam (Turkish bathhouse), the town fortress called Llanishta Fortress and a few mills on the Lepenci river.

Kaçanik became known administratively as a town by the end of the 16th century, and up to year 1891 it was a part of the Ottoman Sanjak of Üsküb, which again belonged to the Kosovo Vilayet of the Ottoman Empire.

=== Modern ===
On January 2, 1690 Albanian insurgents participated in a battle on the side of the Austrian forces fought against the Ottomans at the Valley of Kaçanik.

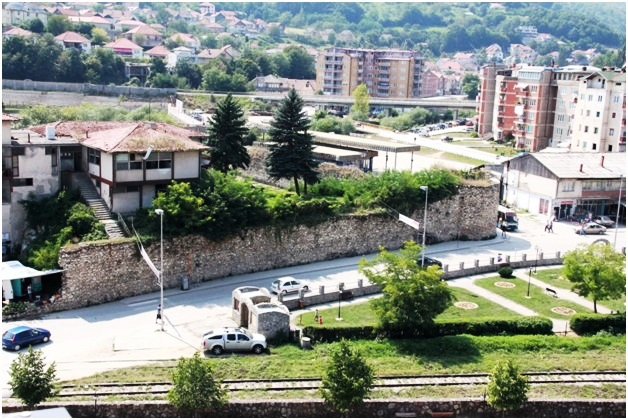
View of Kaçanik

In 1878, Kaçanik was intended to become a part of the Principality of Bulgaria according to the Treaty of San Stefano, but per the Treaty of Berlin it was returned to the Ottomans.

During the Albanian Revolt of 1910, the area of Kacanik was the battlefield between Ottoman and Albanian forces.

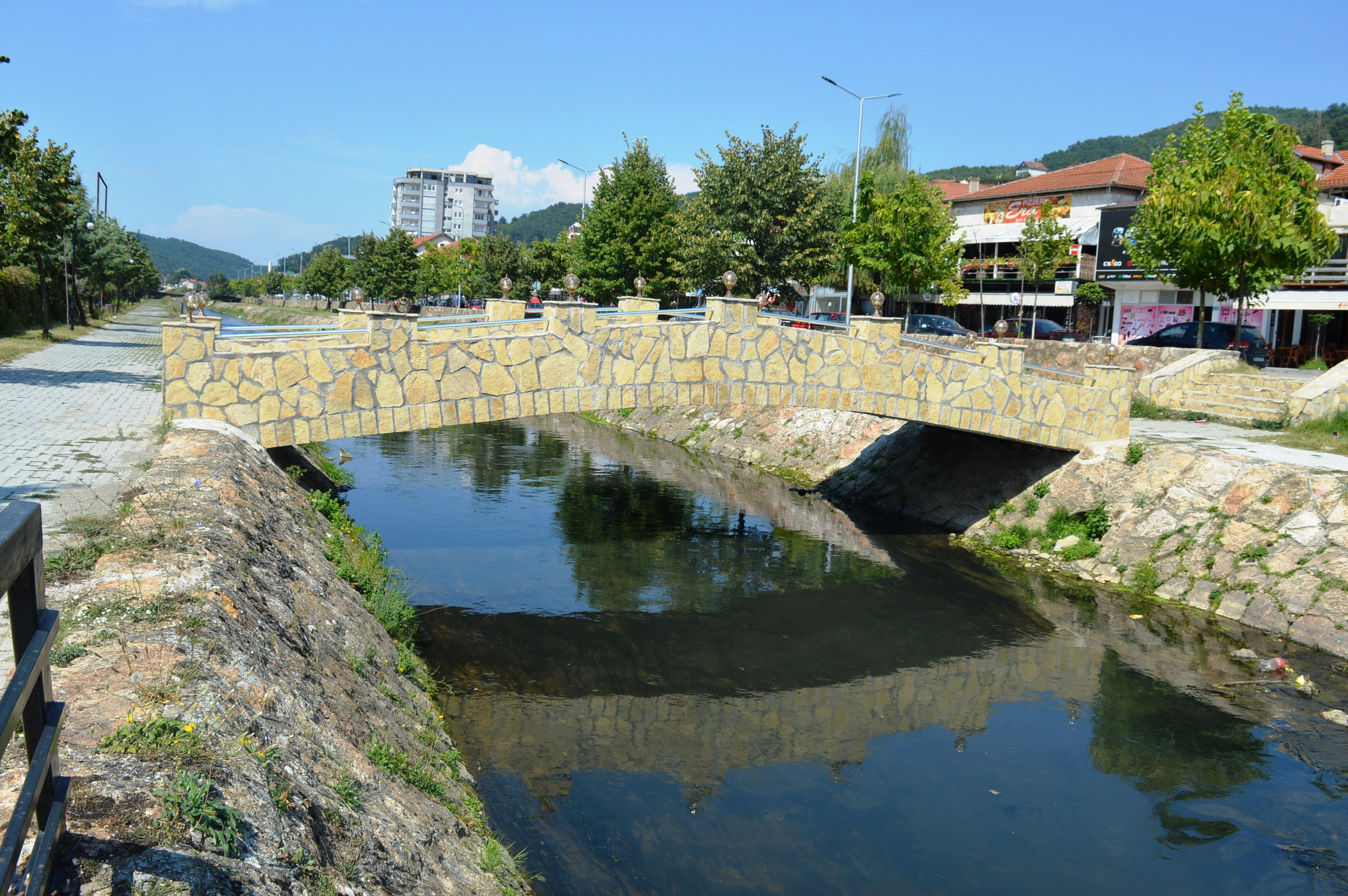
Kaçanik 2018

After 1912 the town became part of the Kingdom of Serbia, and after 1918 part of Kingdom of Serbs, Croats and Slovenes (the first incarnation of Yugoslavia). From 1929 to 1941 Kaçanik was part of the Vardar Banovina of the Kingdom of Yugoslavia.

During World War II, from 1941 to 1945, the town became part of the Kingdom of Bulgaria. Albanians looted and demolished the Serbian church in the village.

In 1990, after the suspension of Kosovo's autonomy, the members of the Kosovan assembly gathered in the town and adopted the Kaçanik Constitution, based on which the Republic of Kosova was proclaimed in 1991.

During the Kosovo War, Yugoslav forces including the army, police and paramilitary groups carried out operations in the town that led to high numbers of civilian casualties and mass flights of civilians from Kaçanik.

== Geography ==
Kaçanik is located in southeastern Kosovo, by the border with North Macedonia. It is situated in the Kaçanik Gorge, between the Sharr Mountains to the west and the Karadak Mountains to the east. Kaçanik lies along the Nerodime and Lepenc rivers, which they joined in the south of the town to continue to North Macedonia. The municipality borders the municipalities of Ferizaj to the north, Viti to the east, Hani i Elezit to the south, and Shtërpcë to the west.

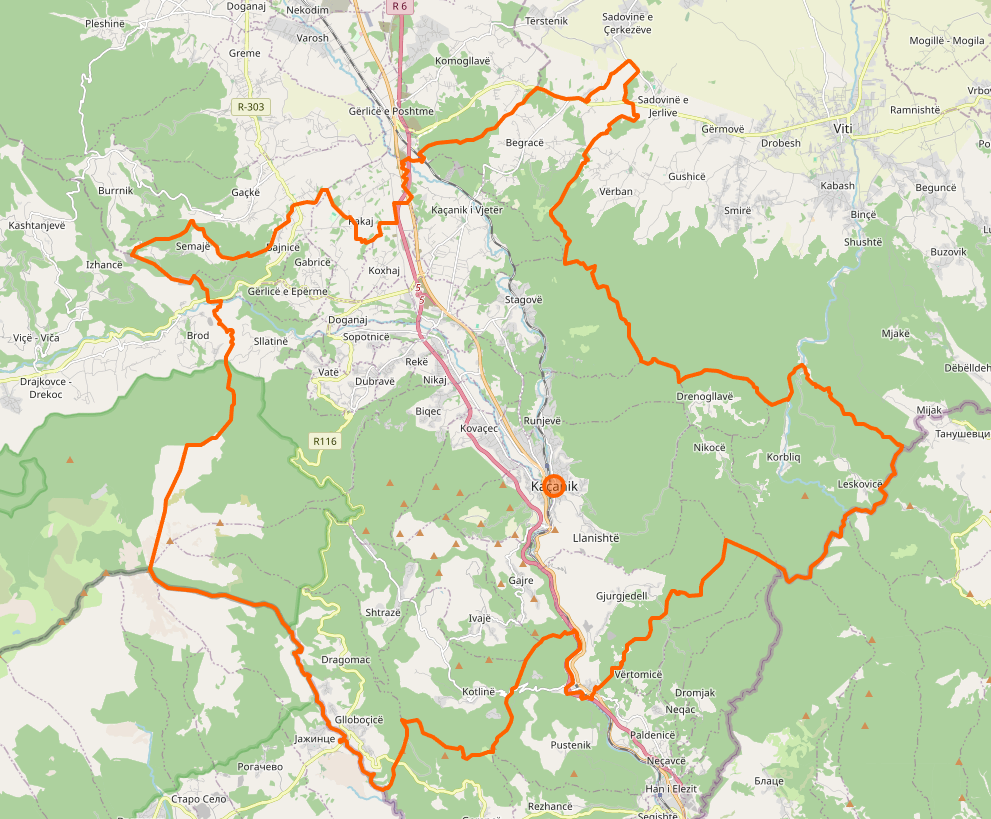
Map of Municipality of Kaçanik

== Demographics ==
Municipal historical population
Year	Pop.	±% p.a.
1948	16,318	—
1953	18,128	+2.13%
1961	19,735	+1.07%
1971	23,978	+1.97%
1981	31,072	+2.63%
1991	38,010	+2.04%
2011	33,409	−0.64%
2024	27,716	−1.43%

According to the last official census done in 2024, the urban population of Kaçanik has 9,653 inhabitants, while the municipality has 27,716 inhabitants. The municipality is ethnically homogeneous Albanian.

== Economy ==
The municipality is known for the production of construction materials at several area companies. There are also many cultivated farmlands and areas suited for the development of farms, apiculture, arboriculture as well as various craftsman and artisans. The downtown area is home to a bus station, a small radio station, the remains of a Turkish fort, several streets lined with shops, banks, several restaurants, and a weekly farmers market for produce, livestock and housewares.

Kaçanik has an old tradition in private manufactures, especially when it comes to the production of calcareous stone, wood for construction purposes and other services and art

== Villages ==
B	Bob / Bobi	Bajnicë	Biqec/Biçecë	Begracë/ Begracë	
D	Doganaj	Drenogllavë	Dubravë	Duraj	
E	Elezaj				
G	Gabrricë	Gajre	Gërlicë e Epërme	Glloboçicë/Qafëshqipja	
Gj	Gjurgjedell				
I	Ivajë/Ivaja				
K	Kaçanik i Vjetër	Korbliq/Kurbali	Kotlië	Kovaçec	Koxhaj
LL	Llanishte (neighbourhood)				
N	Nikaj	Nikoc			
R	Rekë/Reka	Runjevë			
S	Semajë	Sllatinë	Soponicë	Stagovë	Stazhë
V	Vataj-Dubravë				

- 1 Urban settlement (the town of Kaçanik)
- 30 Rural settlements (villages)

== Gallery ==
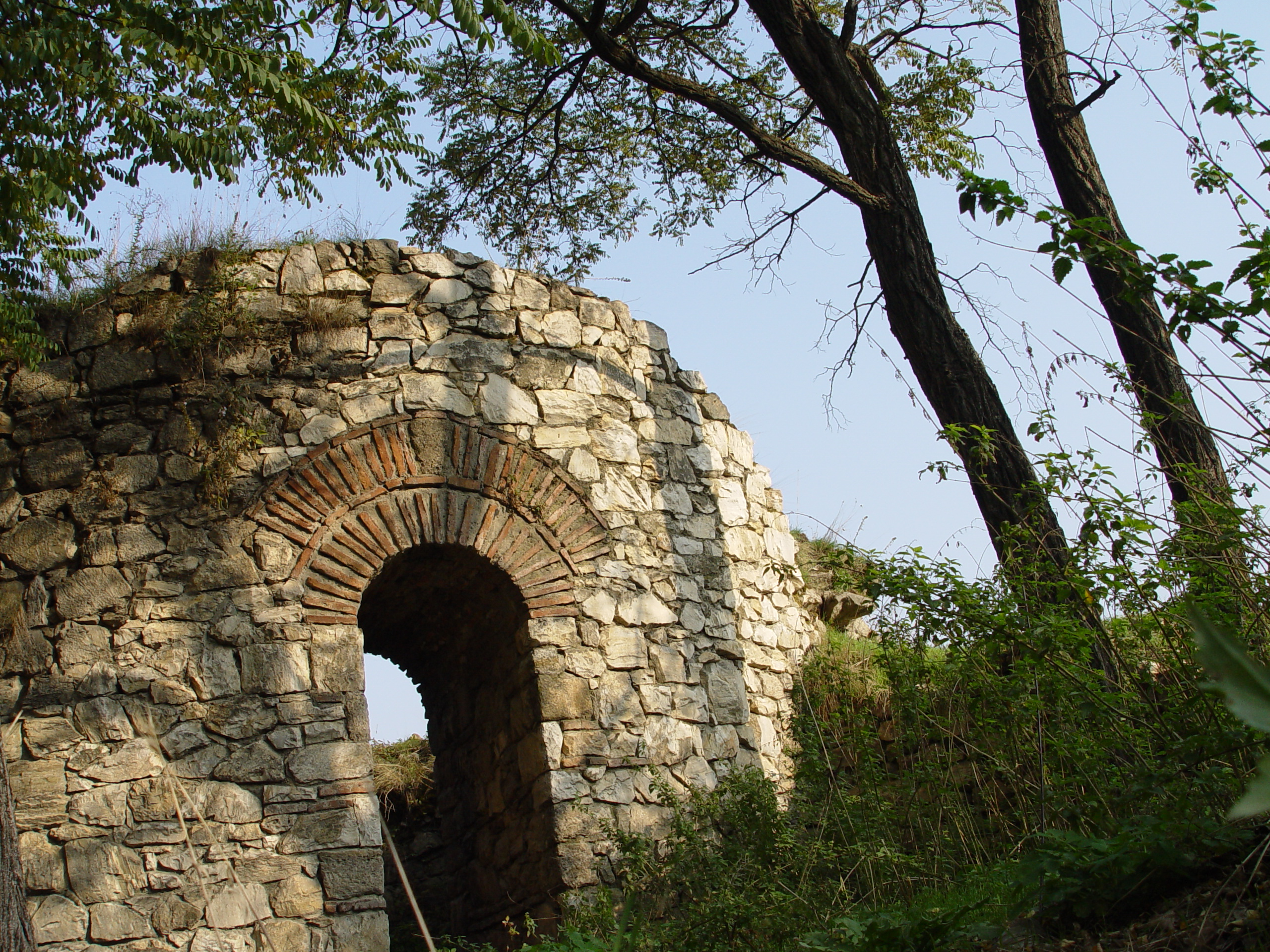
Kalaja e Kaçanikut

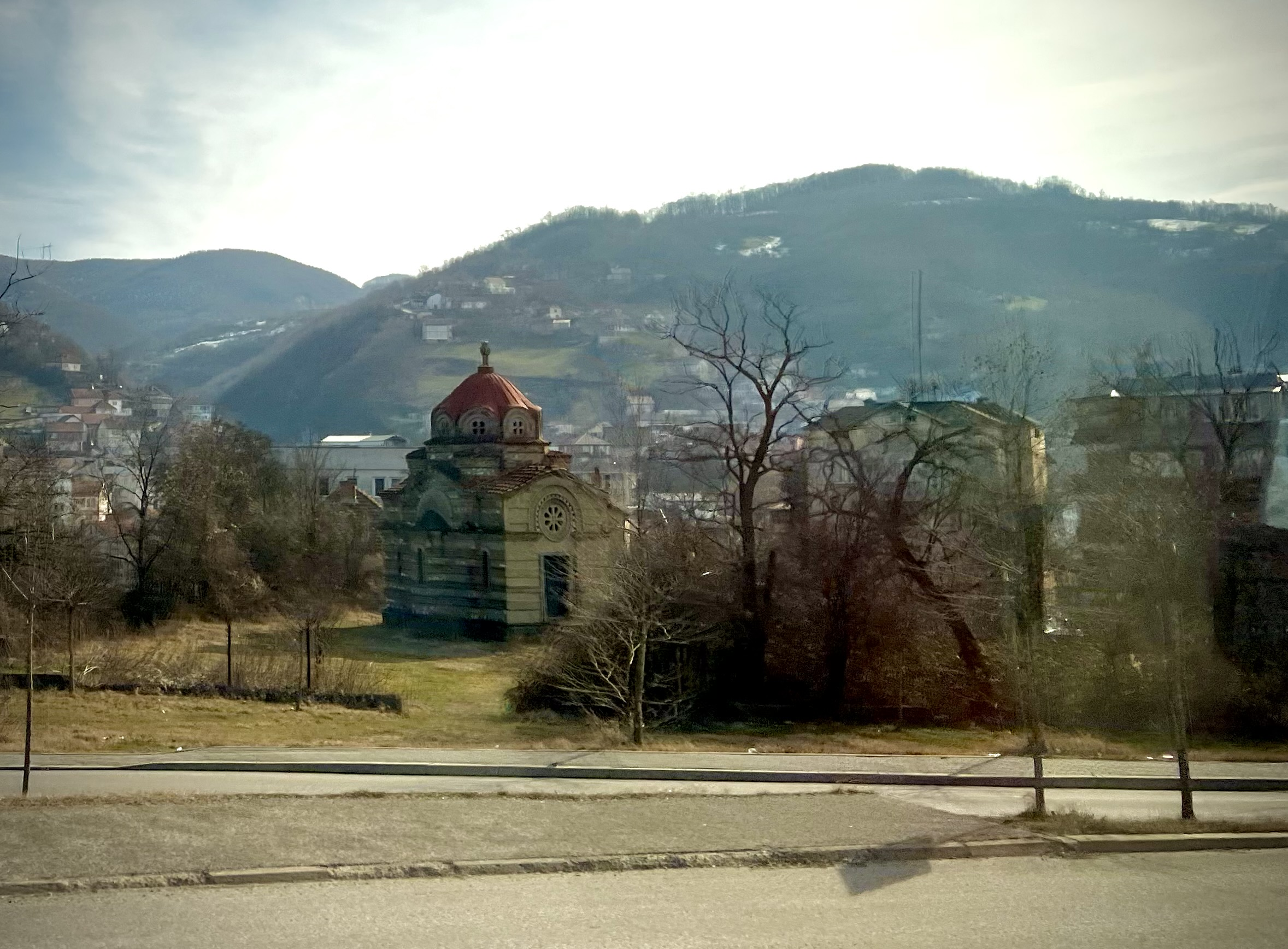
Kisha e Nikës (Orthodox Church)

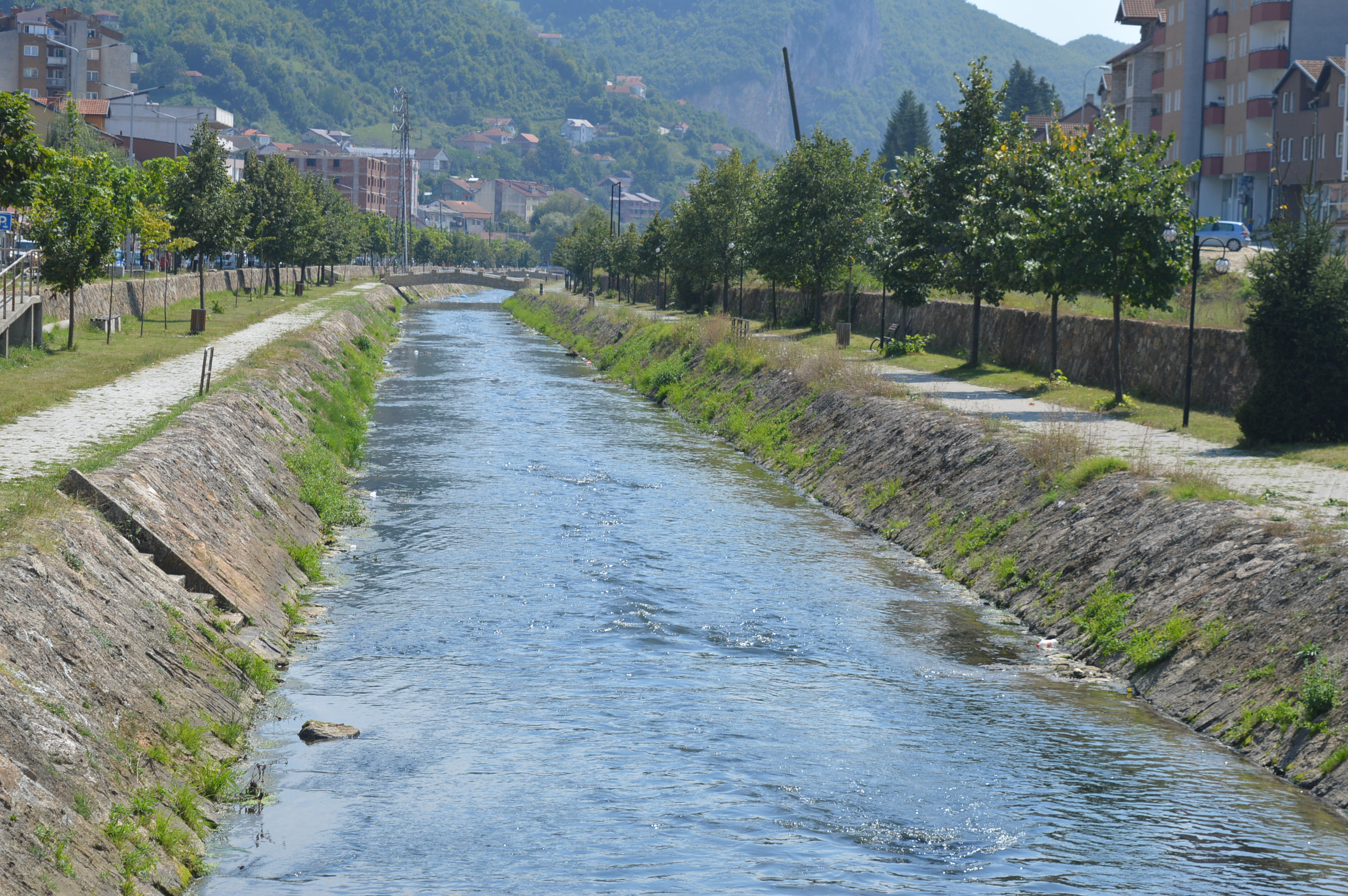
Nerodime river

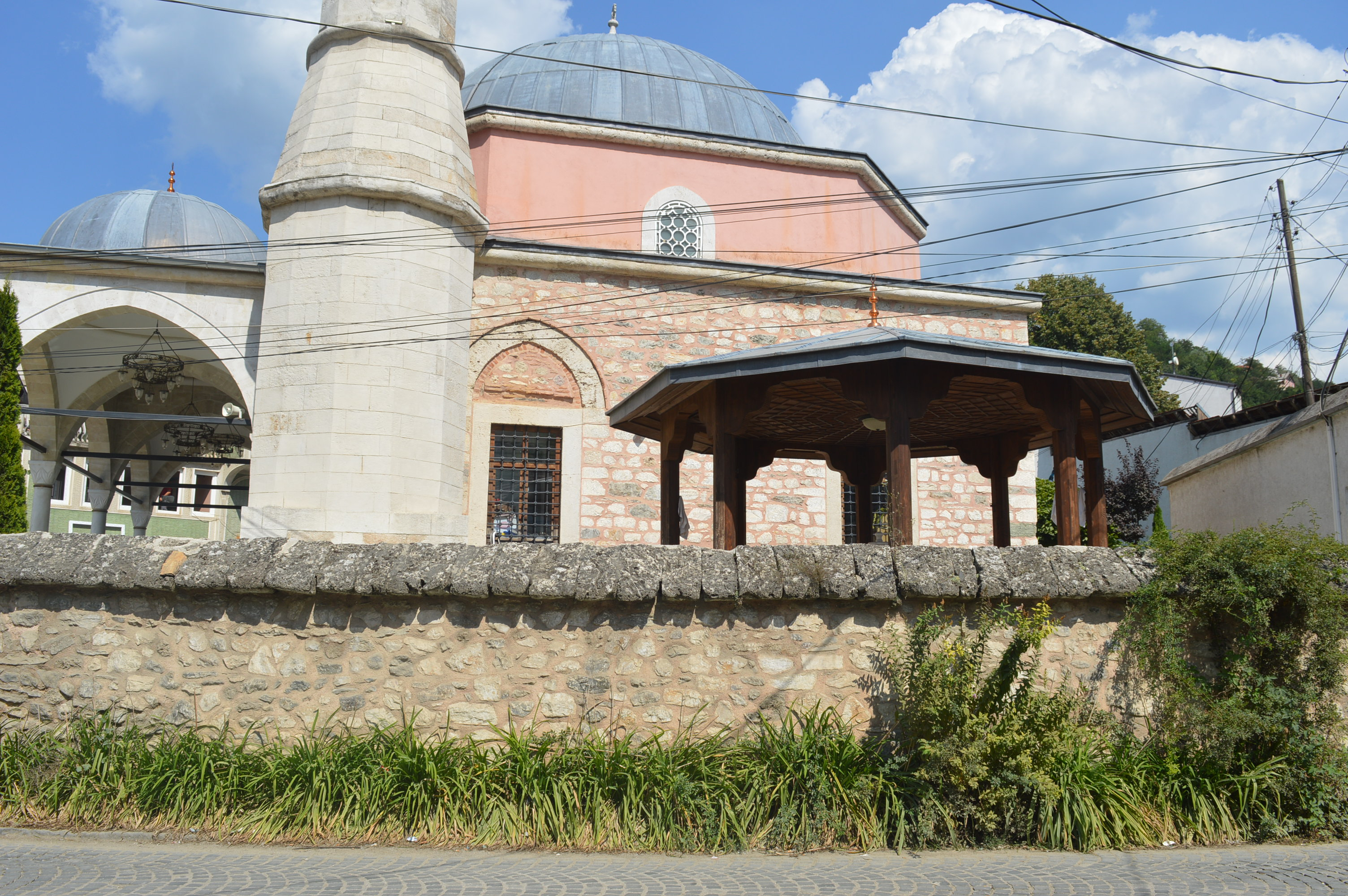
Koxha Sinan Pasha (Mosque)

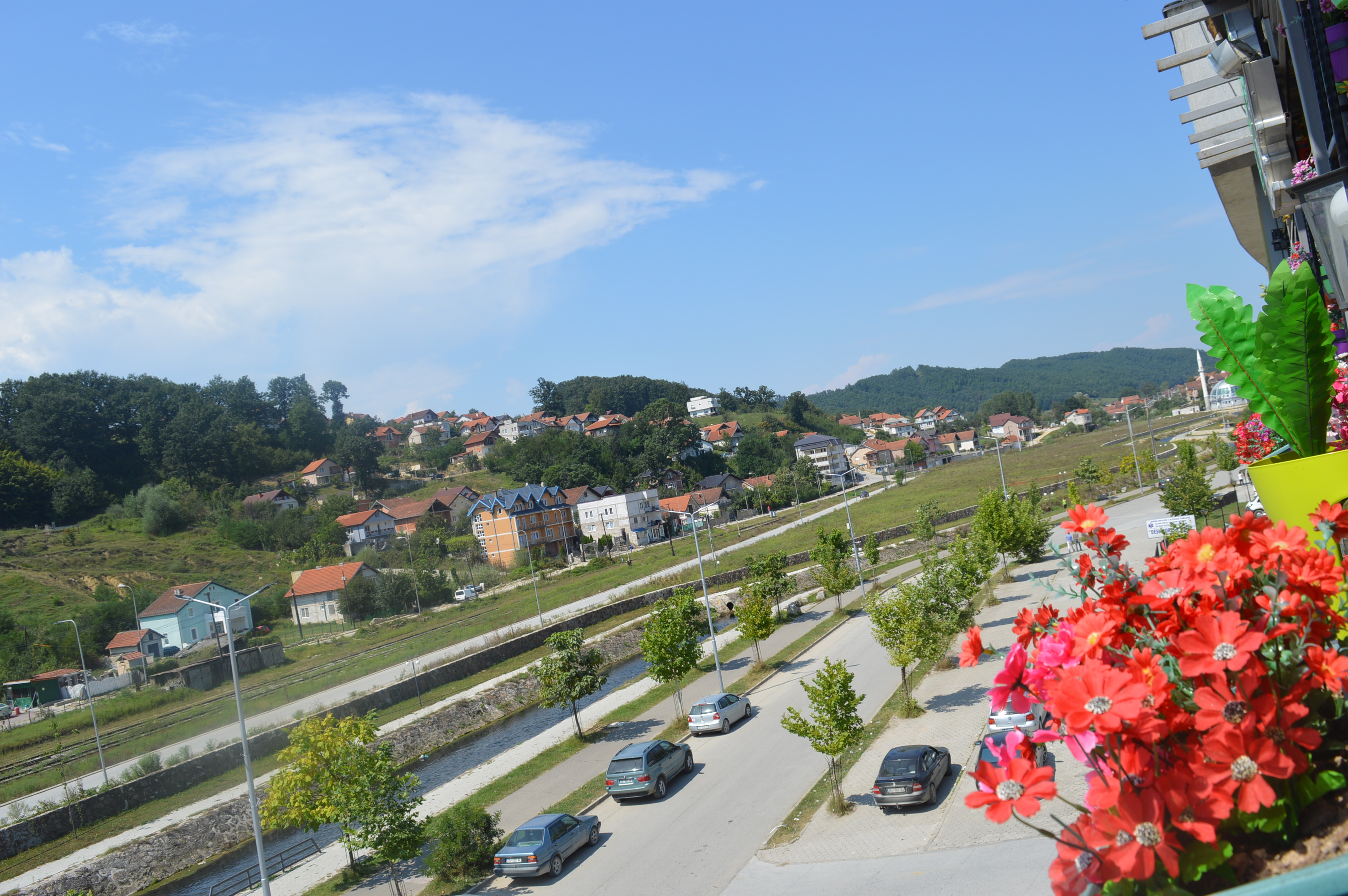
Uptown city center (Kaçanik)

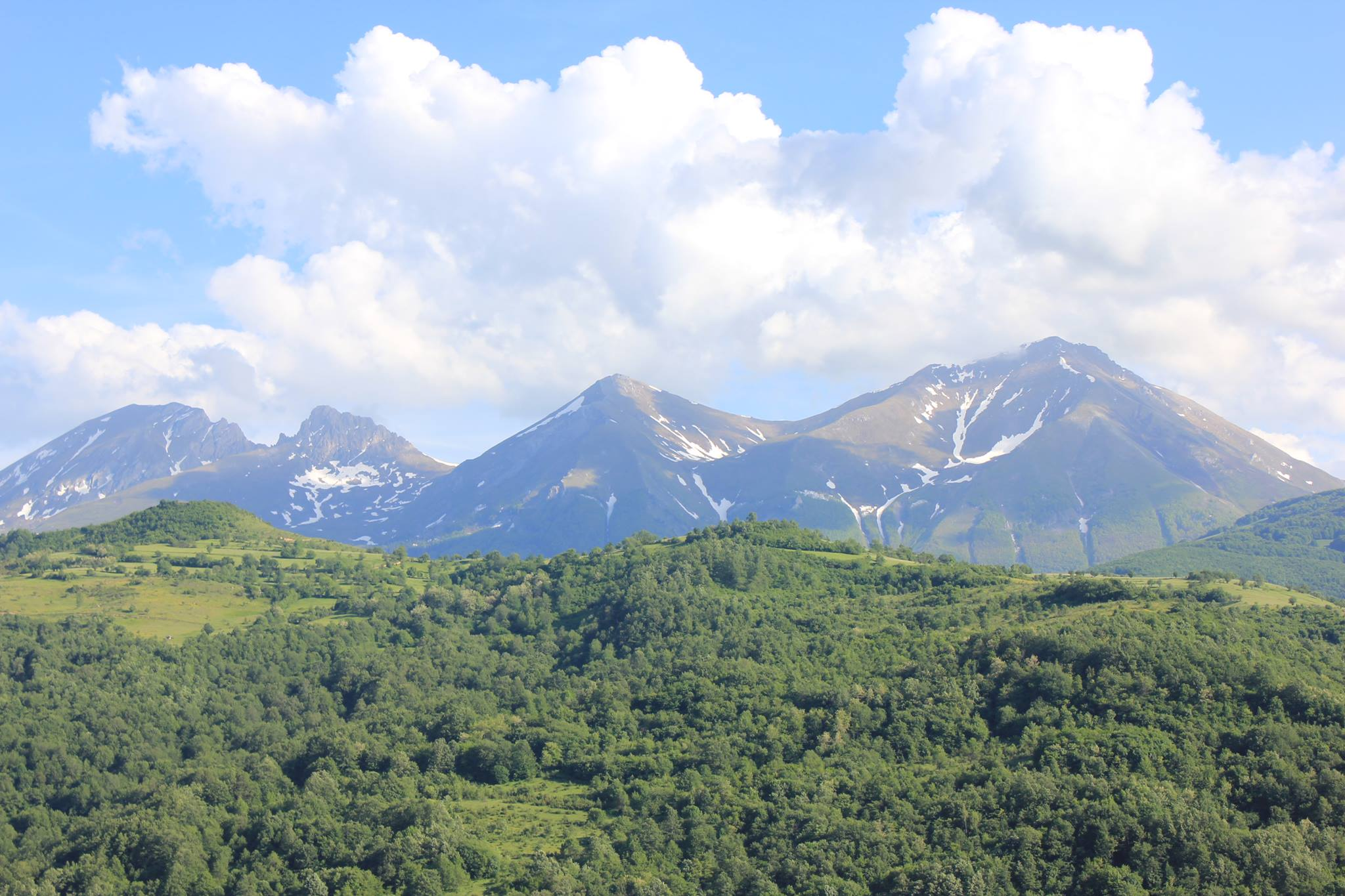
"Sharr Mountains" National Park

== Culture ==
=== Sport ===
==== Sports teams ====
KF Lepenci is the men's football club in the town and they play their home matches at Besnik Begunca Stadium. KFF Bazeli 2015 is the women's football club in the town and they play in the top level of the women's football league in Kosovo.

Club	Sport	Founded	League	Venue
KF Lepenci	Football	1945/1957	Second League Group B	Besnik Begunca Stadium
KFF Bazeli 2015	Football(Women)	2015	Kosovo Women's Football League	Besnik Begunca Stadium

== Notable people ==
- Ag Apolloni, writer
- Adem Salihaj, politician
- Arben Zharku, film producer
- Driton Selmani, visual artist
- Etnik Brruti, footballer
- Jetmir Topalli, footballer
- Jeton Neziraj, playwright
- Ramize Gjebrea (1923–1944), World War II partisan, mother from Kaçanik
- Sara Maliqi, footballer
- Triumf Riza, police officer
- Veton Tusha, footballer
- Ylber Hysa, historian
- Idriz Seferi, fighter
- Albin Krasniqi, footballer

== See also ==
- Musa Kesedžija
- Kaçanik Gorge
- Sharr Mountains National Park
- R 6 Motorway
- Sinan Pasha Mosque (Kaçanik)
- Bob, Kaçanik
