= KF Lepenci =

Football club in Kosovo

Lepenci
- Full name: Klubi Futbollistik Lepenci
- Nickname: Fikshat
- Short name: LEP; Lepenci
- Founded: 1945; 81 years ago
- Ground: Besnik Begunca Stadium
- Chairman: Besnik Ilazi
- Manager: Astrit Fazliu
- League: Kosovo Second League
- 2025–26: Kosovo Second League, 2nd of 18 (promoted)
- Website: http://kflepenci.com Official website
Home colours	Away colours

Klubi Futbollistik Lepenci (Gheg Albanian pronunciation: [ˈklubi futboɫisˈtik lɛˈpɛntsi]), commonly referred to as Lepenci, is a football club based in Kaçanik, Kosovo. The club competes in the second league, the third tier of the Kosovar football league system

== History ==
Football in Kaçanik was played late in 1942–43 during the second world war and shortly after the second world war ended the club KF Lepenci was found, and this in 1945. KF Lepenci was given the name from the river in Kaçanik, Lepenac. In 1955, Lepenci participated in the qualifying competitions of the Pristina Regional League, affiliated and assured membership in the Kosovo football elite, where they also played most of the sporting events.

In the 2011–12 season of Football Superleague of Kosovo, which is the top football league in the country, Lepenci got promoted and played for the first time in the club history in the league but got relegated to the second league, First Football League of Kosovo at the end of the season.

It is ranked 28th in the all-time table of the Football Superleague of Kosovo and is one of the oldest, and biggest club in Kosovo.

== Supporters ==
Fikshat
- Founded: 1999; 27 years ago
- Type: Ultras club
- Location: Kaçanik, Kosovo
- Arena: Besnik Begunca Stadium

Fikshat are the clubs ultras group and was found in 1999. As the clubs ultras, they are the 12th player and is familiar in all Albanian lands in Kosovo and other places for their atmosphere. Flags, drums and other anime are the regular decor for the days when the club plays. Fikshat are one of the biggest ultras group in Kosovo.

== Stadium ==
The club plays their home matches in Besnik Begunca Stadium. The stadium is named after Besnik Begunca, who fought for the Kosovo Liberation Army and was killed in 1999 by Serb forces. They named the stadium after him to honor him.

== Colors and crest ==
The colors of the club are red and black which are the national colors of Albania. The club's crest has the same look as the famous Spanish club FC Barcelona crest. It is red and black and in the middle it is written the club's name.

== Players ==
=== Current squad ===
As of 2017

Note: Flags indicate national team as defined under FIFA eligibility rules; some limited exceptions apply. Players may hold more than one non-FIFA nationality.

No.	Pos.	Nation	Player
—	GK	KOS	Berat Jakupi
—	GK	KOS	Driton Shurdhani
—	GK	KOS	Besfort Mjaku
—	DF	KOS	Liridon Guri
—	DF	KOS	Burhan Dema
—	DF	KOS	Enes Curri
—	DF	KOS	Etem Asllani
—	DF	KOS	Amet Mani
—	MF	KOS	Enis Krasniqi
—	MF	KOS	Sadat Krasniqi (captain)

No.	Pos.	Nation	Player
—	MF	KOS	Fatbardh Kuka
—	MF	KOS	Fisnik Dernjani
—	MF	PER	Benjamin Zamudio
—	MF	KOS	Astrit Dernjani
—	FW	KOS	Edon Axhami
—	FW	KOS	Albion Tenegja
—	FW	KOS	Qendrim Halili
—	FW	KOS	Shpejtim Muhaxheri
—	FW	KOS	Ramush Ademi

== Notable players ==
- Xhevdet Shabani (born 1986)
