= Llanishta Fortress =

Hilltop fortress in Kosovo

- Albanian: Kalaja e Llanishtës
- Llanishtë, near Kaçanik in Kosovo

Site information
- Owner: Kosovo
- Open to the public: Yes

Location
- Location within Kosovo
- Coordinates: 42°12′55″N 21°16′23″E

Llanishta Fortress (Albanian: Kalaja e Llanishtës) is the remains of a medieval fortress in Kosovo at a site know as the Vranjak.

== Overview ==
In an elevated region approximately 1 kilometre to the south of Kaçanik and at an altitude of 684 metres above sea level, lies the remains of a fort. This ancient structure is characterised by a wall that is roughly 1.7 metres (5 ft 7 in) thick and stands at a relative height of 2.5–3 metres (8 ft 2 in – 9 ft 10 in) (still preserved). The wall is constructed using unhewn field stones, which are connected together with lime mortar. It is worth noting that this wall is built directly upon the natural rock foundation.

As you ascend the hill, the wall continues to be visible for a distance of approximately 50-60 metres, aligning itself with the contours of the hill's topography (isohyps). Moreover, it establishes a connection with the village of Llanishta via a gentle passageway.

== See also ==
- List of fortifications in Kosovo
