= List of districts of Kosovo by Human Development Index =

Stats of Kosovar districts

This is a list of the seven districts of Kosovo by Human Development Index as of 2025 with data for the year 2023.

| Rank | District | HDI (2023) |
Very High human development
| 1 | District of Pristina | 0.806 |
| 2 | District of Mitrovica | 0.802 |
| 3 | District of Ferizaj | 0.801 |
High human development
| – | Kosovo (average) | 0.797 |
| 4 | District of Peja | 0.789 |
| 5 | District of Gjakova | 0.788 |
| 6 | District of Prizren | 0.785 |
| 7 | District of Gjilan | 0.778 |
