= Driton Selmani =

Kosovar visual artist (born 1987)

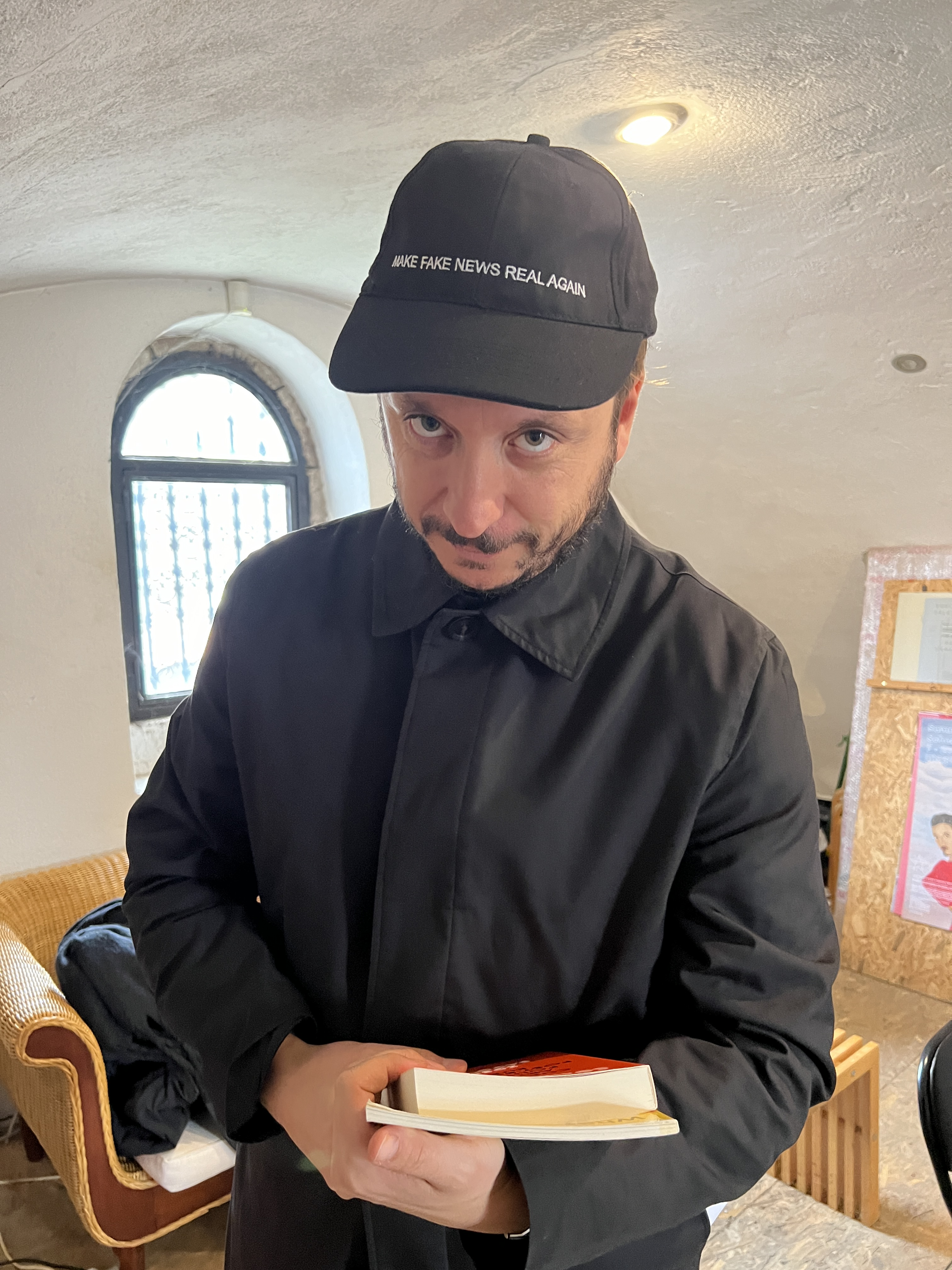
- Selmani in 2023
- Born: 8 February 1987; Kaçanik, Kosovo, Yugoslavia
- Education: Arts University Bournemouth
- Occupation: Artist
- Known for: Conceptual art, drawing, photography, painting, sculpture, ready-made artist
- Notable work: Love Letters (2018–2024); Manifesta 14 Prishtina
- Website: dritonselmani.com

Driton Selmani (born 8 February 1987) is a Kosovar contemporary visual artist whose practice spans across various media including installation, photography, text, and public art.

== Early life and education ==
Driton Selmani was born in Doganaj, Kaçanik, during a period marked by political unrest and conflict in the Balkans. Growing up in a post-socialist environment, his early life was influenced by the cultural and socio-political changes that took place during the dissolution of Yugoslavia and the subsequent Kosovo War.

Selmani pursued his education in visual arts in Bournemouth, United Kingdom, at the Arts University Bournemouth.

== Artistic practice ==
Selmani's artistic practice is characterized by its conceptual depth and versatility across different media. His work often blurs the boundaries between art and everyday life, challenging conventional perceptions of public and private spaces. A recurring theme in his work is the exploration of how history, memory, and identity are constructed and perceived, particularly within the context of Kosovo's complex political landscape. In a 2025 interview, he explained that his practice is deeply informed by the tensions of working in Kosovo and his choice to return from abroad after completing his MFA, situating the studio and local context as primary sites for his artistic thinking.

=== Site-specific projects and public art ===
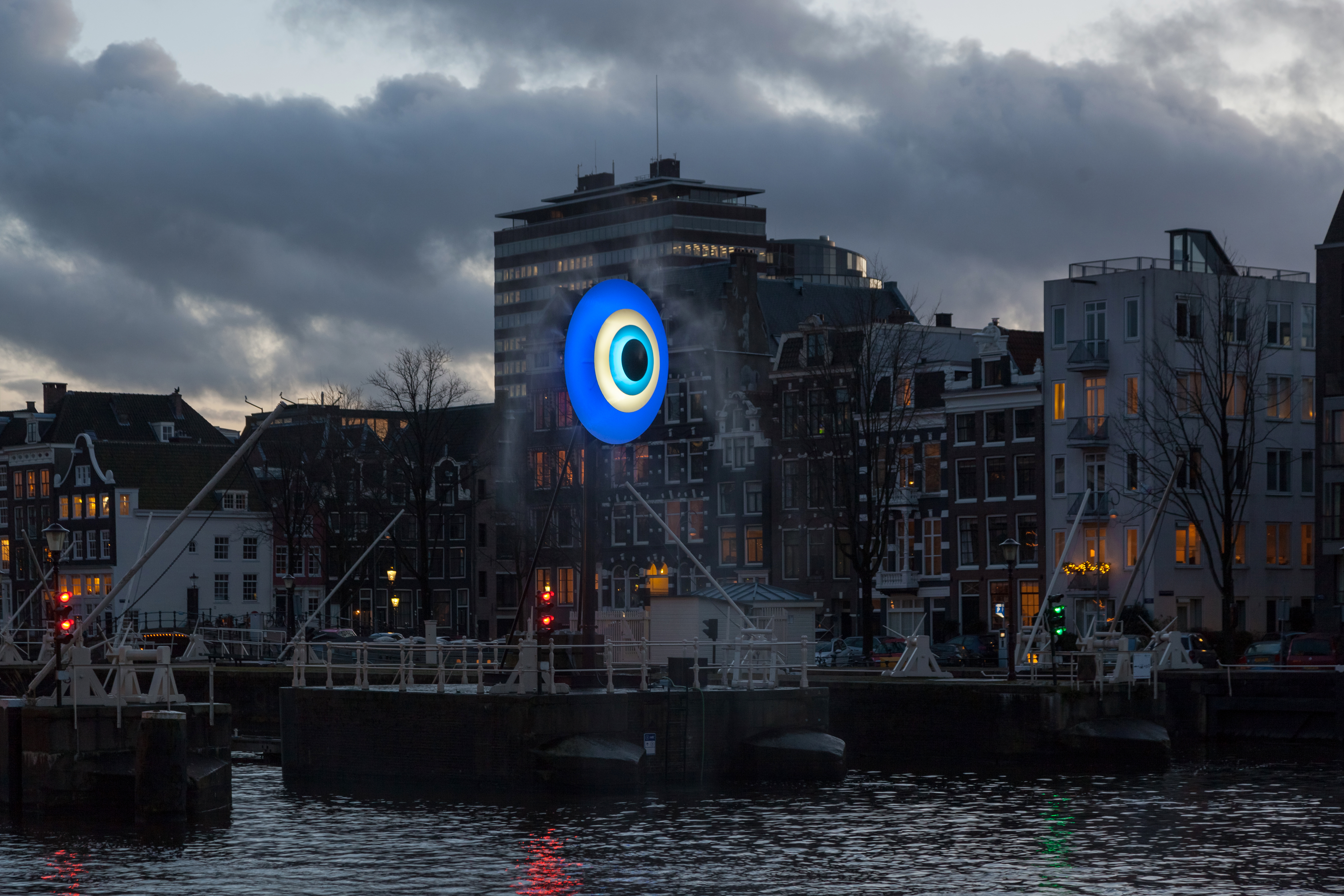
Eye to Eye (Amsterdam Light Festival, Netherlands)

One of his most prominent public artworks is "Eye to Eye" (2018), created for the Amsterdam Light Festival.

== Key exhibitions ==
Selmani's work has been exhibited in various international exhibitions. Some of his notable exhibitions include:

- Everything We Do Is Really, Really Brilliant (2023): This solo exhibition at Kahan Art in Vienna showcased Selmani's exploration of the intersection between public and private spaces.
- The Other Re-Imagine the Future (2023): Held at Kunsthaus Graz in Austria, this exhibition featured Selmani's work alongside other contemporary artists, exploring the theme of speculative futures.
- Manifesta 14 Prishtina (2022): a significant edition of the Manifesta Biennial, which took place in his home city of Pristina. His work in the biennial engaged with local narratives and the broader geopolitical context of the Balkans, further establishing his relevance in both regional and international art discourses.
- Nobody Saw This Coming (2025) at On Top Residency involved planting a palm tree as an artwork, which he described as a gesture of irony and humility towards nature that shifts artistic language from industrial materials to organic forms.

=== The Barking of The Clouds Does Not Hurt The Dogs ===
Held at MSU Skopje from 4 April 2022 to 25 February 2023.

== Love Letters on plastic bags ==
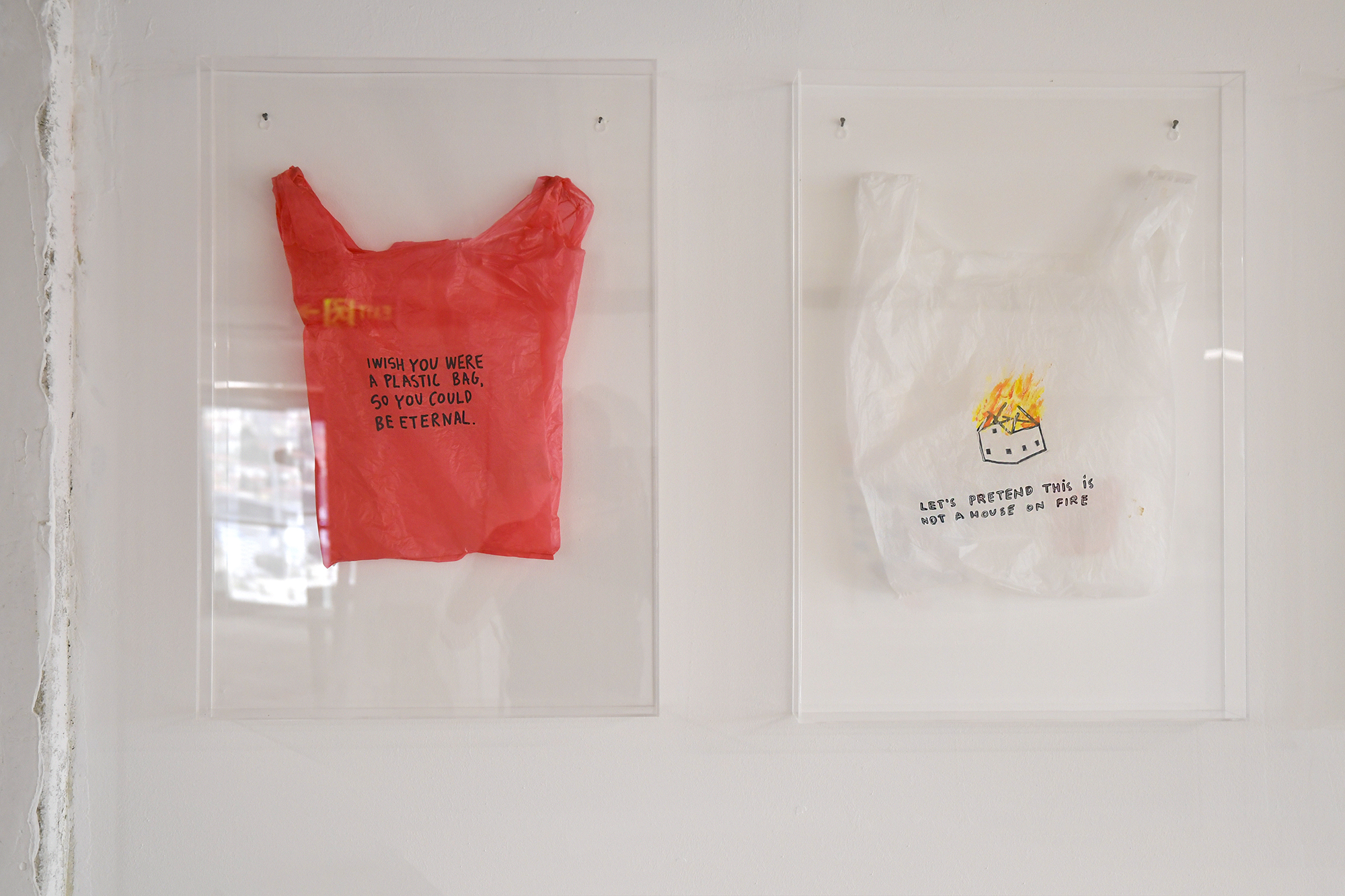
Love Letters, Manifesta 14

Since 2018, Driton Selmani has been developing an ongoing project in which he writes love letters on plastic bags. This work touches on themes such as politics, ecology, art, and philosophy.
