= Administrative divisions of Kosovo =

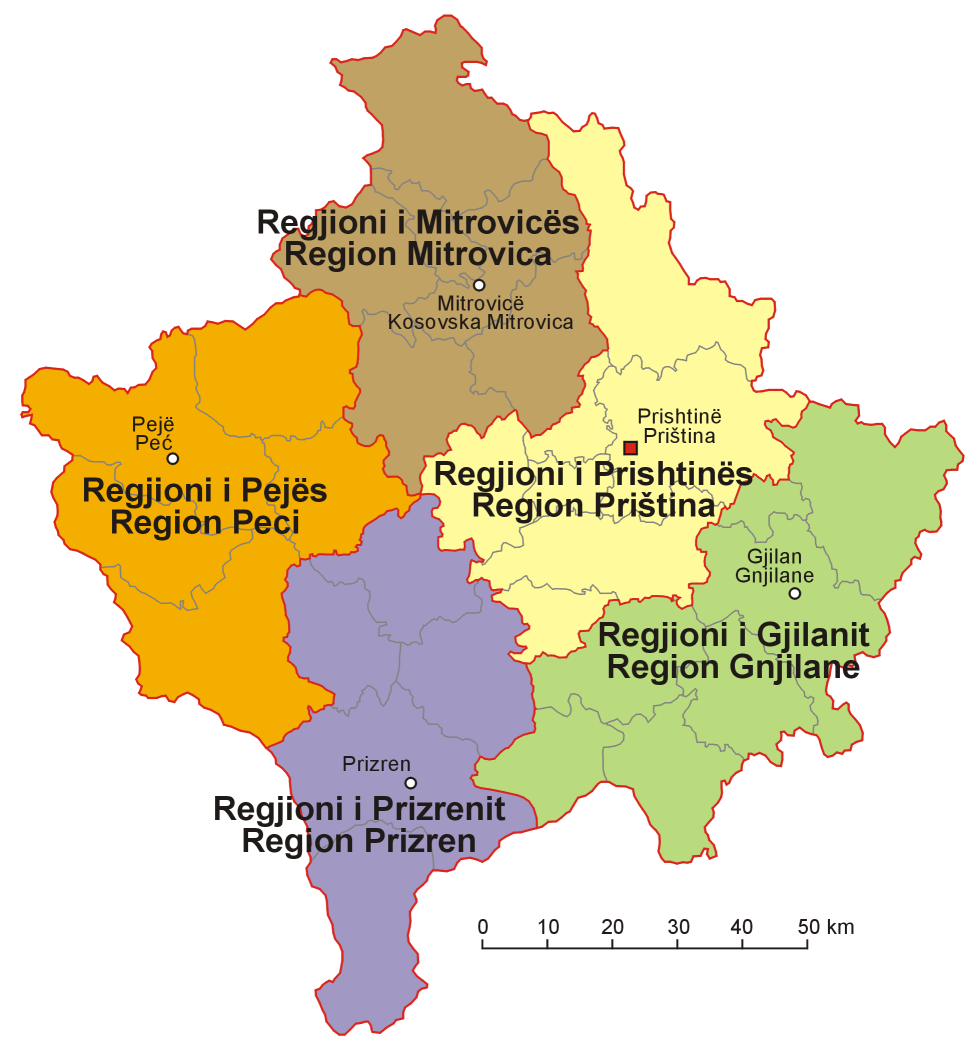
Five original UNMIK regions (1999–2008)

Administrative divisions of Kosovo are administrative divisions of the UN-administered Kosovo (1999–2008) and the Republic of Kosovo (since 2008).

== UN-administered Kosovo ==
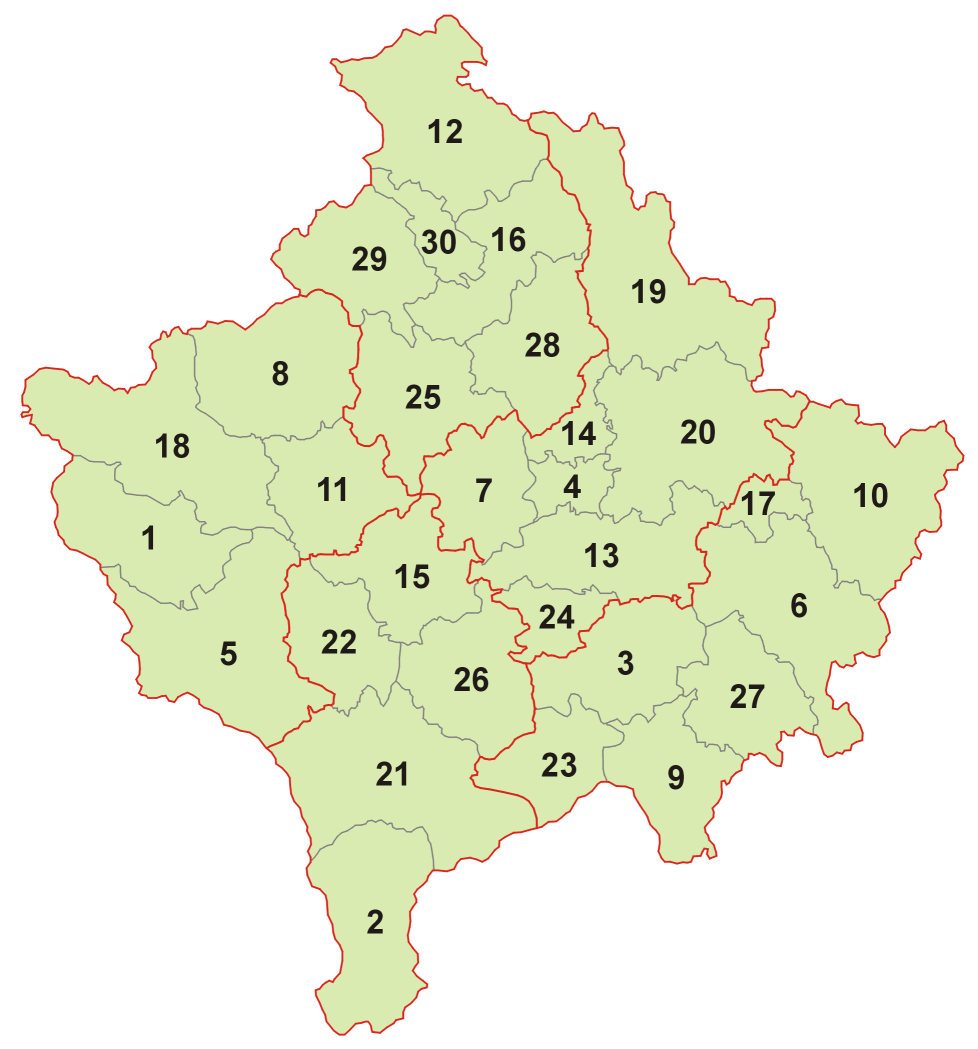
Municipalities within five original UNMIK regions (1999–2008)

Since 1999, the UN-administered Kosovo was divided into five UNMIK regions (centered in: Gjilan, Mitrovica, Peja, Pristina, Prizren), that were headed by regional administrators. In the same time, on the municipal level of administrative division, municipal administrators were also appointed, and in 2000 territorial scopes of all (at that time 30) municipalities in the UN-administered Kosovo were regulated by UNMIK.

UNMIK administrative divisions of Kosovo, that were introduced since 1999, were not always identical with previous administrative divisions, that existed in the Autonomous Province of Kosovo and Metohija.

== Republic of Kosovo ==
Since 2008, the Republic of Kosovo is administratively subdivided into seven districts (Albanian: rajone). They are further subdivided into 38 municipalities (Albanian: komuna).

Type	Quantity
Districts of Kosovo	7 (since 2008)
Municipalities of Kosovo	38 (since 2008)

== See also ==
- Districts of Kosovo
- Municipalities of Kosovo
- Cities and towns in Kosovo
- Populated places in Kosovo
