= Telephone numbers in Kosovo =

- Location of Kosovo (green) in Europe (dark grey)
- Country: Kosovo
- Continent: Europe
- Regulator: ARKEP / RAEPC
- Numbering plan type: Open
- Format: 04x xxx xxx
- Country code: 383
- International access: 00
- Long-distance: 0

Telephone numbers in Kosovo are administered by the Regulatory Authority of Electronic and Postal Communications (Albanian: Autoriteti Rregullativ i Komunikimeve Elektronike dhe Postare, ARKEP) of the Kosovo government.

== Country code ==
The International Telecommunication Union (ITU) has assigned country code 383 to Kosovo by an agreement between the authorities of Kosovo and Serbia in an EU-led dialogue. Its dialing code was initially expected to become effective on 1 January 2015, but it was postponed to the finalization of the agreement in late August 2015. With the agreement of the Administration of the Republic of Serbia, the Director of TSB has assigned the international codes to Kosovo. Kosovo is represented in ITU as Kosovo* which the designation is without prejudice to positions on status, and is in line with UNSCR 1244 and the ICJ Opinion on the Kosovo declaration of independence.

=== History ===
Following the breakup of the SFR Yugoslavia in 1992, which used country code 38, Kosovo used the code 381, which was granted to FR Yugoslavia and later used by Serbia. The code was used for fixed line telephone services, whereas for mobile phone networks, it used either the Monaco code 377 or the Slovenian code 386. The new country code, 383, began service in early 2017.

=== Reactions to 383 code allocation ===
The International Telecommunication Union "will not recognize Kosovo's independence", quote daily Koha Ditore, "as ITU will include the footnote on Kosovo" in the technical annexes. Kosovo's NISMA party leader Fatmir Limaj was quoted by KosovaPress agency to have said that with the agreement reached in Brussels, the Kosovo government "allowed the Serbian operator to work in Kosovo". Vice chairman of Kosovo's Vetëvendosje party, Shpend Ahmeti claimed that the agreement favored Serbia. "Telephone calls between cities in Serbia and cities in Kosovo will be treated as local calls. Serbia will preserve its assets in Kosovo and it will also have a license for Serb operators within Kosovo. For these favors, Serbia will allow Kosovo to have its own country code."

== Number format ==
=== Fixed-line telephony ===
District	Code	Municipalities covered by code
Ferizaj	0290	Ferizaj, Kaçanik, Štrpce, Hani i Elezit
Gjakova	0390	Gjakova, Deçan, Junik
Gjilan	0280	Gjilan, Kamenica, Viti, Novo Brdo
Mitrovica	028	Mitrovica, Vushtrri, Skenderaj, Zvečan, Leposavić, Zubin Potok
Peja	039	Peja, Istog, Klina
Pristina	038	Pristina, Gračanica, Kosovo Polje, Lipjan, Obiliq
Prizren	029	Prizren, Suva Reka, Rahovec, Dragash

=== Mobile telephony ===
Country code		Area code	Operators
383	also Monégasque 377 (still active occasionally)	044, 045, 046	Vala
383	also Slovenian 386 (still active occasionally)	043, 048, 049	IPKO
383	also Serbian 381 (connected to mts.rs)	047	mts d.o.o

=== Special short codes ===
Code	Service
112	Unified emergency number
192	Police
193	Fire brigade
194	Ambulance
0800 122 33	Public services
0800 123 45	Suicide hotline number

=== Number range ===
Number range	Usage	Host country
28	Landlines	Kosovo
29	Landlines	Kosovo
38	Landlines	Kosovo
39	Landlines	Kosovo
43	Mobile phone networks	Kosovo
44	Mobile phone networks	Kosovo
45	Mobile phone networks	Kosovo
46	Mobile phone networks	Kosovo
47	Mobile phone networks	Kosovo
48	Mobile phone networks	Kosovo
49	Mobile phone networks	Kosovo

== See also ==
- Information and communications technology in Kosovo
