= Kaçanik Gorge =

Coordinates: 42.188°N 21.268°E

Kaçanik Gorge / Gryka e Kaçanikut
- Interactive map of Kaçanik Gorge / Gryka e Kaçanikut

Kaçanik Gorge (Albanian: Gryka e Kaçanikut; Serbian: Качаничка клисура, Kačanička klisura) is a gorge located in southern Kosovo, stretching between the town of Kaçanik and the Macedonian border, with the Lepenac river running through it. The Gorge speparates the Šar Mountain range (Sharr) from the Skopska Crna Gora Mountain range (Karadak).

== History ==
During Ottoman rule, the gorge was the site of battles. In April 1910, Idriz Seferi and about 5,000 fighters resisted Ottoman forces in the gorge of Kaçanik.

== Ravine ==
The ravine of Kaçanik, known as the "Drill" (Albanian: shpuem) refers to a perforated stone which sits at the entrance of the gorge. It was historically called "Marko's Stone", named after the Serbian prince Marko, who tradition holds as having fought Musa Kesedžija at this place.
