= Districts of Kosovo =

Administrative units within the Republic of Kosovo

- Category: District
- Location: Kosovo
- Created by: Constitution of Kosovo
- Number: 7
- Populations: 146,301 (Peja) – 477,312 (Pristina)
- Areas: 1,000 km^{2} (400 sq mi) (Ferizaj) – 2,500 km^{2} (950 sq mi) (Pristina)
- Subdivisions: Municipalities of Kosovo

Districts of Kosovo, also known as administrative regions of Kosovo (Albanian: rajonet administrative të Kosovës; Serbian: административни региони Косова / administrativni regioni Kosova) are regional administrative units within the administrative division of Kosovo. They were initially created as regional administrative structures of the UN-administered Kosovo (1999-2008), and were later reorganized, thus continuing to exist in the Republic of Kosovo (since 2008).

== UNMIK regions ==
In 1999, the United Nations Interim Administration Mission in Kosovo (UNMIK) undertook several administrative reforms, and divided the UN-administered Kosovo into five UNMIK regions, centered in: Gjilan, Mitrovica, Peja, Pristina, and Prizren. Initially, those UNMIK regions were headed by regional administrators, while on the municipal level of administrative division, municipal administrators were appointed.

Thus by the end of 1999, initial 29 municipalities were grouped into five UNMIK regions, and by the spring of 2000, the 30th municipality was formed (Malisheva) and attached to the UNMIK region of Prizren.

In July 2000, territorial scopes of all municipalities in the UN-administered Kosovo were officially regulated by UNMIK, thus resolving several remaining administrative issues.

Those UNMIK administrative reforms, that were introduced in 1999-2000, were not always identical with previous administrative divisions, that existed in the Autonomous Province of Kosovo and Metohija (APKM). The existing number of districts (five) was initially kept, but their territories were redefined to correspond more closely to five KFOR sectors:

- Kosovska Mitrovica District (APKM) was thus paralleled by the UNMIK region of Mitrovica
- Peć District (APKM) by the UNMIK region of Peja
- Kosovo District (APKM) by the UNMIK region of Pristina
- Kosovo-Pomoravlje District (APKM) by the UNMIK region of Gjilan
- Prizren District (Serbia) (APKM) by the UNMIK region of Prizren

Serbia protested the new administrative changes, not seeing it as legitimate, but the UNMIK implemented it regardless of Serbia's protests, because it had such authority, established by virtue of Resolution 1244 of the United Nations Security Council.

Since 2003, instead of initial regional administrators, UNMIK regions were headed by regional representatives.

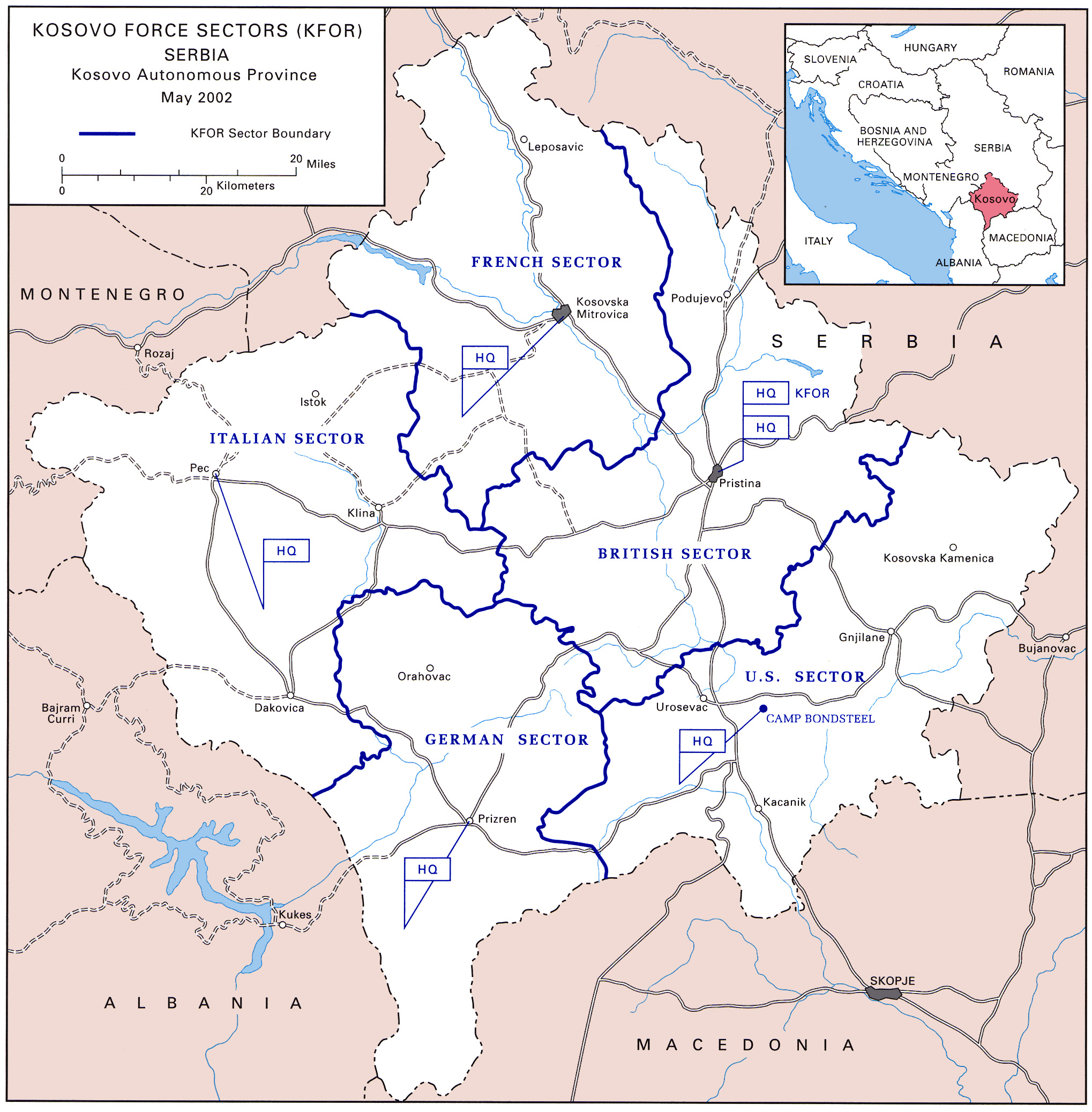
Five KFOR sectors (since 1999)

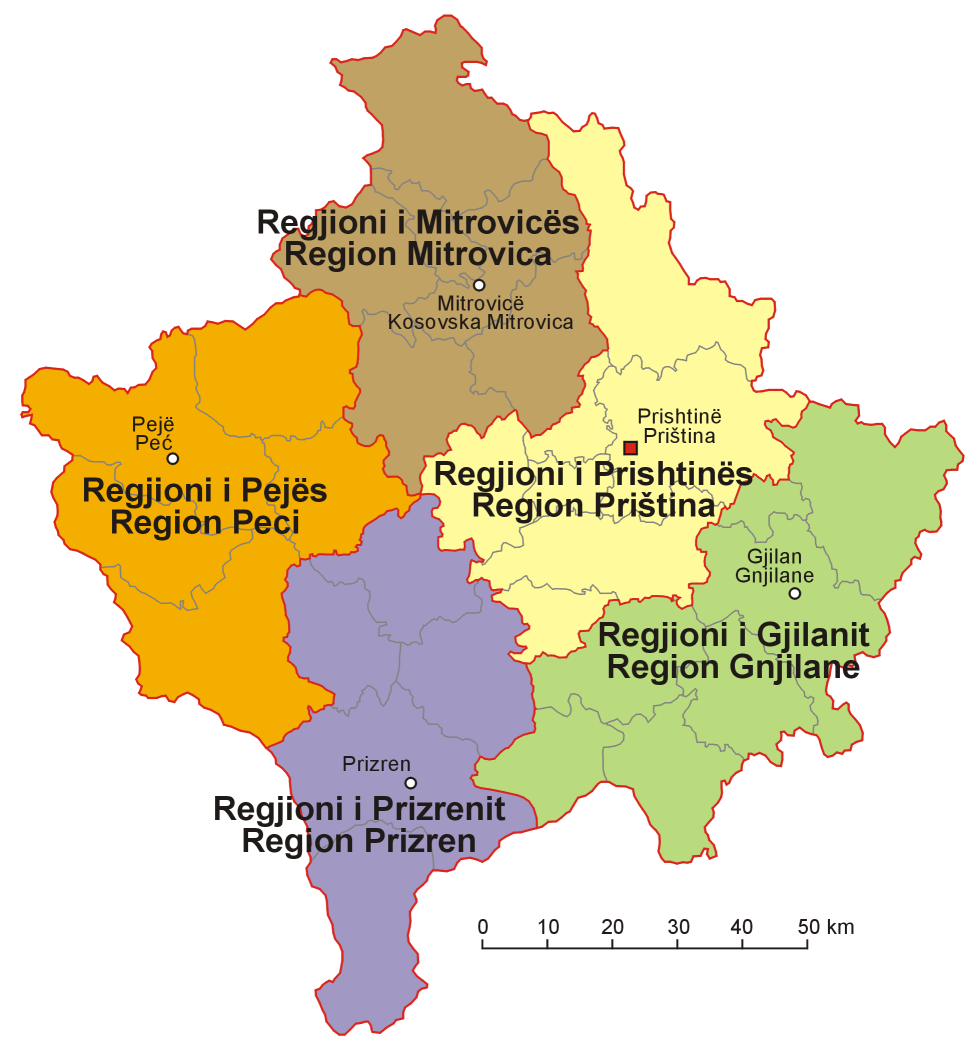
Five original UNMIK regions (1999-2008)

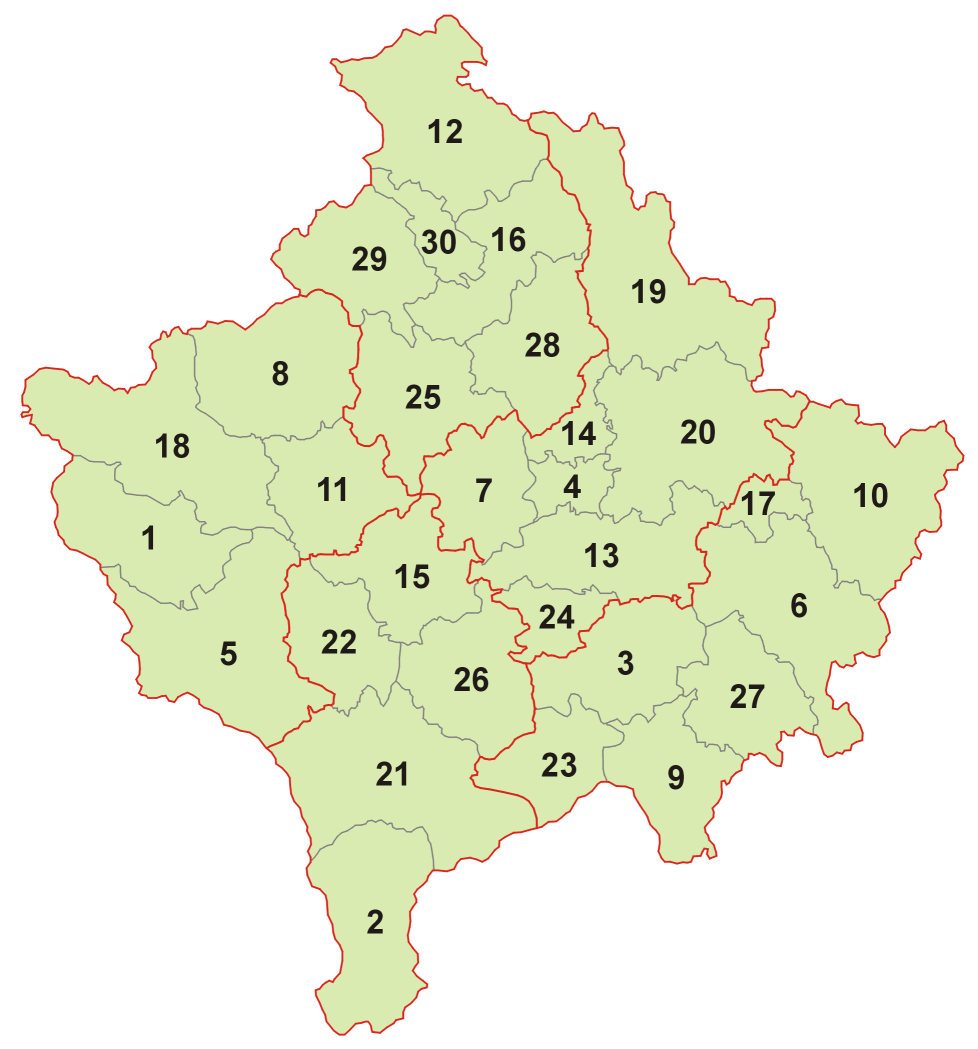
Municipalities within five original UNMIK regions (1999-2008)

== Administrative regions of Kosovo ==
In 2001, UNMIK created the Provisional Institutions of Self-Government in the UN-administered Kosovo, that also included the Transitional Government of Kosovo, with several ministries. Within some of those ministries, regional administrative branches were formed. Their number and territorial scopes varied. Thus in 2005, the Ministry of Health had six regions, centered in Gjakova, Gjilan, Mitrovica, Peja, Pristina, and Prizren, while some other ministries and government agencies also had their own distinctive regional branches.

Since 2008, within the administrative division of the Republic of Kosovo, at first six, and later seven administrative regions (districts) were established, as regional (deconcentrated) branches of various administrative departments:

- District of Ferizaj, newly created
- District of Gjakova, newly created
- District of Gjilan, smaller in scope than the initial UNMIK region of Gjilan
- District of Mitrovica, same in scope as UNMIK region of Mitrovica
- District of Peja, smaller in scope than the initial UNMIK region of Peja
- District of Pristina, similar in scope than the initial UNMIK region of Pristina
- District of Prizren, smaller in scope than the initial UNMIK region of Prizren

In 2014, seven consular districts were defined in the Republic of Kosovo. In 2020, the Ministry of Regional Development defined five development regions (Central, Eastern, Western, Southern, and Northern) in the Republic of Kosovo, and in 2022, the Kosovo Agency of Statistics redefined seven statistical regions, with same centers as seven administrative regions, but some of them not entirely identical in territorial scopes.

=== Seven administrative regions in Kosovo ===
Administrative districts (regions)	Map	Area in km^{2}	Population in 2024 (rank)	Density per km^{2}	Municipalities	District number	Settlements
District of Ferizaj (Rajoni i Ferizajit/Uroševački okrug)		1,030	180,897	175.6	Ferizaj; Hani i Elezit; Kaçanik; Shtime; Štrpce	05	126
District of Gjakova (Rajoni i Gjakovës/Đakovički okrug)		949	124,441	131.2	Gjakova; Junik; Rahovec	07	127
District of Gjilan (Rajoni i Gjilanit/Gnjilanski okrug)		1,206	150,126	124.5	Gjilan; Kamenica; Klokot; Parteš; Ranilug; Viti	06	287
District of Mitrovica (Rajoni i Mitrovicës/Kosovskomitrovački okrug)		2,077	166,805 (without North Kosovo)	155.9	Leposavić; Mitrovica; North Mitrovica; Skenderaj; Vushtrri; Zubin Potok; Zvečan	02	267
District of Peja (Rajoni i Pejës/Pećki okrug)		1,545	174,171	112.7	Peja; Istog; Klina; Deçan	03	155
District of Pristina (Rajoni i Prishtinës/Prištinski okrug)		2,470	511,938	207.3	Drenas; Gračanica; Kosovo Polje; Lipjan; Novo Brdo; Obiliq; Podujevë; Pristina	01	298
District of Prizren (Rajoni i Prizrenit/Prizrenski okrug)		1,397	271,535	194.4	Dragash; Malisheva; Mamusha; Prizren; Suva Reka	04	195

== See also ==
- Districts of Kosovo and Metohija
- List of districts of Kosovo by Human Development Index
- Administrative divisions of Kosovo
- Municipalities of Kosovo
- Cities and towns in Kosovo
- Populated places in Kosovo
