= Postal codes in Kosovo =

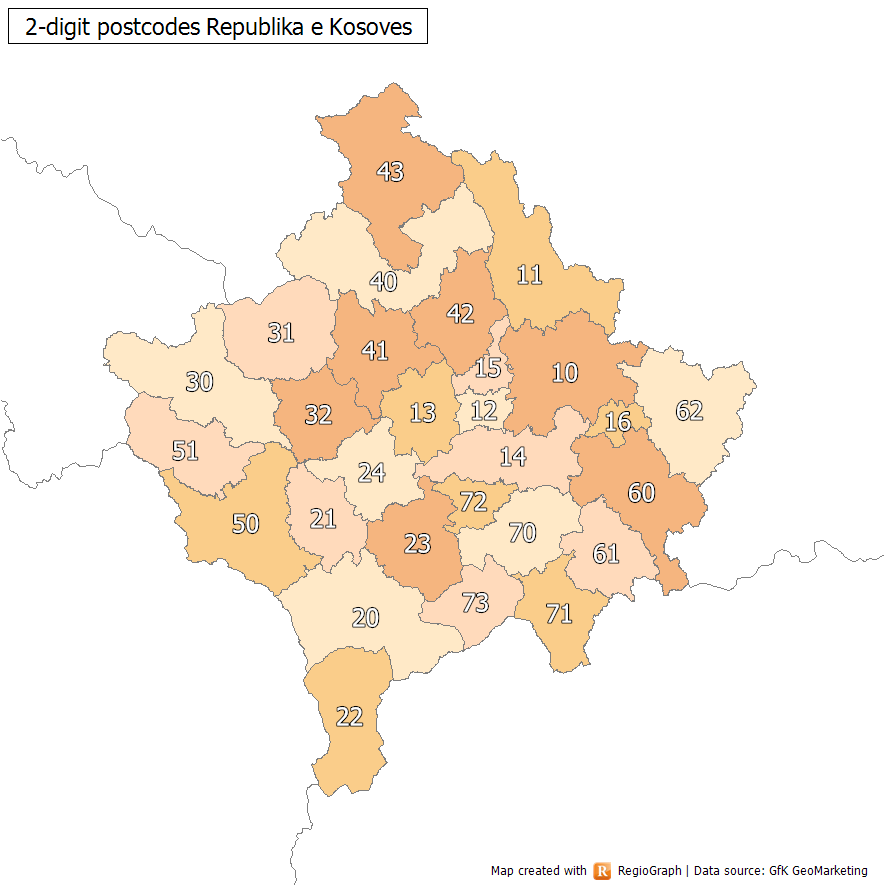
Post code areas.

A Kosovan postal code is a 5 digit string that is used for general locations in Kosovo, often written with a space between the second and third digits.

== Country code ==
The International Organization for Standardization - ISO, has yet to assign a code to the country. The ISO country code standard 3166 has a couple of unused codes that can be used for user specific elements: “If users need code elements to represent country names not included in this part of ISO 3166, the series of letters AA, QM to QZ, XA to XZ, and ZZ, and the series AAA to AAZ, QMA to QZZ, XAA to XZZ, and ZZA to ZZZ respectively and the series of numbers 900 to 999 are available.”

The European Commission and many other organisations are using ‘XK‘ as a temporary country code for Kosovo till ISO officially assigns a code. GeoNames will switch to the official ISO code as soon as it has been decided, but it is using ‘XK‘ until then.

The US standards body FIPS has assigned the country code ‘KV‘ to Kosovo.

== Dialing code ==
The dialing code for Kosovo is +383, and the temporary country code XK is 5 digit numeric.

== Regional postal codes ==
Pristina	Prizren	Peja	Mitrovica	Gjakova	Gjilan	Ferizaj
100xx^{[usurped]}	200xx^{[usurped]}	300xx^{[usurped]}	400xx^{[usurped]}	500xx^{[usurped]}	600xx^{[usurped]}	700xx^{[usurped]}
