= District of Ferizaj =

District in Kosovo

District of Ferizaj: Rajoni i Ferizajit (Albanian) Uroševački okrug/ Урошевачки округ (Serbian)
- District of Kosovo
- Location in Kosovo
- Interactive map of District of Ferizaj
- Country: Kosovo
- Capital: Ferizaj

Area
  - Total: 1,030 km^{2} (400 sq mi)

Population (2024)
  - Total: 180,897
  - Rank: 5th
  - Density: 176/km^{2} (455/sq mi)
- Postal code: 70000
- Vehicle registration: 05
- Municipalities: 5
- Settlements: 126
- HDI (2017): 0.754 (3rd in Kosovo)

The District of Ferizaj (Albanian: Rajoni i Ferizajit; Serbian: Урошевачки округ, Uroševački okrug) is one of the seven districts of Kosovo. Ferizaj is the seat of the district. According to the 2024 census, the total population of the district is 180,897.

== Municipalities ==
The district of Ferizaj consists of five municipalities and 126 settlements.

Municipality	Population (2024)	Area (km2)	Density (km2)	Settlements
Ferizaj	109,345	345	315	45
Kaçanik	27,742	221	151.4	31
Shtime	24,320	134	203.9	23
Hani i Elezit	8,600	83	113.1	11
Štrpce	10,890	247	28.1	16
District of Ferizaj	180,897	1,030	175.6	126

The city of Ferizaj was inhabited during the prehistoric era by the Starčevo culture, Vinča culture and Baden cultures. During the Ottoman period, Ferizaj was a trading center on the route between Belgrade and Thessaloniki. Camp Bondsteel, a United States Army base and the largest, most expensive American foreign military base in Southeast Europe since the Vietnam War, was built there in 1999.

Ferizaj is in south-eastern Kosovo, about halfway between Pristina and Skopje, North Macedonia. It is about 230 kilometres (140 mi) north-east of Tirana, 55 kilometres (34 mi) north of Skopje, 300 kilometres (190 mi) west of Sofia, 35 kilometres (22 mi) south of Pristina and 300 km east of Podgorica. Ferizaj is a location of a river bifurcation; the Nerodime river divides into two branches, which flow to two different seas.

== Ethnic groups ==
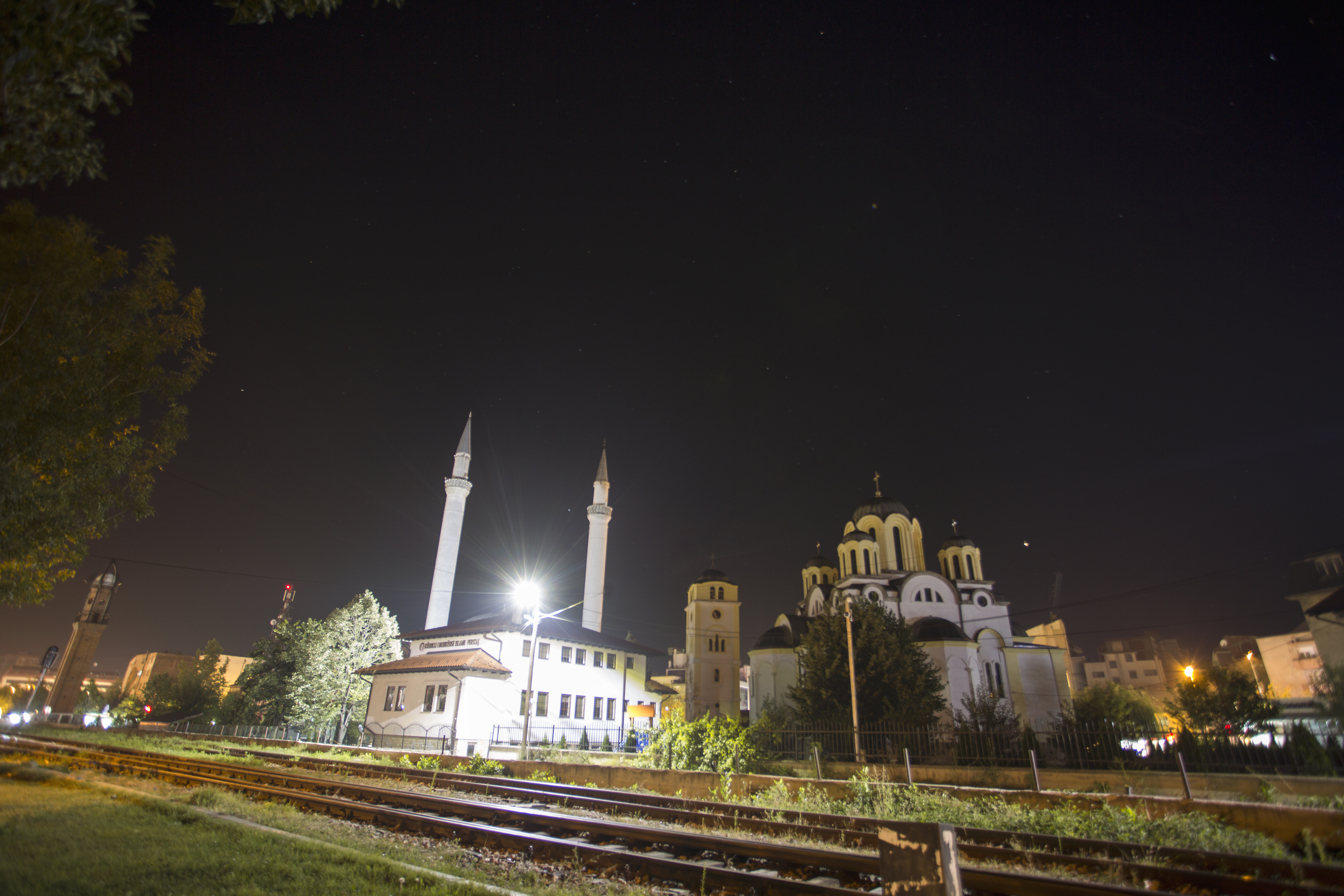
District of Ferizaj

All the municipalities have an Albanian majority: Ferizaj (95.9 percent), Shtime (96.8 percent), Kaçanik (99.9 percent) and Hani i Elezit (99.5 percent). Štrpce has a mixed population of Albanians (54.1 percent) and Serbs.

Ethnic groups
Group	Number	%
Albanians	177,075	95.4
Serbs	3,230	1.7
Roma (Ashkali)	4,661	2.5
Other or no response	677	0.4

== History ==
The town (known as Ferızovık when it was part of the Ottoman Empire) was little more than a village until 1873, when it became part of the Belgrade-Thessaloniki railway. Its name derives from a hotel owned before 1873 by Feriz Shasivari.

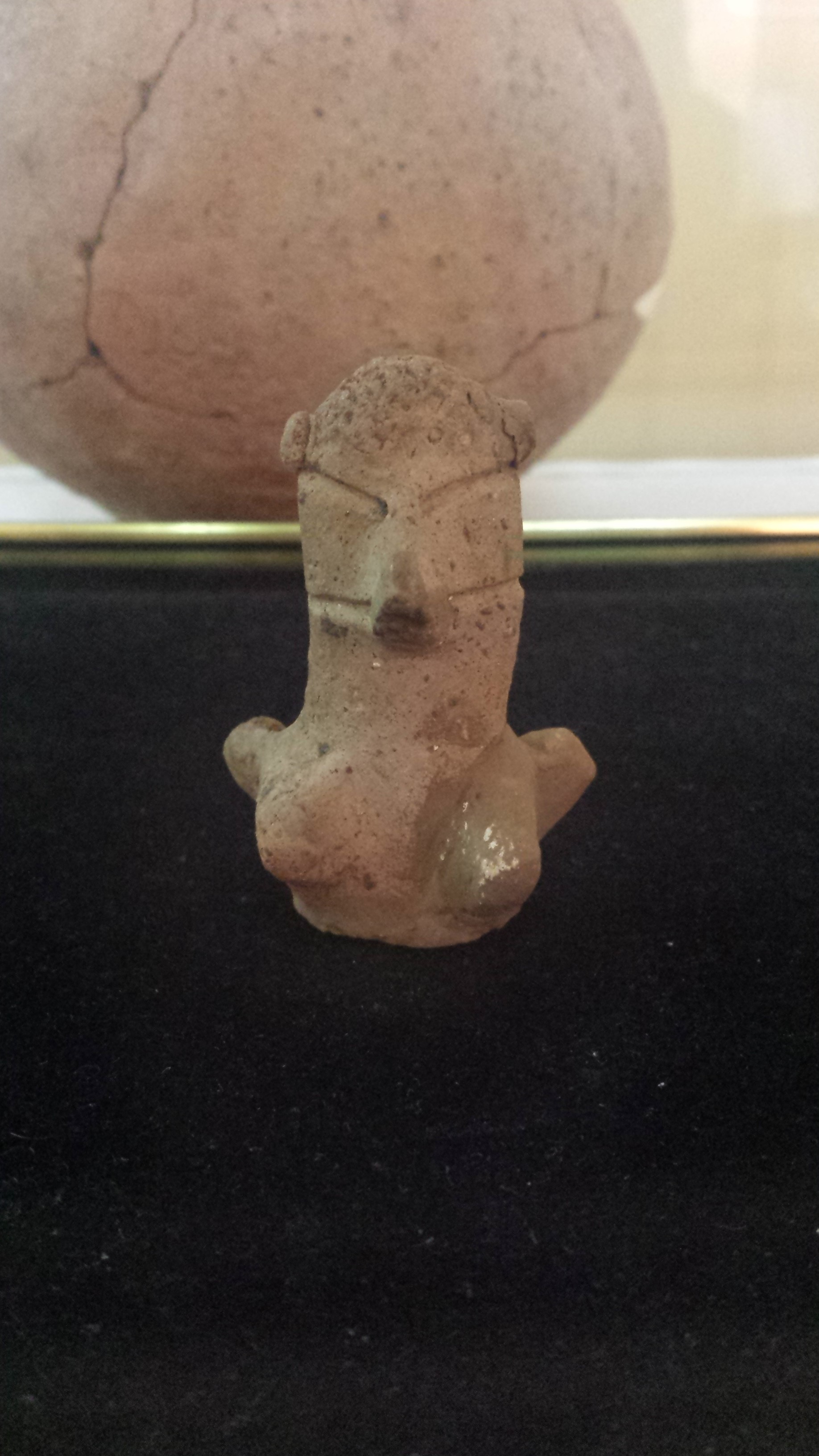
The Goddess of Varos, dating to the sixth millennium BC

The oldest known cultural group, in the 6th and 5th millennia BC in Kosovo, was the Starčevo culture. They lived near rivers and river terraces. Their houses were built of willows and mud, and their main occupation was agriculture.

The Vinča culture, who replaced the Starčevo culture around 4300 BC, also lived near rivers. The settlements were unfortified, with dense rows of willow-and-mud houses. Remnants of their culture include ceramic vessels and large numbers of baked-clay figures. The Bubanj-Hum culture, which replaced the Vinča culture from present-day Bulgaria, left few artifacts. The Baden culture arrived from the Danube in its southernmost expansion, ending before the end of the 3rd millennium BC.

=== Antiquity ===
From the 8th century BC to the Roman conquest, the Dardani inhabited the region. They cremated their dead and buried their remains in tumuli. Two necropolises have been found; one in the Kuline area near the railway station in Gërlicë, and the other in the Mollopolc region along the Ferizaj-Štimlje road.

Around 280 BC, the Dardani were reportedly ruled by a king. Most surviving information on the Dardani concerns their wars against the Macedons. The first contact between the Dardani and the Romans was in 200 BC, when they offered military assistance against Macedonia. In 96 BC, the Roman emperor Sulla subdued the Dardani. A number of Roman settlements were founded across the valley, on the old lake terraces. These settlements had a road network connecting cities such as Ulpiana and Skopje, part of the road connecting Macedonia to Dalmatia via Ferizaj and the gorge of Kaçanik. Parts of the road were discovered on the riverbed of the Lepenac and near the villages of Doganaj and Reka.

=== Middle ages ===
The region was on a road which ran south from Slovenia and Croatia through Sarajevo, Vushtrri, Pristina and Lipjan to Skopje and crossed the Shkodër–Prizren road. According to an anonymous 1559–1560 manuscript in the library of St Mark's Basilica in Venice by a traveler from Venice to Istanbul, "On July 3 set off and came to a place named Villa Negra Carraleva) ... The valley is surrounded on all sides by hills." The writer then passed Sopotnice, a village near Kaçanik, and reached Skopje on July 5. Many artifacts have been found at Nerodimë e Poshtme and Shtime.

According to a 1455 Turkish census of the former Branković dynasty, the Ferizaj region had 646 villages. Agriculture was the basic source of income, and other occupations included blacksmiths, potters, furriers, ranchers, and priests and monks.

After the Austrian-Turkish wars of the late 17th century and the first half of the 18th century, rapid Islamization began under the Ottoman Empire. According to Turkish sources, "Feriz-Bey" was founded with the railway from Skopje to Mitrovica. Although it was first known as "Tasjon" by the surrounding villagers (the Turkish pronunciation of the French station), the name Ferizaj derived from Feriz Shasivari.

Inns, warehouses and a market followed the railway station. Traders passed through Kosovo from Prizren to Shkodër by caravan en route to Thessaloniki. Cereals were exported through Ferizaj in exchange for goods from Thessaloniki and Skopje. For about 30 years, Ferizaj had about 400 houses and 200 shops, and most of its population were traders or craftsmen. Some 20th-century visitors described the city as having more stores than houses.

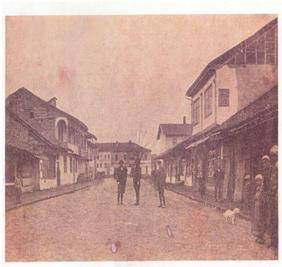
Undated photo of Ferizaj

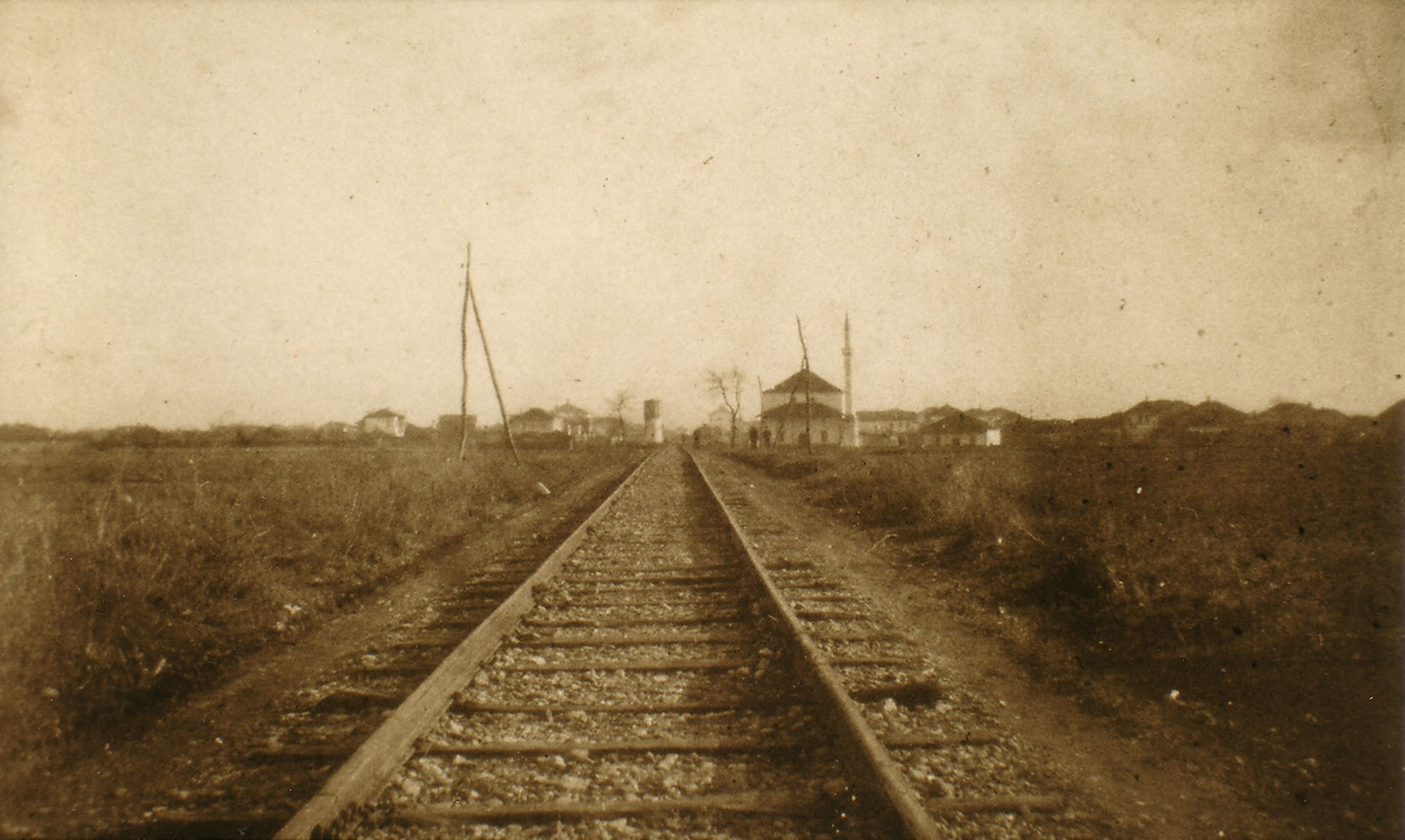
The railway in 1903

When Ferizaj fell to Serbia during the First Balkan War, the local Albanian population offered a determined resistance and fighting reportedly lasted for three days. The Serbian commander ordered the population to surrender. Three to four hundred men were executed and, according to the Archbishop of Skopje Lazër Mjeda, only three Muslim Albanians over age fifteen were left alive. The destruction of Albanian-occupied villages around Ferizaj followed. Before the 1913 Treaty of London in 1913 made Ferizaj part of the Kingdom of Serbia, its name was changed to Uroševac after Stefan Uroš V of Serbia.

The beginning of the First World War separated Serbia and Montenegro. In October 1915, Bulgaria entered the war and Ferizaj was part of the main artery connecting Kumanovo and Skopje with Kosovo. The city was a stopping point for the Bulgarian attack from the Kaçanik Gorge. Serb resistance ended on 25 November 1915, when it was conquered by the Bulgarian Army with aid from the Albanians. The army withdrew on 1 April 1916, leaving the Prizren-Albania railway under Austro-Hungarian command.

=== Modern period ===
The early Second World War negated a 1938 agreement between Yugoslavia and Turkey which would have resettled large numbers of Albanians in Turkey from 1939 to 1944. After the Axis invasion, Italian troops were deployed in Ferizaj and its auxiliary army airport.

In 1941, the district Communist party encouraged enlistment in Albania's National Liberation Movement. After the Italian surrender the district was occupied by Germany, which treated the Albanian population somewhat better. In 1943, the arrest and deportation of all National Liberation Movement participants began. The city was liberated on 2 December 1944, and the district's economy needed to be rebuilt.

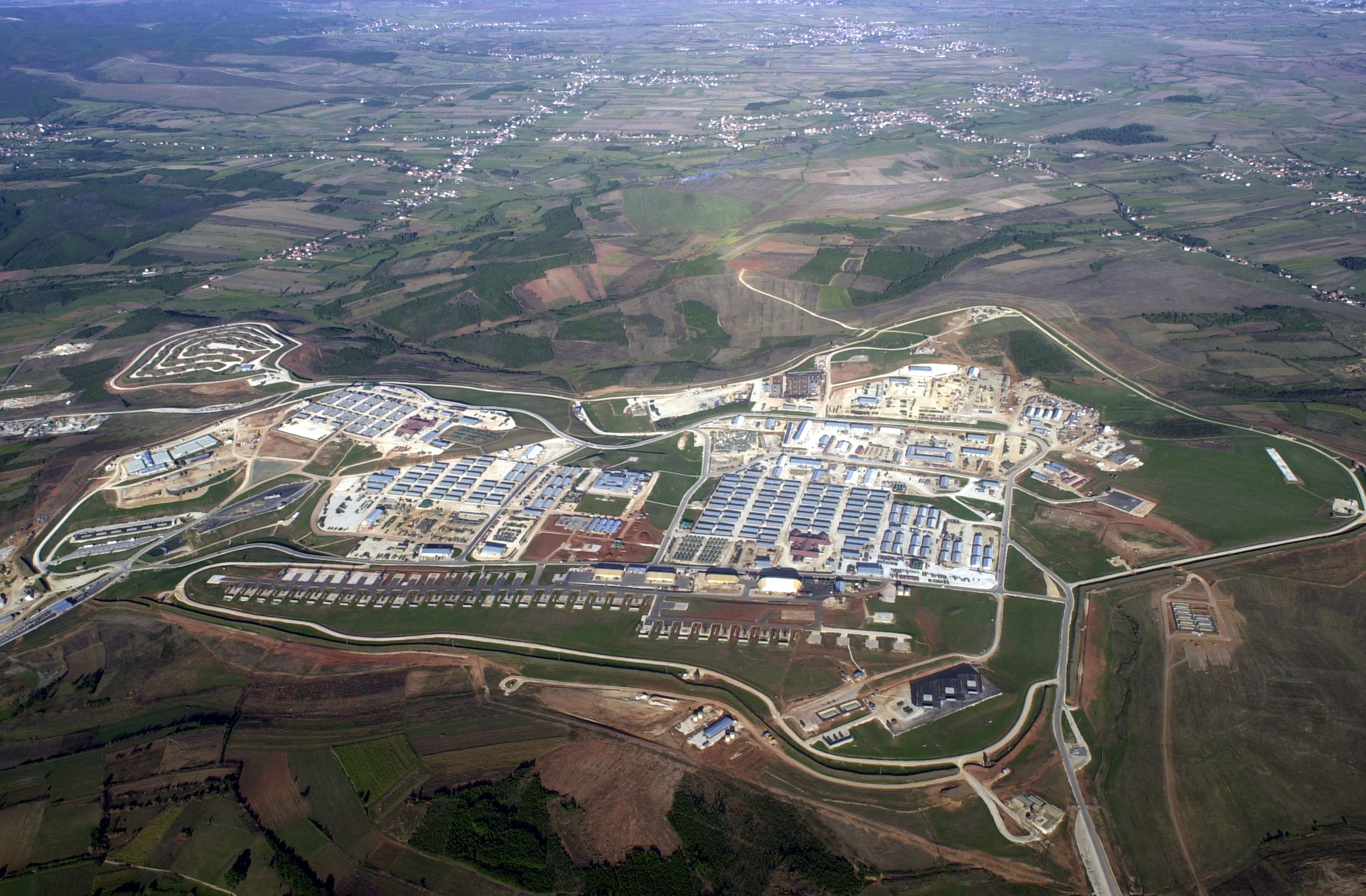
Aerial view of Camp Bondsteel

==== Kosovo War ====
The city of Ferizaj experienced some damage during the 1999 Kosovo War, with some of its Albanian neighborhoods shelled and burned by the Yugoslav People's Army.

Camp Bondsteel, the main base of the United States Army detachment of the KFOR peacekeeping force in Kosovo, is on rolling hills and farmland near the city. The camp, established immediately after the war, covers 955 acres (360,000 square meters).

== See also ==
- Administrative divisions of Kosovo
