= Roads in Kosovo =

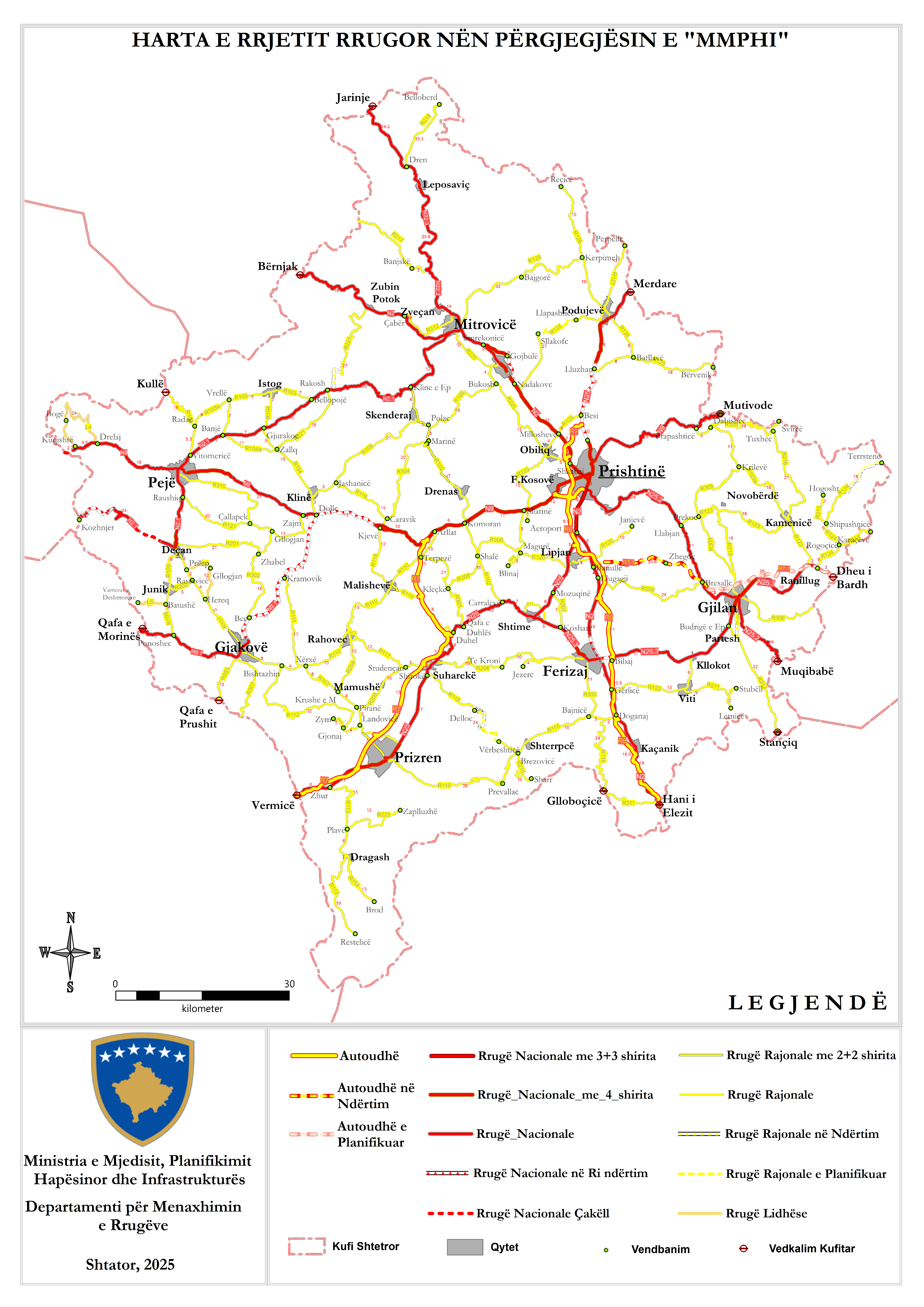
Road map of Kosovo

Roads in Kosovo form the backbone of the country's transport network and is the primary way of passenger and freight transportation. The country has a road network of approximately 2484.85 km, consisting of motorways (Albanian: autostradë, Serbian: autoput) around 159.41 km, national roads (Albanian: rrugë nacionale, Serbian: magistralni put) around 752.69 km, regional roads (Albanian: rrugë rajonale, Serbian: regionalni putevi) around 1524.01 km, and connecting roads (Albanian: rrugë lidhëse, Serbian: povezni putevi) around 48.74 km.

== Network statistics ==
During 2025, the total length of roads in Kosovo increased, reaching 2,463 kilometres, compared to 2,434 kilometres in 2024. This represents an expansion of 29 kilometres, corresponding to a 1.19% increase in the country's road infrastructure.

Road length in Kosovo by category (km), 2015–2025
Years	2015	2016	2017	2018	2019	2020	2021	2022	2023	2024	2025
Motorways	78	98	108	119.1	137.1	137.1	137.1	137.1	137.2	137.2	137.2
National Roads	630.4	630.4	630.4	641.7	665.17	753.44	753.44	753	753	753	753
Regional Roads	1305.0	1305.0	1305	1313.9	1471.2	1494.9	1494.9	1495	1495	1495	1524
Connecting Road	0	0	0	0	38.11	46.88	46.88	48.8	48.8	48.8	48.8
Total	2013	2033	2043	2074	2311	2432	2432	2434	2434	2434	2463

During 2025, out of a total of 2,434 km of roads, 2,484 km or 98% were paved roads, while 49.74 km or 2% of the road network, were unpaved.

Paved and unpaved roads in Kosovo by length (km), 2015–2025
Years	2015	2016	2017	2018	2019	2020	2021	2022	2023	2024	2025
Paved roads	1923.4	1943.4	1953.4	1979.3	2210.67	2346.86	2345.86	2384.26	2384.26	2384.26	2413.30
Unpaved roads	90.0	90.0	90.0	95.4	101	85.54	86.54	49.74	49.74	49.74	49.74
Total	2013.4	2033.4	2043.4	2074.7	2311.67	2432.40	2432.40	2434.00	2434.00	2434.00	2 463.04

== Motorways ==
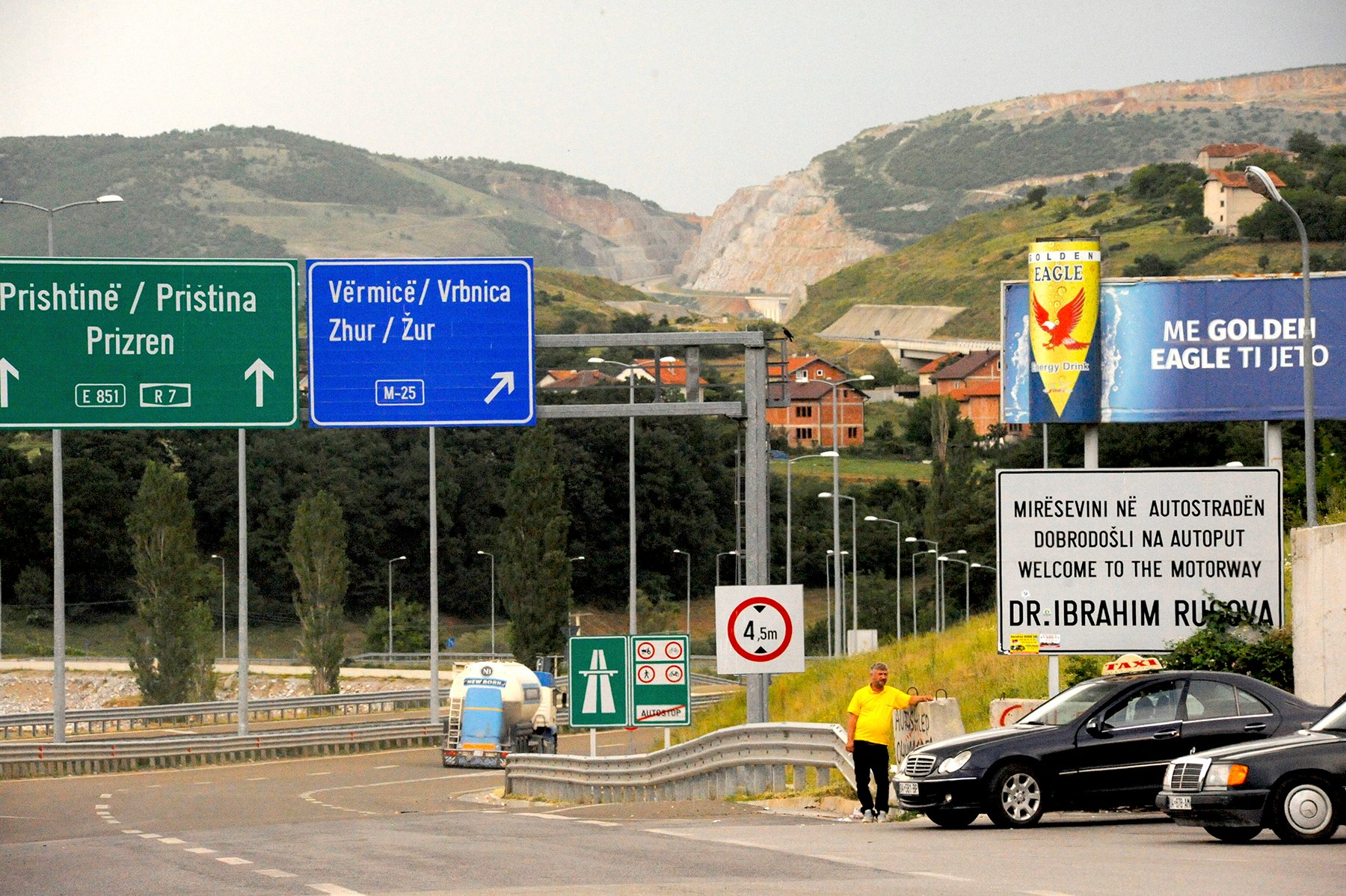
R7 motorway near the border with Albania.

According to the Law of Roads of the Republic of Kosovo, a motorway (Albanian: autostradë) (Serbian: autoput) also known as " Autorrugë" and "Autoudhë" in Albanian is described as "a public road built for motor vehicles, marked with special traffic signs with physically separated carriageways, lanes at least 3.5m wide and emergency stopping lanes where needed". They are usually identified by route numbers within the SEETO Core Regional Transport Network, such as Route 6 (R6) and Route 7 (R7).

Designation	Name	Route	In service	Planned
R7	Autostrada"Ibrahim Rugova"	Border with Albania (Vërmica Border Crossing) - Prizren - Suha Reka - Arllat; N9/R7 intersection in Fushë Kosova - R6/R7 intersection - Pristina - Trude	76.87 km	129.8 km
R6	Autostrada "Arben Xhaferi"	R6/R7 intersection - Lipjan - Babush i Muhaxhereve - Ferizaj - Kaqanik - Border with North Macedonia (Hani i Elezit)	60.28 km	60.28 km
R7.1	Autostrada "Agim Ramadani"	N2/R7.1 intersection in Banullë - R7.1/R6 intersection - Zhegoc - Gjilan - Border with Serbia (Dheu i Bardhë Border Crossing)	0 km	47.1 km

== National Roads ==
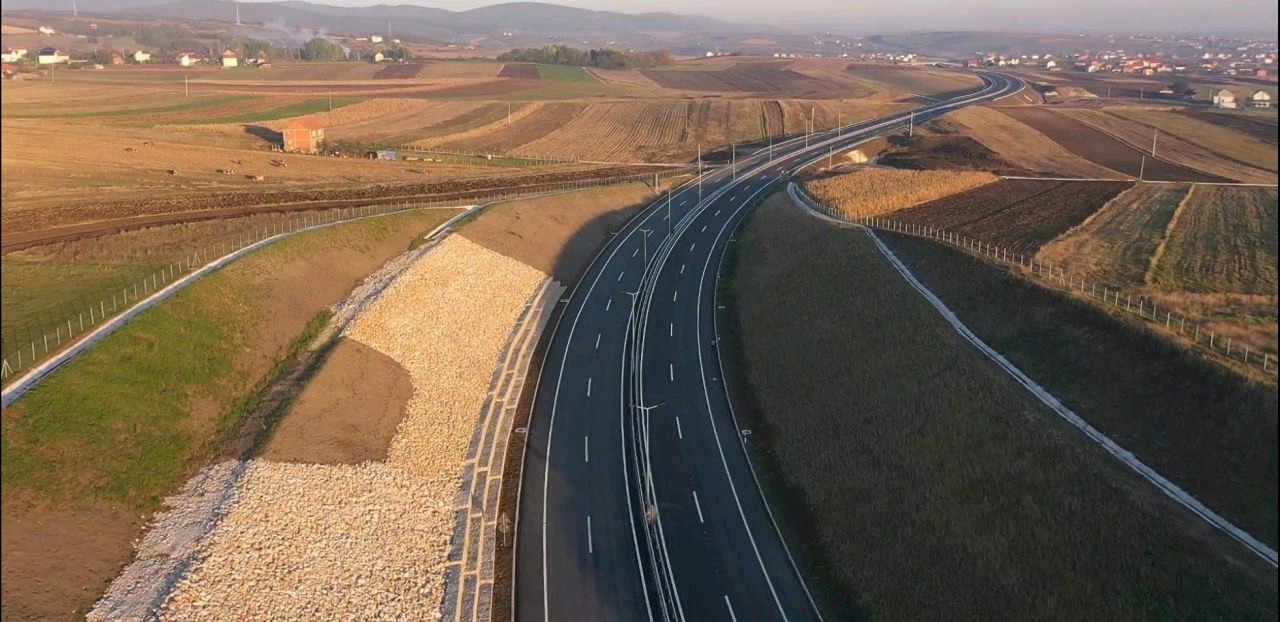
Segment of the N2 National Road

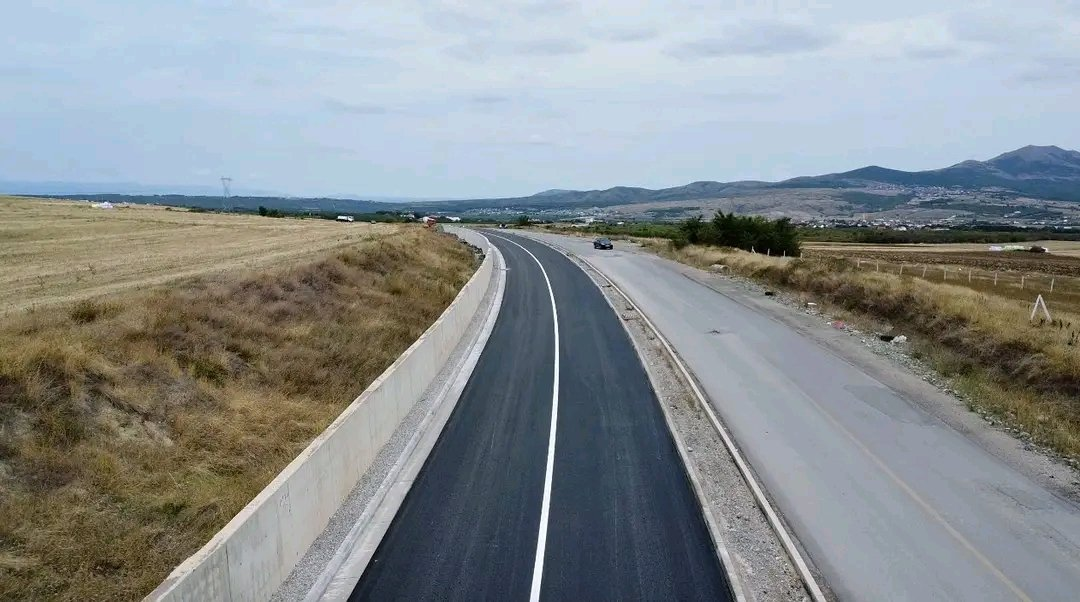
Newly constructed road on N9.1

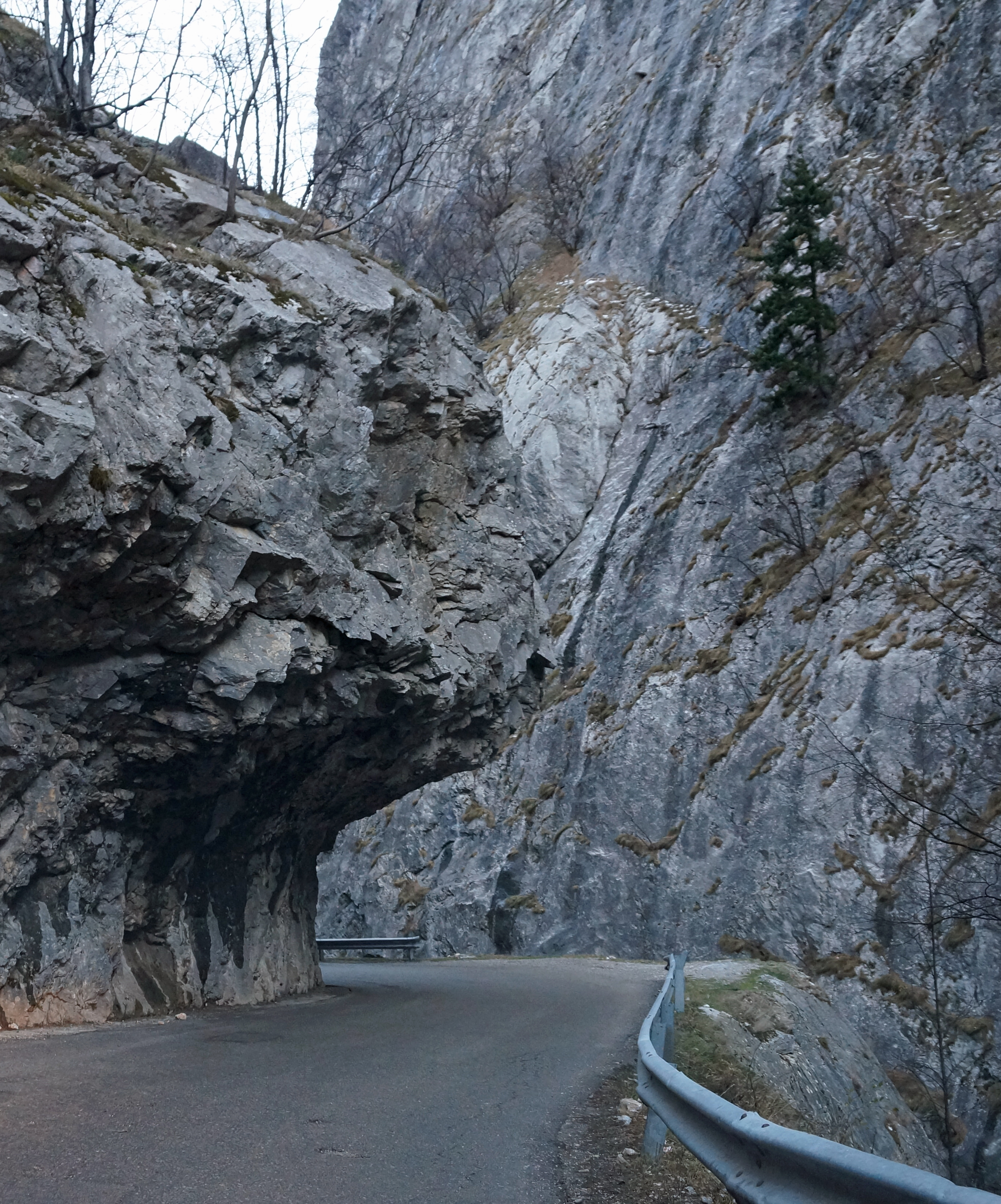
N9 road near the Rugova Canyon.

National Roads (Albanian: rrugë nacionale, Serbian: magistralni put) are defined as " a public road officially ranked as a national road linking two or more towns and which may serve as a link to regions outside Kosovo". The names of national roads usually come from the old Yugoslav naming system, but newer roads are based on other systems. Around 2015, the roads were renamed from magjistrale into nacionale.

Designation	Route	In service (km)	Planned (km)
N2	Border with North Macedonia (Hani i Elezit Border Crossing) - Kaçanik - Ferizaj - Lipjan - Pristina - Vushtrri - Mitrovica - Zubin Potok - Border with Serbia (Ujmani Border Crossing)	143.64	148.64
N2.1	M2/M2.1 intersection in Mitrovica - Upper Klina - Rakosh - Bellopojë - Gjurakoc - Banjë - Vitomirica - Peja - Deçan - Border with Montenegro (Kozhnjer Border Crossing)	107	9.23
N22.3	N2/N22.3 intersection in Mitrovica - Mitrovica - Leposavić - Border with Serbia (Jarinjë Border Crossing)	54.36	54.36
N25	Border with Albania (Vërmica Border Crossing) - Prizren - Suha Reka - Shtime - Lipjan - Pristina - Podujeva - Border with Serbia (Mërdara Border Crossing)	116.23	116.23
N25.2	M2/M25.2 intersection in Pristina - Gračanica - Gjilan - Border with Serbia (Muqibaba Border Crossing)	60.24	60.24
N25.3	M25/M25.3 intersection in Shtime - Ferizaj - Gjilan - Ranilug - Border with Serbia (Dheu i Bardhë Border Crossing)	69.35	69.35
N9	Border with Serbia (Mutivoda Border Crossing) - Pristina - Fushë Kosova - Pristina International Airport - Komoran - M9/R7 interchange - Kijevë - Klina - Peja - Kuçishtë - Border with Montenegro (Qarkor Border Crossing)	141.91	145.13
N9.1	M9/M9.1 interchange at Klina - Mirusha waterfalls - Gjakova - Border with Albania (Qafë Morinë Border Crossing)	52.98	52.98

== Regional Roads ==
Total of: 1524.01 km

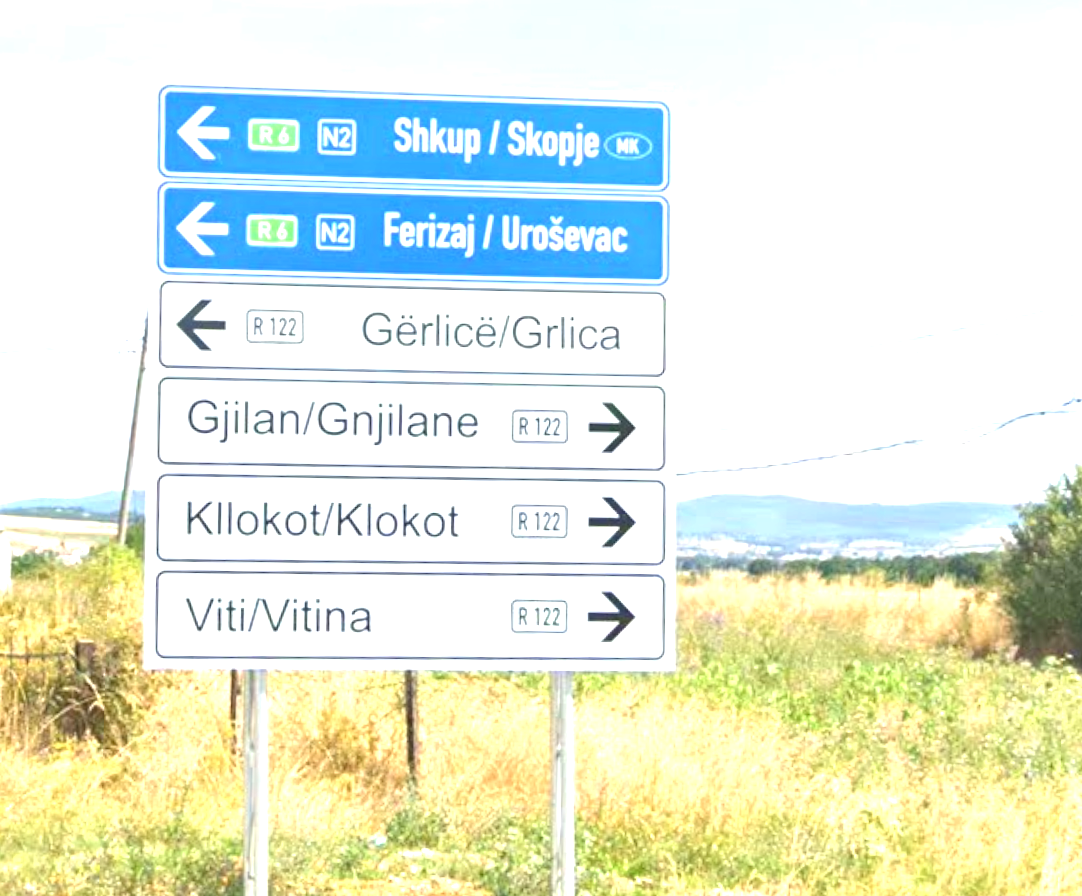
Road sign (north east) of Begracë, Kaçanik

Regional Roads (Albanian: rrugë rajonale, Serbian: regionalni putevi) are defined as "a public road officially classified as a regional road that connects centres of economic importance of two or more municipalities.".

Designation	Route	In Service (km)
	N25/R-102 intersection - Carralevë - Komoran - N2.1/R-102 intersection in Klina e Eperme	44.64
	N2.1/R-103 intersection in Banjë - Vrellë - Istog - N2.1/R101 intersection in Bellopojë	21.63
	R103/R103a intersection in Vrellë - R106/R103a intersection in Radac	8.20
	N9/R104 intersection in Dollc - Klinë - Gjurakoc - R103/R104 intersection in Istog	25.04
	R104/R104a intersection - Saradran - N2.1/R104a intersection in Banjë	11.03
	R104/R105 intersection in Klinë - Skenderaj - N2/R105 intersection in Vushtrri	45.82
	N2.1/R106 intersection in Vitomeric-Border with Montenegro (Kullë Border Crossing)	21.61
	N25/R107 intersection in Prizren - Gjakovë - N9/R017 intersection in Pejë	56.80
	N9.1/R109 intersection in Ponoshec - Junik - R107/R109 intersection in Deçan	17.70
	R107/R110 intersection in Xërxë-Rahovec-Malishevë- N9/R110 intersection in Arllat	37.80
	R107/R110 intersection in Xërxë- N9.1/R111 intersection in Kramovik	16.95
	R107/R112 intersection in Landovicë - R107/R112 intersection in Bishtazhin	35.66
	N25/R113 intersection in Zhur-Dragash-Restelicë	40.76
	R123/R114 intersection in Dragash-Brod	12.98
	N25/R115 intersection in Prizren-Prevalla-Shtërpcë- N2/R115 intersection in Doganaj	59.82
	R115/R116 intersection in Doganaj-Border Crossing with North Macedonia (Glloboçicë Border Crossing)	23.51
	N25/R117 intersection in Suharekë-Stundençan- R117/R204 intersection in Rahovec	17.35
	N25/R118 intersection in Suharekë-Mushtisht-R115/R118 intersection inBrezovicë	32.30
	N25/R119 intersection in Duhel-Malishevë-Kijvë- R105/R119 intersection in Jashanicë	43.11
	N25/R120 intersection in Besi-Obiliq-Lipjan-Janjevë	58.69
	R107/R121 intersection in Raushiq-Gllogjan- N9/R121 intersection in Zajm	30.05
	N2/R112 intersection in Gërlicë -Viti - N25.3/R112 in Kllokot	19.65
	N25.2/R113 intersection in Llabjan-Novobërdë- N25.3/R123 intersection inKamenicë	39.83
	R216/R123a intersection in Kamenicë-Strezoc- R216/R305 intersection Prapashticë	27.71
	N25.3/R124 intersection in Domoroc-Border with Serbia (Tërsten Border Crossing)	28.90
	N25/R125 intersection in Lluzhan- Batllave - Border with Serbia (Bërvenik Border Crossing)	25.38
	R125/R126 intersection in Batllavë-Podujevë-Pollatë-Reçicë	34.96
	N25/R127 intersection in Podujevë-Border with Serbia (Prepellc Border Crossing)	14.64
	N2/R128 intersection in Nadakovc-Samadrexhë - R127/R129 intersection inPodujevë	27.48
	N22.3/R128 intersection in Mitrovicë-Bajgorë- R129/R126 intersection in Kërpimeh	35.42
	R107/R201 intersection in Deçan-Maznik -Zhabel-Jabllanicë- R121/R201 intersection in Gllogjan	22.63
	R107/R202 intersection in Rastavic - R109/R202 intersection in Junik	5.43
	N9.1/R203 intersection in Gjakovë- Border with Albania (Border Crossing Qafë Prush)	9.96
	R107/R204 intersection in Krushë e Madhe - Rahovec	12.45
	R107/R205 intersection in Piran-Mamushë- R117/R205 intersection in Studenqan	12.91
	N25.3/R206 intersection in Ferizaj- Jezerc-Budakovë- N25/R206 intersection Suharekë	38.97
	N25/R207 intersection inHani i Ri- Koshare, Ferizaj- N25.3/R207 intersection in Muzeqinë	6.76
	R120/R208 intersection in Magure-Blinaje	3.26
	N2/R209 intersection in Llugaxhi-Gadime e Ulët- N25.5/R207 intersection in Bresalc	24.04
	R115/R210 intersection Brezovicë-Brezovica Ski Resort	9.51
	R112/R211 intersection in Viti - Letnicë	12.12
	N25.3/R213 intersection in Livoq-Zhegër- Border with North Macedonia (Stanqiq Border Crossing)	21.88
	R212/R212a intersection inBudrigë-Gjilan	6.02
	N25.3/R213 intersection in Gjilan-Makresh-Bostan	18.36
	R124/R214 intersection in Rogoçicë-Karaqevë	7.07
	R124/R125 intersection in Shipashticë-Hogoshte	6.08
	R123/R216 intersection in Kamenicë-Tuxhec- Border with Serbia (Svircë Border Crossing)	24.08
	N22.3/R217 intersection in Banjskë-Border with Serbia (Izvor Border Crossing)	19.12
	N22.3/R218 intersection in Dren-Belloberd	15.56
	R112/R219 intersection in Gjonaj-Zym	4.34
	N2/R220 intersection in Shkabaj - Obiliq - Bukosh- N2/R220 intersection inMitrovicë	35.85
	R104/R221 intersection in Zallq - Rakosh - N2/R221 intersection in Zubin Potok	43.02
	R113/R222 intersection in Plavë-Zaplluzhë	12.67
	N25/R301 intersection in Qafa e Duhles-Kleçkë - R110/R301 intersection in Terpezë	21.18
	N9.1/R302 intersection in Bec-Kodrali-Gërgoc- R201/R302 intersection inZhabel	15.56
	R115/R303 intersection in Bajnicë-Gremë-Ferizaj - N25.3/R303 intersection	11.10
	R102/R304 intersection in Marinë-Rezallë- R119/R304 intersection in Carravik	19.66
	N9/R305 intersection in Prapashticë-Hajkobillë- R216/R305 intersection in Tuxhec	22.86
	N25.3/R306 intersection inGjilan-Malishevë-Uglar- Border with Serbia (Pogragjë Border Crossing)	18.49
	R203/R307 intersection in Gjakovë-Kusar - Border with Albania (Goden Border Crossing)	15.24
	R120/R308 intersection in Magure-Shalë- R301/R308 intersection Kleqkë	18.39
	R213/R309 intersection in Strazhë-Prekovc-Izvor- R123a/R309 intersection in Krilevë	29.60
	R107/R310 intersection in Pejë-Rosulë- R121/R310 intersection in Çallapek	21.22
	N2/R311 intersection in Han i Elezit-Gorancë - Glloboqicë	12.91
	N2/R312 intersection in Çabër-Vinarc- N22.3/R311 intersection in Mitrovicë	12.70

== Regional Transit Roads ==
Designation	Route	Length (km)
	N25/RT1 intersection in Shtime - N25.3/RT1 intersection in Shtime	6.84
	R117/RT2 intersection in Rahovec - R110/RT2 intersection in Rahovec	3.43
	N25/RT3 intersection in Lubizhde - R7/RT3 intersection - R107/RT3 intersection in Prizren	7.32

== Connecting Roads ==
Designation	Route	Length (km)
	R211/L1 intersection in Letnice - Stubëll	2.38
	R102/L2 intersection in Batushe - Kompleksi Memoriali i Dëshmorëve	0.27
	R107/L3 intersection - Hereq - Gllogjan - Prilep - R107/L3 intersection	11.86
	N9/L4 intersection in Drelaj - Koshutan - Shkrel - Boget - N9/L4 intersection Kuqishtë	23.63
	R109/L5 intersection in Batushë - Koshare - Varrezat e Dëshmorëve	8.71
	N9/L6 intersection - Pristina International Airport	1.89

== See also ==
- International E-road network
- European route E65
- European route E851
- European route E80
