= Dobrushta =

Dobrushta: Dobrushtë (Albanian); Дoбруште/Dobrušte (Serbian)
- Village
- Location in Kosovo
- Coordinates: 42°11′N 20°35′E
- Location: Kosovo
- District: Prizren
- Municipality: Prizren

Population (2024)
  - Total: 319
- Time zone: UTC+1 (CET)
  - Summer (DST): UTC+2 (CEST)

Dobrushta (or Dobrushtë, serbian: Дoбруште/Dobrušte) is a village in Prizren Municipality in southwest Kosovo.

== History ==
After the Kingdom of Serbia acquired Kosovo following the first Balkan War (1912), Serbia arranged a Military Administration named Vrbnica. Dobrušte was part of it. The municipality was part of the Srez (serb. Šar) of the Okrug Prizren. This administrative subdivision lastet till January 6, 1929, after the area was made part of the Vardar Banovina in the Kingdom Yugoslavia.

== Geography ==
Dobrushta is located in southwestern Kosovo, four kilometer east of Morina in Albania and nine Kilometers west of Prizren. Neighbouring villages are Vërmica, Zhur und Shkoza. The mountain landscape of the Koritnik starts south of the village.

The M-25 goes directly through the village and the R7 passes north of the village.

=== Climate ===
Climate data for Dobrushta (1982-2012)
Month	Jan	Feb	Mar	Apr	May	Jun	Jul	Aug	Sep	Oct	Nov	Dec	Year
Mean daily maximum °C	3.9	7	12.2	17	22.4	26.2	28.5	28.6	24.7	17.8	10.4	5.4	17.0
Mean daily minimum °C	−2.4	−0.1	2.8	6.8	10.8	14.3	16	15.7	12.3	7.8	3.5	−0.4	7.3
Average rainfall mm	84	75	73	75	80	54	49	47	69	87	110	101	904
Mean daily maximum °F	39.0	45	54.0	63	72.3	79.2	83.3	83.5	76.5	64.0	50.7	41.7	62.7
Mean daily minimum °F	27.7	31.8	37.0	44.2	51.4	57.7	61	60.3	54.1	46.0	38.3	31.3	45.1
Average rainfall inches	3.3	3.0	2.9	3.0	3.1	2.1	1.9	1.9	2.7	3.4	4.3	4.0	35.6
Source: Climate Data
