= List of villages in Pristina =

This is a list of the villages in the Municipality of Pristina, Kosovo.

== Villages ==
- Ballaban
- Barilevë
- Besi
- Busi
- Çagllavicë
- Dabishec
- Dragoc
- Drenoc
- Gllogovicë
- Grashticë
- Hajkobillë
- Keçekollë
- Koliq
- Kolovicë
- Kukavicë
