= Motorways in Kosovo =

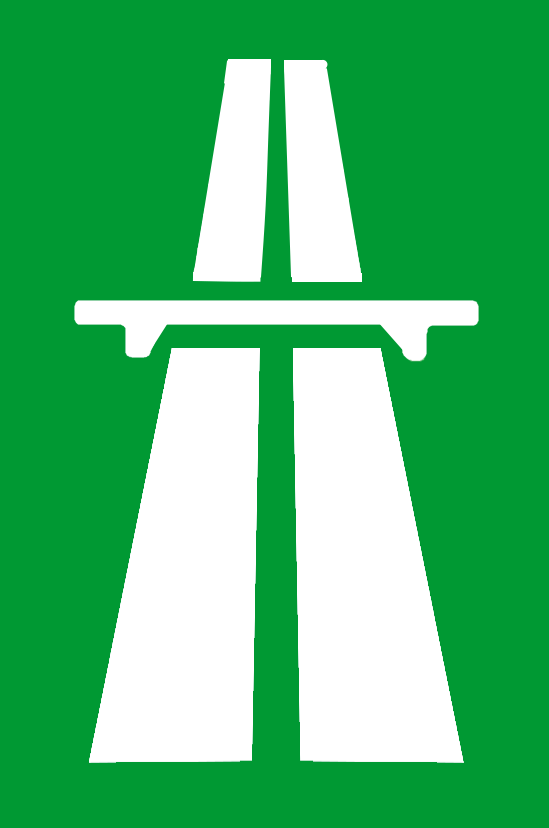
The sign for the motorways

The Motorways in Kosovo (Albanian: Autoudhë; Serbian: Autoput) are the controlled-access highway system in the Kosovo, that are predominantly under the supervision of the Ministry of Infrastructure. The motorways are defined as roads with at least two lanes in each direction including an emergency lane and a speed limit of 130 kilometres per hour (81 mph).

The motorways in Kosovo are marked with a special road sign, similar to the road sign depicting a motorway in other countries of Europe. The markings has green background and are identified as consisting of letter R and the motorway number assigned by the legislation.

== Motorways ==
=== Completed ===
| Motorway | Districts | Length | Description | Cities |
|---|---|---|---|---|
| R 6 (Kosovo) | Ferizaj, Pristina | 60 km (37 mi) | The R 6 (Albanian: Autostrada R 6, Serbian: Autoput R 6) is a four traffic lane motorway, spanning 60 km (37 mi). The motorway is completely constructed. It connects Pristina with the city of Skopje in the Republic of North Macedonia via the border crossing in Hani i Elezit. | Ferizaj, Fushë Kosova, Lipjan, Pristina |
| R 7 Motorway (Kosovo) | Pristina, Prizren | 129.8 km (80.7 mi) | The R 7 (Albanian: Autostrada R 7, Serbian: Autoput R 9) is a four traffic lane motorway, spanning 129.8 km (80.7 mi). The motorway is completely constructed. It connects Pristina with the city of Durrës in Albania via the border crossing in Vërmica. | Pristina, Prizren, Suva Reka |

=== Under Construction ===
| Motorway | District | Length | Description | Cities | Scheduled completion |
|---|---|---|---|---|---|
| R 7.1 (Kosovo) | Gjilan, Pristina | 47.1 km (29.3 mi) | The R 7.1 (Albanian: Autostrada R 7.1, Serbian: Autoput R 7.1) is a four traffic lane motorway, spanning 47.1 km (29.3 mi). The motorway is currently under construction and will connect the east of Kosovo with the west of the country through the cities of Gjilan, Pristina and Kamenica. | Gjilan, Kamenica, Lipjan, Pristina | 2028 - 1st Section |

=== Future projects ===
| Motorway | District | Length | Section | Description | Scheduled completion |
|---|---|---|---|---|---|
| Prizren-Tetovo Highway | Prizren | 35 km (22 mi) | Prizren – Tetovo | The construction of the motorway between Prizren and Tetovo in North Macedonia is under planning process. | – |
| Autostrada Peja – Prizren | Gjakova, Peja, Prizren | 65 km (40 mi) | Peja – Prizren | The construction of the motorway between Peja and Prizren is under planning process. | – |
| Autostrada Suhareka– Lipjan | Prizren Ferizaj Pristina | 31 km (19 mi) | Suhareka – Lipjan | The construction of the motorway between Suhareka and Lipjan is under planning process. | – |

== See also ==
- Highways in Kosovo
- Transport in Kosovo
- Economy of Kosovo
