= Svirce =

Svirce may refer to:

- Svirce (Medveđa), a village in Serbia
- Svirce (Leskovac), a village in Serbia
