= R 7 (Kosovo) =

Motorway in Kosovo

R7 Motorway
- Albanian: Autostrada R 7 Serbian: Autoput R 7 Serbian Cyrillic: Аутопут 7
- Ibrahim Rugova
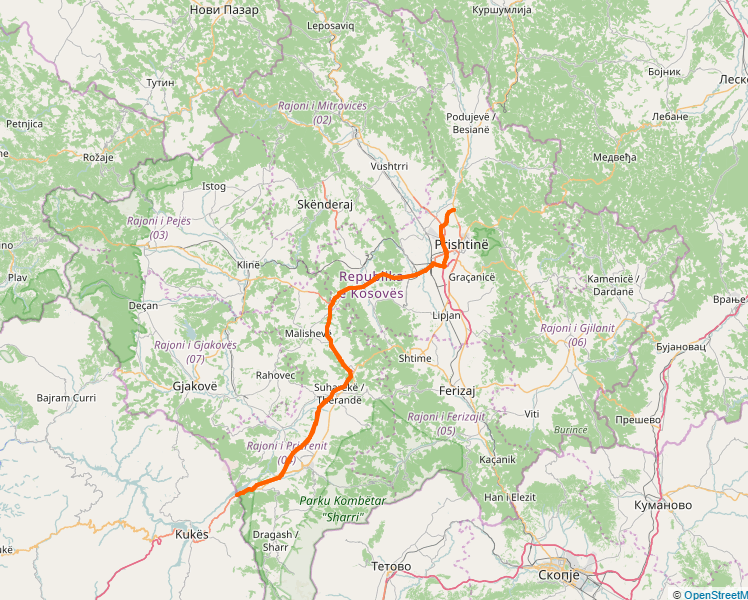
- [[File: |290px|alt=The R 7 runs through southwest and northeast Kosovo.]] in use

Route information
- Part of E65, E80, E851
- Maintained by Ministria e Infrastrukturës
- Length: 129.8 km (80.7 mi)

Major junctions
- Southwest end: in Albania (end); R7 in Vërmica (start)
- Northeast end: M25 in Pristina (currently); State Road 35 (Serbia) in Merdare (future)

Location
- Districts: Pristina, Prizren
- Major cities: Drenas, Kosovo Polje, Malisheva, Obiliq, Podujevë, Pristina, Prizren, Suva Reka

Highway system
- Roads in Kosovo

The R 7 Motorway (Albanian: Autostrada R 7; Serbian: Autoput R 7), also commonly known as Autostrada Ibrahim Rugova, is the longest motorway in the Republic of Kosovo running 129.8 kilometres (80.7 mi) in the districts of Pristina and Prizren. It consists of two traffic lanes and an emergency lane in each driving direction separated by a central reservation.

The motorway constitutes part of a larger corridor connecting the Albanian Adriatic Sea Coast in the southeast across the Albanian Alps in the northeast of Albania with Kosovo in the southwest. As portion of the European routes E60, E80 and E851, it will be part of the Pan-European Corridor X. It is named in honour of the Albanian politician, activist and former President of Kosovo, Ibrahim Rugova.

The significance of the Albania-Kosovo motorway is reflected through its positive economic and cultural impact on the towns and cities within both countries it connects as well as its importance to economy of Kosovo. The construction of the motorway has rapidly increased as well as the level of transport in both countries.

As part of the European route E851, it is the first motorway constructed in Kosovo linking the Albania border at the village of Vërmica with the capital Pristina. Construction of the motorway started in April 2010. It was finished in 2013 with the Vërmica-Pristina segment ending in Gjurgjica at the M9. The highway is seen as part of the larger Vërmica-Merdare corridor ending at the Merdare border crossing with Serbia in eastern Kosovo. R 7 is 101 km long at a cost of €824 million. This highway, along with the A1 Motorway in Albania, have set the travel time from Pristina to Tirana to 3 hours. Once the remaining E80 Pristina-Merdare section project will be finalized and completed, the motorway will link Kosovo through the present E80 highway with the Pan-European corridor X (E75) near Niš.

== Description ==
The R 7 Motorway represent a major southwest–northeast motorway in Kosovo connecting the Albanian Adriatic Sea Coast in the southwest across the Albanian Alps to Kosovo. It constitutes part of the European route E851 starting from Montenegro across Albania to Pristina, the European route E65 starting from Sweden to Greece and the European route E80 starting from Portugal to Turkey.

The motorway can be broadly categorised into two sections namely the southwestern section, from Morinë to Pristina, and the northeastern section, from Pristina to Merdare, respectively. The southwestern section is largely completed while the northeastern section is currently under construction. When the northeastern section will be completed, the motorway will be part of the Pan-European Corridor X connecting Durrës in Albania with Niš in Serbia.

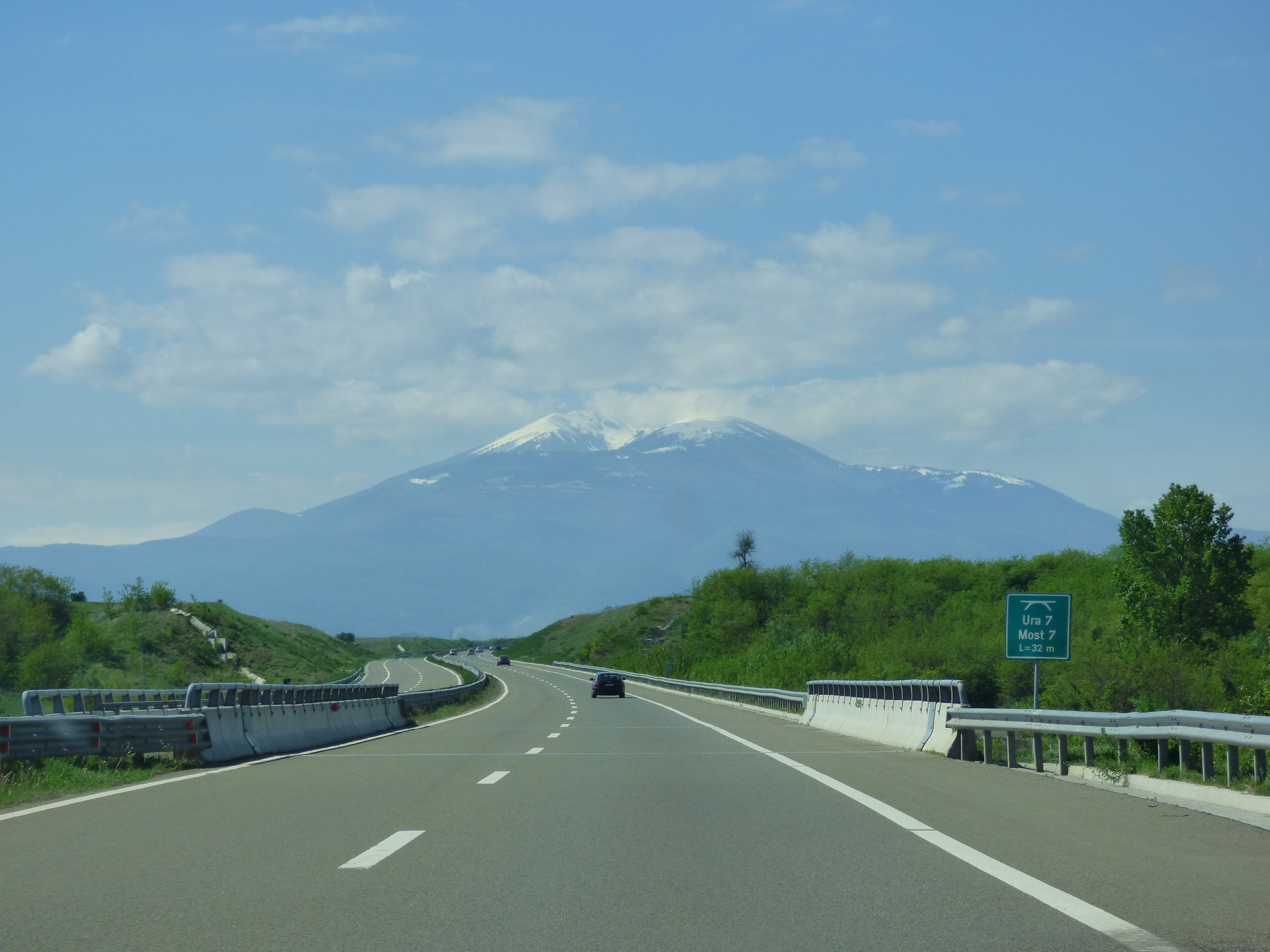
R 7 Motorway near Malisheva

The motorway spans 129.8 kilometers (80.7 mi) between Vërmica at the border crossing with Albania and Pristina. The route serves Prizren via M25 and Malisheva, Fushë Kosova and Pristina via M9.

== History ==
Since the end of the Kosovo War of 1999, hundreds of thousands of Albanians have passed through the poor old mountain road to get to Albania's beaches. It was clear that building a highway in both sides would "crystallize a year-round tourism industry and double the size of the Albanian market", while allowing both communities to rationalize agriculture. Construction of the Albanian side began in 2007 and that of the Kosovo side in 2010. After both motorways were completed in 2010 and 2013 respectively, travel times have been lowered to two and a half hours or less, down from seven.

The initial offer was to complete the Kosovo section of the highway for $555m (€400m). The price subsequently rose to $916m (€660m), to pay for 102 km of road. In the end, the project cost $1.13bn (€820m) for what turned out be only a 77 km stretch of highway.

Once finalized, the project will link the Adriatic Sea with the Pan-European corridor X at the E80 near the town of Merdar between Kosovo-Serbia border.

== Exit list ==
No.	Type	Name	Connections	Destinations
	Beginning of, Vërmica, at border with Albania			
1		Vërmica		Connection to the village of Vërmica, Shkoz and Zhur
2		Prizren south		Connection to the south of Prizren and Skopje, North Macedonia
3		Prizren north		Connection to the north of Prizren, Peja, and Gjakova
4		Suharekë		Connection to Suharekë
5		Duhël		Connection to Duhël and Shtime
6		Malisheva		Connection to Malisheva
7		Arllat		Connection to Klina, Peja
8	End of, the road continues as for 24 km (interchanges to Gjurgjica, Sllatine e Madhe and Kosovo Polje are available)			
9		Kosovo Polje		Connection to Pristina and Kosovo Polje
10		Pristina south		Connection to R 6 Motorway, Hani i Elezit and Skopje, North Macedonia
11		Pristina northwest		Connection to Pristina Northwest and Mitrovica
12	End of, the road continues as /E80 to Podujevë and Merdare (border with Serbia)			

== See also ==
- Motorways in Kosovo
- Transport in Kosovo
- Economy of Kosovo
