= Xhaferi =

Xhaferi is an Albanian surname. Notable people with the name include:

- Arbën Xhaferi (1948–2012), Albanian politician
- Talat Xhaferi (born 1962), Macedonian politician, former Minister of Defense and former Speaker of the Parliament
