= Transport in Kosovo =

Map of Kosovo

Transport in Kosovo consists of transport by land and air. After the Kosovo's independence, improvements to the road infrastructure, urban transport, rail transport and air travel have all led to a vast improvement in transportation. These upgrades have played a key role in supporting Kosovo's economy.

== Air Transport ==
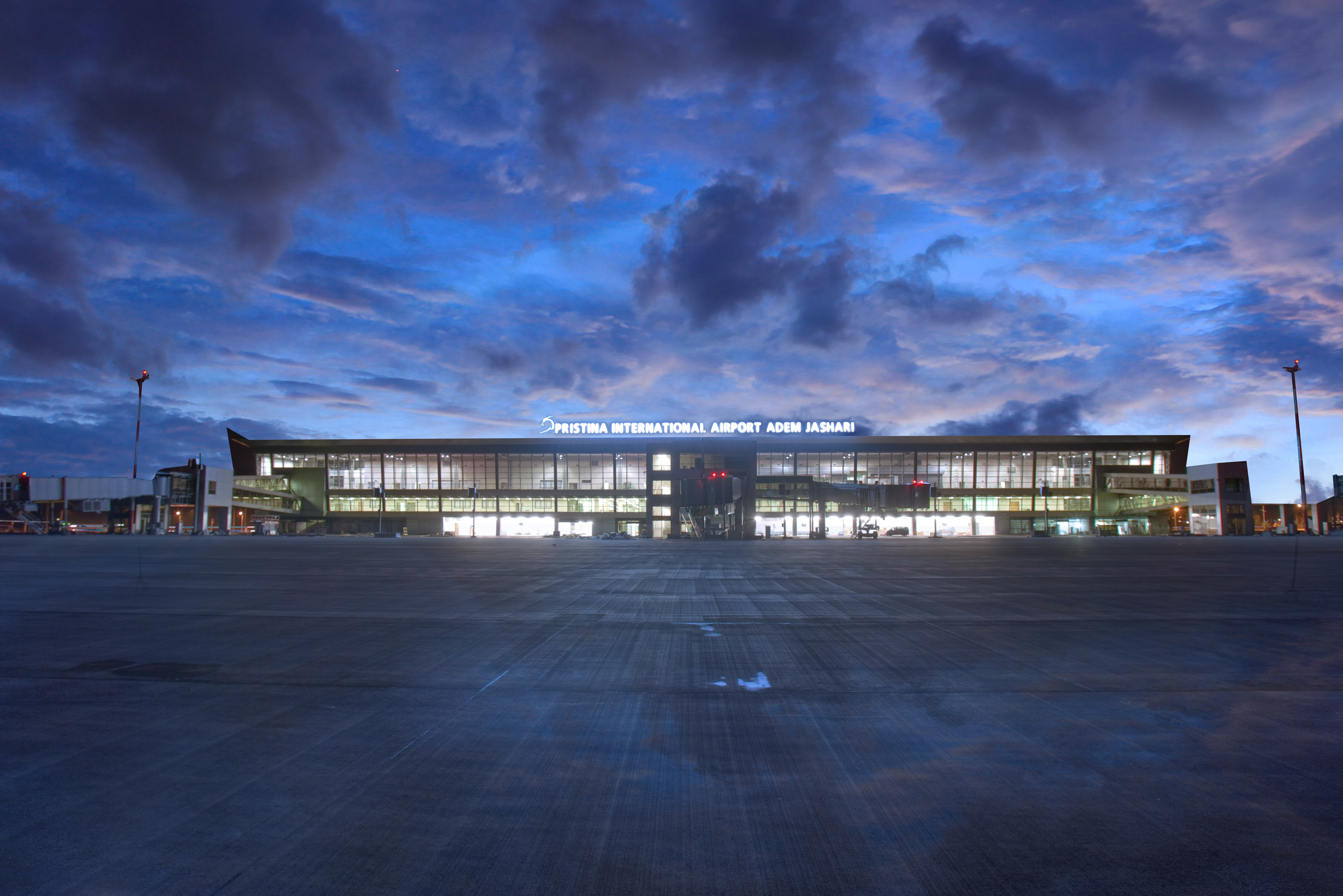
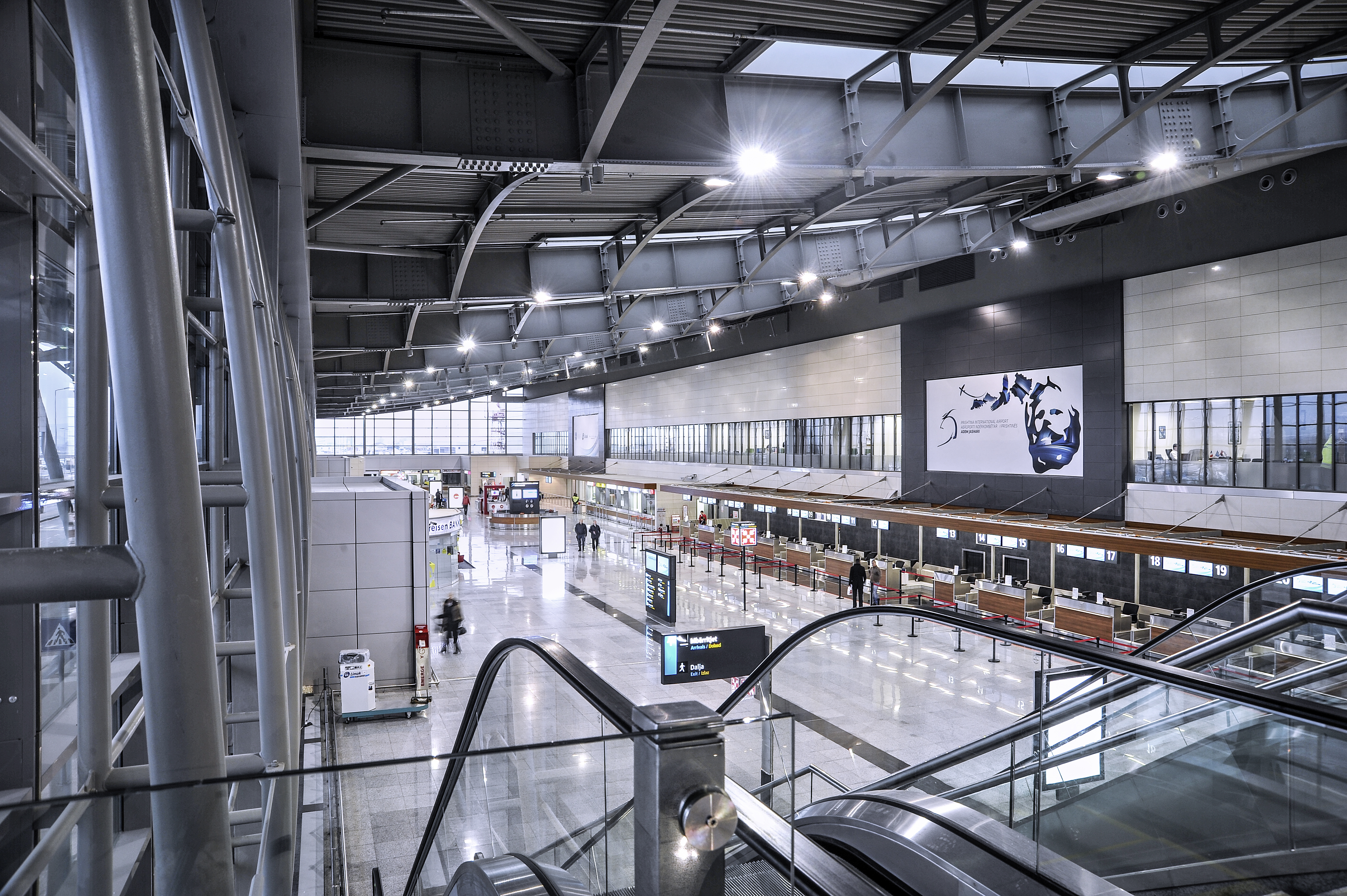
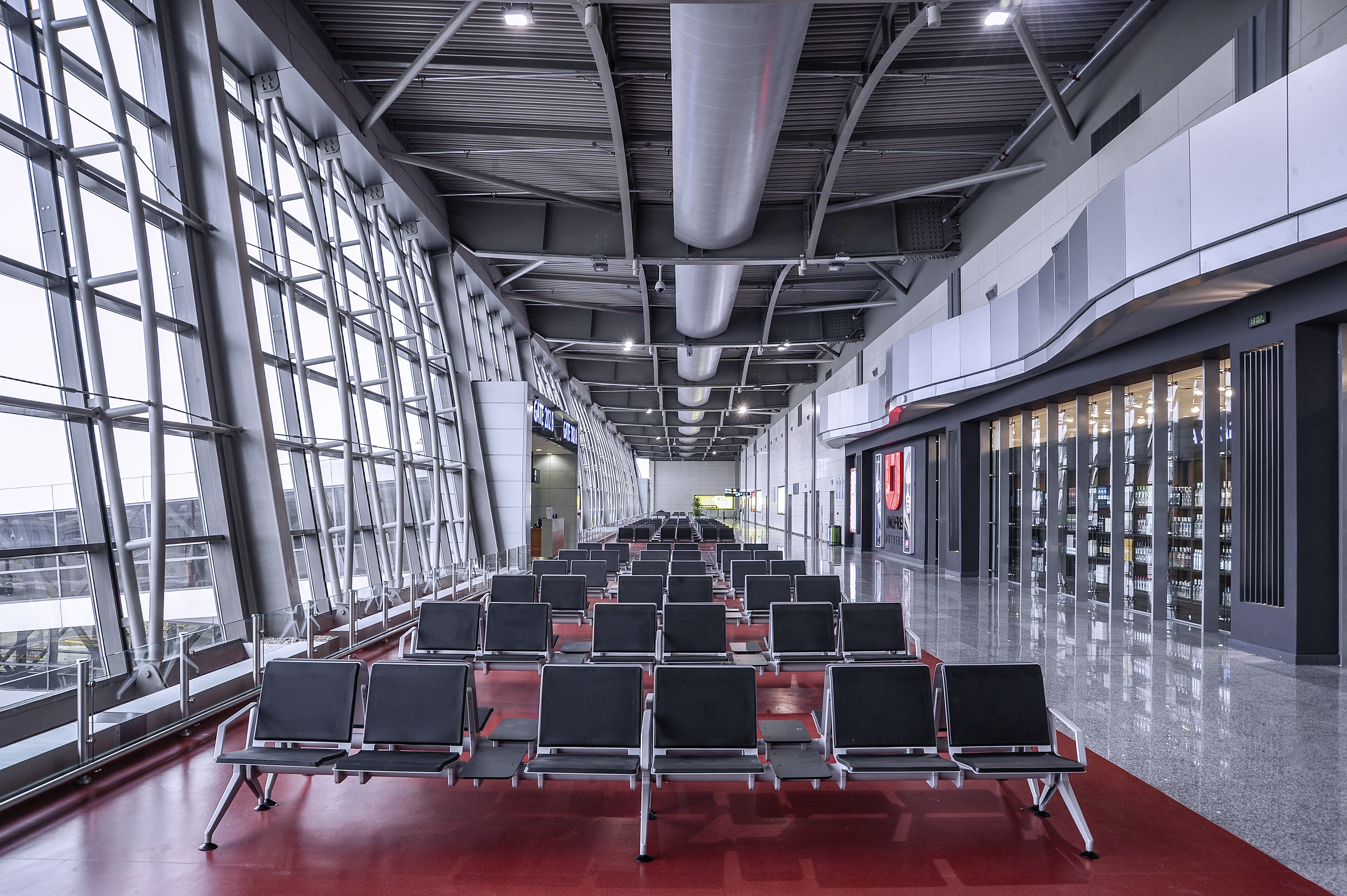
The Pristina International Airport was named in honour of Adem Jashari, one of founders of the Kosovo Liberation Army, which fought for the secession of Kosovo from the Federal Republic of Yugoslavia during the 1990s.

Air transport in Kosovo started as early as 1936 when Yugoslav flag carrier Aeroput opened scheduled flights from Belgrade to Skopje through Podujevë airfield as mid stop.

There are three Airports situated in Kosovo, the Gjakova Airport in the city of Gjakova, Dumosh-Batllava Airfield in Podujevë and the only international Airport of Pristina in the capital of Kosovo, Pristina. Gjakova's Airport was built by the Kosovo Force (KFOR) following the Kosovo War, next to an existing airfield used for agricultural purposes, and was used mainly for military and humanitarian flights. The local and national government plans to offer Gjakova Airport for operation under a public-private partnership with the aim of turning it into a civilian and commercial airport.

Pristina International Airport is located southwest of Pristina. It is Kosovo's only international airport, the only port of entry for air travelers to Kosovo. Handling over 2.99 million (2021 2.86 million) passengers per year on 22,000 flights.

== Rail Transport ==
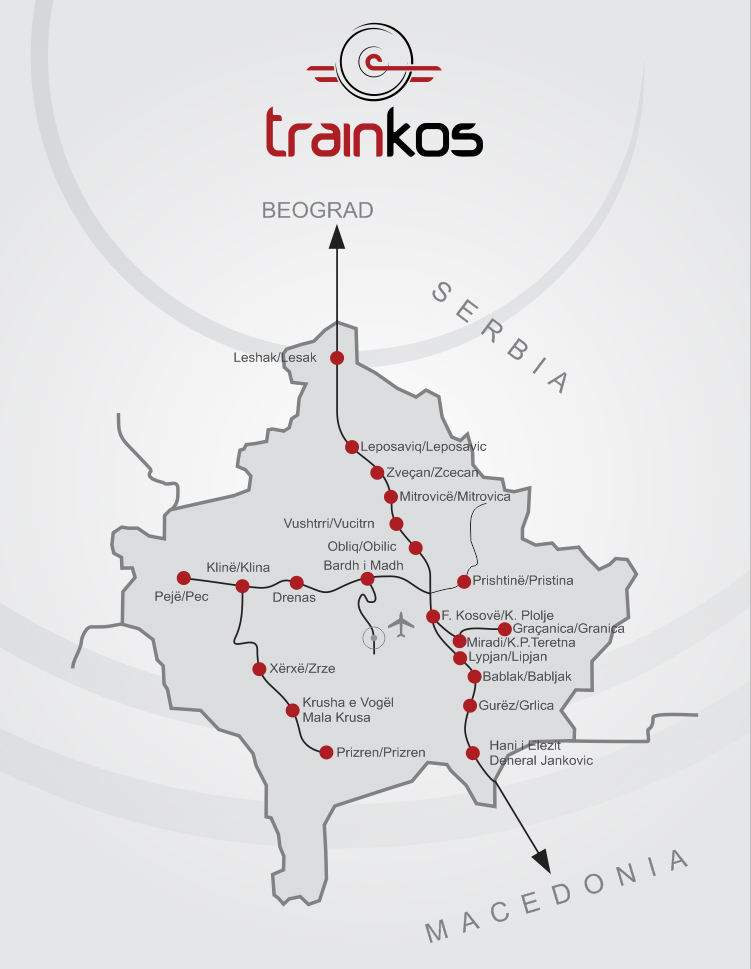
Map showing the rail system of Kosovo

The first railway line in what is now Kosovo was built under Ottoman rule by the Compagnie des Chemins de Fer Orientaux (CO), led by Maurice de Hirsch. The line was constructed from Thessaloniki through Skopje to Mitrovica, with the Thessaloniki–Skopje section opening in 1873 and the extension to Mitrovica completed in 1874. After the Balkan Wars, the railway infrastructure in Kosovo came under Serbian state control. It was subsequently operated by the Yugoslav Railways during the existence of Yugoslavia and by Serbian Railways after the breakup of Yugoslavia. Serbian railway operations in Kosovo ended in 1999 following the Kosovo War.

Kosovo's railway network is managed by Infrakos, the infrastructure manager, while Trainkos operates passenger and freight railway services. Infrakos currently manages 335.079 km of railway infrastructure within Kosovo, including the country's railway border points. The network is connected to the railway networks of North Macedonia and Serbia.

The network is non-electrified and is predominantly standard gauge (1,435 mm (4 ft 8 1/2 in)). Its principal north–south route is Rail Route 10, extending from the border with Serbia near Lešak through Mitrovica, Fushë Kosovë, Pristina, Ferizaj and Hani i Elezit to the border with North Macedonia. The railway network also includes the Fushë Kosovë–Peja line, the Klinë–Prizren branch and other branch and industrial lines.

Rail Route 10 is being rehabilitated in three phases. The approximately 149 km route extends from the Serbian border at Lešak to the North Macedonian border at Hani i Elezit. Phase 1 covers Fushë Kosovë–Hani i Elezit, Phase 2 covers Fushë Kosovë–Mitrovica, and Phase 3 covers Mitrovica–Lešak. As of 2026, Phase 1 is under implementation with a planned completion date of December 2027, Phase 2 is also under implementation with a planned completion date of December 2028, while Phase 3 remains in preparation.

The rehabilitation of Route 10 has been supported by the European Investment Bank, the European Bank for Reconstruction and Development and grants from the European Union. The EIB has provided a total of €80 million in loans for the project, while the overall modernisation programme involves substantially larger investment and international grant financing.

Passenger and freight operations are currently limited compared with the historical extent of the network. Trainkos operates passenger services on the Pristina–Peja route and publishes timetables for the Pristina–Skopje international connection and the Fushë Kosovë–Hani i Elezit route, although services on sections undergoing Route 10 rehabilitation have been subject to interruption.

The railway line north of Mitrovica toward Serbia has not had regular train services since 2020. In September 2026, Infrakos announced that it had taken full management control of its railway assets in northern Kosovo, including the stations at Zvečan, Leposavić, Lešak and Slatina. The takeover restored Infrakos's administrative control over the infrastructure but did not constitute the resumption of railway services.

Plans have also been developed to improve Kosovo's railway connection with Albania, including proposals for a railway connection between Pristina and Durrës through the existing network in Kosovo and Albania. However, this connection has not been constructed and is therefore not part of the current railway network.

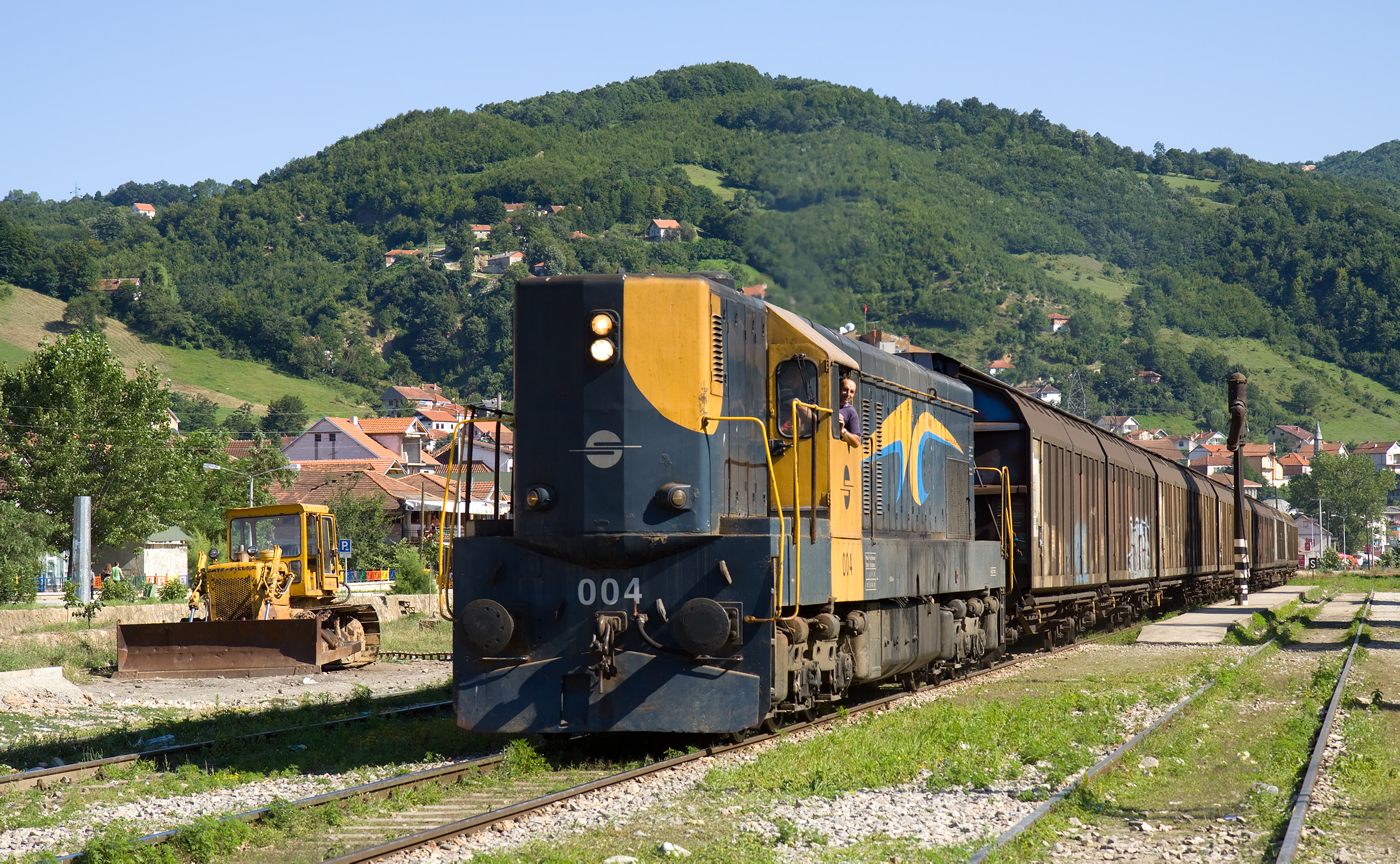
A freight train in Kaçanik

== Road Transport ==
The road transport in Kosovo has significantly improved following the independence of Kosovo. The government of Kosovo in recent years has focused the majority of investments on the construction of numerous motorways specifically on constructing the R6, R7 and R7.1 which connect Kosovo with its neighboring countries.

In recent years, two major road construction spree took place on the main state roads of Kosovo, involving the construction of new roadways, putting of contemporary signs, planting of trees, and related greening projects. Works on two highways are completed.

In 2021 there was an average of 181 cars per 1,000 people in Kosovo compared with 567 in the EU.

=== Motorways ===
| Motorway | District | Length | Description | Cities |
|---|---|---|---|---|
| R 6 (Kosovo) | Ferizaj, Pristina | 60 km (37 mi) | The R 6 (Albanian: Autostrada R 6, Serbian: Autoput R 6) is a four traffic lane motorway, spanning 60 km (37 mi). The majority of the motorway is completed but still under construction. It connect the city of Pristina with the city of Skopje in North Macedonia at the border in Hani i Elezit. | Ferizaj, Kosovo Polje, Lipjan, Pristina |
| R 7 (Kosovo) | Pristina, Prizren | 129.8 km (80.7 mi) | The R 7 (Albanian: Autostrada R 7, Serbian: Autoput R 9) is a four traffic lane motorway, spanning 129.8 km (80.7 mi). The majority of the motorway is completed but still under construction. It connect the city of Pristina with the city of Durrës in Albania at the border in Vërmica. | Pristina, Prizren, Suva Reka |
| R 7.1 (Kosovo) | Gjilan, Pristina | 47.1 km (29.3 mi) | The R 7.1 (Albanian: Autostrada R 7.1, Serbian: Autoput R 7.1) is a four traffic lane motorway, spanning 47.1 km (29.3 mi). The motorway is currently under construction and still under planning process and will connect the east with the west from Kosovo through the cities of Gjilan, Pristina and Kamenica. | Gjilan, Kamenica, Lipjan, Pristina, |

== See Also ==
- Economy of Kosovo
- Geography of Kosovo
- Transport in Prishtina
- Vehicle registration plates of Kosovo
