= M-9 (Kosovo) =

Highway connecting east and west Kosovo

M9 highway
- Albanian: Magjistrale 9 Serbian: Magistralni put 9 Serbian Cyrillic: Магистрални пут 9
- Rruga Prishtinë - Pejë, N9

Route information
- Part of E851
- Maintained by Ministria e Infrastruktures

Major junctions
- West end: R9 in Montenegro (start)
- Bogë Peja Kline Gjurgjice Gllogovac Sllatine e Madhe Prishtina Airport "Adem Jashari" Miradi e Poshtme Uglare Fushe Kosova Prishtina to Podujeva Llukare Prapashtice
- East end: 39 in Serbia, Medvece (end)

Location
- Districts: Pristina, Prizren, Peja

Highway system
- Roads in Kosovo

The M9 (Albanian: Nacionale 9, Serbian: Magistralni put 9) also commonly known as Rruga Prishtinë-Pejë and N9 is a road which connects the eastern and western part of Kosovo. It starts from the border with Montenegro, passes through cities such as Peja and Pristina, and ends at the Serbian border. The road is 143 kilometers long.

== Route ==
The M9 begins at the closed Montenegro-Kosovo border, at Kuqishte. It passes through Peja and Pristina, offering scenic views and good road conditions. At Gjergjicë, it connects to R7, widening to 2x2 lanes. In Pristina, it intersects with the M2 road at a roundabout, commonly known to locals as the "Duplex Roundabout." After Pristina, it continues as a 1x1 road through the Gollak mountains and ends at Prapashticë.

== History ==
The N9 once linked the M2 in Montenegro to Pirot, spanning three countries. Notably, the Peja-Pristina section was crucial. The road has been renamed from M9 to N9, but it is unknown when this happened. The Montenegrin part of the ex-Yugoslavian road is called R-9 nowadays.
