= Ademaj =

Ademaj is a surname. Notable people with the surname include:

- Eshref Ademaj (1940–1994), Albanian mathematician and education activist
- Ndriçim Ademaj (born 1991), Kosovar Albanian poet
