= M-2 (Kosovo) =

Road in Kosovo

M2 highway
- Albanian: Magjistrale 2 Serbian: Magistralni put 2 Serbian Cyrillic: Магистрални пут 2
- N2 Rruga:Mitrovicë-Prishtinë-Kaçanik-Shkup

Route information
- Part of E65 E80
- Maintained by Ministria e Infrastruktures

Major junctions
- Northwest end: 32 in Serbia, Vitkovića (start)
- Zubin Potok Mitrovica Prishtina Çagllavicë Lipjan Ferizaj Kaçanik Han I Elezit
- South-southeast end: A4 in North Macedonia, Blace (end)

Location
- Districts: Mitrovica, Pristina, Ferizaj

Highway system
- Roads in Kosovo

The M2 (Albanian: Nacionale 2, Serbian: Magistralni put 2) also commonly known as Rruga Mitrovicë-Prishtinë, Rruga Prishtinë-Shkup and N2 is a road which connects the northwestern and southeast part of Kosovo. It starts from the border with Serbia at Brnjak, passes through cities such as Mitrovica, Pristina and Ferizaj, and ends at the Macedonian border at Hani i Elezit. The road is 135 kilometers long.

== Route ==
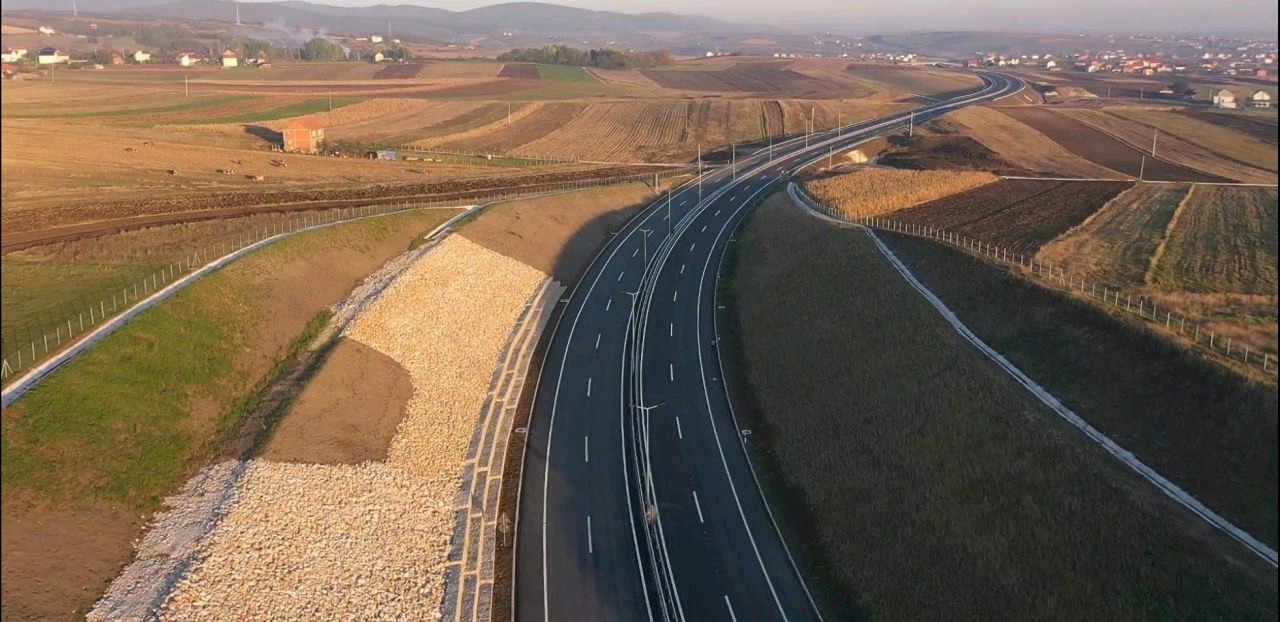
Newly constructed part of the M-2 road

The M2 begins at the Serbia-Kosovo border, at Brnjak. It passes by Ujmani Lake. The environment is mountainous until Mitrovica, which connects to the M22.3 highway. The M2 highway continues to Pristina, where construction is ongoing to extend the road until Vushtria, where a bypass is being constructed. After Vushtria, it widens to a 2x2 road. In Pristina, it intersects with the M9 road at a roundabout, commonly known to locals as the "Duplex Roundabout." The road remains a 2x2 road until the Kacanik Gorge, where the road narrows to a 1x1, and tunnels become very common. At Hani i Elezit, a roundabout connects the M2 with the R6 highway, and ends at the Hani i Elezit border.

== History ==
The N2, once the M2, was a major Yugoslavian road from Italy to Greece. After the breakup of Yugoslavia, it was renumbered in Slovenia, Croatia, Montenegro, and North Macedonia. Bosnia and Herzegovina and Kosovo still keep the name as M2. The road has been renamed from M2 to N2, but it is unknown when this happened.
