= M-25 (Kosovo) =

Road in Kosovo

M25 highway
- Albanian: Magjistrale 25; Serbian: Magistralni put 25; Serbian Cyrillic: Магистрални пут 25
- Rruga Prizren-Prishtine, Rruga Prishtine-Podujeve, Rruga Prizren-Suha Reke, N25

Route information
- Part of E80
- Maintained by Ministria e Infrastruktures

Major junctions
- Northeast end: 35 in Serbia, Vitkovića (start)
- Podujeve Prugoc Trude Pristina Lipjan Shtime Duhel Suha Reka Prizren Brezovica Zhur Vermice
- Southwest end: A1 in Albania, Morine. (end)

Location
- Districts: Pristina, Ferizaj, Prizren

Highway system
- Roads in Kosovo

The M25 (Albanian: Nacionale 25, Serbian: Magistralni put 25) also commonly known as Rruga Prizren-Prishtine, Rruga Prishtine-Podujeve, Rruga Prizren-Suha Reke and N25 is a road which connects the northeastern and southwestern part of Kosovo. It starts from the border with Serbia, passes through cities such as Podujeva, Pristina, Lipjan, Suha Reka and Prizren and ends at the Albanian border. The road is 130 kilometers long.

== Route ==
The M25 starts at the border with Serbia as a 1x1 road, with most of the road up to Prishtina being unpaved due to construction. In Prishtina, the road becomes a 2x2 road until the exit at Lipjan, where it becomes a 1x1 road again. Between Shtime and Suha Reka, there are many wooded hills. When you enter Suha Reka, the road becomes a 2x2 and continues like that up to the Albanian border.

== History ==
The M-25 was the only road which connected Yugoslavia with Albania. After the independence of Kosovo, this road was very important since many Kosovar Albanians traveled to Albania for their summer break. After the construction of the R7 motorway, the road lost a lot of traffic, but it is still used today by many people.

The road has been renamed from M25 to N25, but it is unknown when this happened.
