= M-9.1 (Kosovo) =

M9.1 highway
- Albanian: Magjistrale 9.1; Serbian: Magistralni put 9.1; Serbian Cyrillic: Магистрални пут 9.1
- Rruga Klinë - Gjakovë

Route information
- Maintained by Ministria e Infrastruktures

Major junctions
- West end: M9 in Klina. (start)
- Klina Gjakova Morine
- Southwest end: SH22 in Albania, Qafe Morine (end)

Location
- Districts: Peja, Gjakova

Highway system
- Roads in Kosovo

The M9.1 (Albanian: Nacionale 9.1, Serbian: Magistralni put 9.1) also commonly known as Rruga Klinë-Gjakovë and N9.1 is a road which connects the western and southwestern part of Kosovo. It starts from the M9-M9.1 junction, passes through cities such as Peja Gjakova and Morina, and ends at the Albanian border. The road is 53 kilometers long.

== Route ==
The M9.1 begins at the junction of the M9 and M9.1 road. The road is a 2x2 road but only for a short length, where the rest of the road continues as an 1x1 road. In Gjakova, it is a narrow city road. The road ends at the Albanian border at Morine.

== History ==
During Yugoslavian times, the road was very insignificant. It was a dirt-paved road, but was important to the city of Gjakova. In 2008–2009, the road became asphalted. After Kosovo's independence, the road still was called as M-9.1. The road in recent years has been renumbered to N-9.1, it its unknown when this happened.
