= Busi, Kosovo =

Village in Pristina, Kosovo

Busi
- Village
- Interactive map of Busi
- Country: Kosovo
- District: Pristina
- Municipality: Pristina

Population (2024)
  - Total: 577
- Time zone: UTC+1 (CET)
  - Summer (DST): UTC+2 (CEST)

Busi is a village in the municipality of Pristina, Kosovo.

== See also ==
- List of villages in Pristina
