= Svircë =

Svircë Свирце
- Village
- Country: Kosovo
- District: Gjilan
- Municipality: Kamenica

Population (2024)
  - Total: 13
- Time zone: UTC+1
  - Summer (DST): UTC+2

Svircë (Serbian Cyrillic: Свирце) is a village in Kamenica municipality, Kosovo. It is located in the Gollak mountains.

Part of the village of Svirce is located in Serbia.

== Demographics ==
As of 2011 this village has 59 inhabitants. All of them are Albanian.
