= Glloboçica =

Glloboçica: Glloboçicë (Albanian); Глобочица/Globočica (Serbian)
- Interactive map of Glloboçica
- Location in Kosovo
- Country: Kosovo
- District: Ferizaj
- Municipality: Kaçanik

Population (2024)
  - Total: 818
- Time zone: UTC+1 (CET)
  - Summer (DST): UTC+2 (CEST)

Glloboçica or Glloboçicë (Serbian: Globočica / Глобочица) is a settlement in Municipality of Kaçanik, Kosovo on the border with North Macedonia. It contains a border crossing on the Regional road R116 (Kosovo site) from Tetovo to Pristina.
