= Ballaban, Kosovo =

Village in Pristina, Kosovo

Ballaban
- Village
- Interactive map of Ballaban
- Country: Kosovo
- District: Pristina
- Municipality: Pristina

Population (2024)
  - Total: 167
- Time zone: UTC+1 (CET)
  - Summer (DST): UTC+2 (CEST)

Ballaban is a village in the municipality of Pristina, Kosovo.

== See also ==
- List of villages in Pristina
