= Prizren-Tetovo Highway =

The Prizren-Tetovo Highway is a proposed infrastructure project aimed at enhancing connectivity between Kosovo and North Macedonia. This 45-kilometer-long highway is set to link the city of Prizren in Kosovo with Tetovo in North Macedonia, significantly reducing the current travel distance of over 100 kilometers between the two cities.

== History ==
The project involves constructing a highway that will integrate with the existing Macedonian M-4 motorway. A notable engineering feature of the highway is a 6 kilometer-long tunnel through the Šar Mountain range, an area currently lacking comprehensive transportation infrastructure. This tunnel will enable the highway to traverse the challenging terrain, creating a new corridor for transportation.

Funding for the highway includes an investment of over 400 million euros from investors in the United Arab Emirates, as announced by Kosovo's Infrastructure Minister, Lutfi Zharku. The construction of the highway is contingent upon the completion of the Autostrada R 6, another significant infrastructure project in the region.

The highway is expected to facilitate economic activities by improving access for businesses and industries and enhancing trade and tourism. Local markets in Prizren and Tetovo may benefit from increased traffic and commerce, contributing to the economic development of both regions.

Additionally, the highway has geopolitical significance as it represents a collaborative effort between Kosovo and North Macedonia, potentially strengthening bilateral relations and promoting regional integration within the Western Balkans.

While the project is still in the planning stages and has yet to begin construction, its anticipated impact includes improved transportation efficiency, economic growth, and enhanced regional connectivity. The Prizren-Tetovo Highway is seen as a strategic infrastructure development that aligns with broader European infrastructural and economic objectives.

== See also ==
- Motorways in Kosovo
