= R 7.1 (Kosovo) =

Motorway under construction in Kosovo

R7.1 Motorway
- Albanian: Autostrada R 7.1; Serbian: Autoput R 7.1; Serbian Cyrillic: Аутопут 7.1
- Autostrada Prishtinë - Gjilan - Dheu i Bardhë

Route information
- Length: 47.1 km (29.3 mi)

Major junctions
- North end: Banullë
- South end: Dheu i Bardhë at the Serbian border

Location
- Major cities: Lipjan, Gjilan

Highway system
- Roads in Kosovo

The R 7.1 Motorway (Albanian: Autostrada R 7.1; Serbian: Autoput R 7.1) is a motorway under construction in Kosovo. Once completed, it will run for 47.1 kilometres (29.3 mi), connecting the districts of Gjilan and Pristina. The motorway is also known under the name Autostrada Prishtinë–Gjilan.

== History ==
The motorway was first presented on July of 2016 by the Minister of Infrastructure, Lutfi Zharku, and the construction of the motorway began in April 2018.

Despite being inaugurated on several occasions by Kurti’s cabinets, the motorway remains unfinished. According to officials from the Ministry of Infrastructure, various problems have arisen, including landslides, the restructuring of contracts, and an increase in the areas subject to expropriation.

== See also ==
- Motorways in Kosovo
- Transport in Kosovo
- Economy of Kosovo
