= Barilevë =

Barilevë: Barilevë (Albanian); Бариљево/Bariljevo (Serbian)
- Village
- Interactive map of Barilevë
- Coordinates: 42.754423°N 21.119110°E
- Country: Kosovo
- District: Pristina
- Municipality: Pristina
- Elevation: 525 m (1,722 ft)

Population (2024)
  - Total: 1,893
- Time zone: UTC+1 (CET)
  - Summer (DST): UTC+2 (CEST)

Barilevë (Albanian: Barilevë, Serbian Cyrillic: Бариљево/Bariljevo) is a village in Pristina municipality.

== See also ==
- List of villages in Pristina
