= M22.3 (Kosovo) =

Highway connecting north and south Kosovo

M22.3 highway
- Albanian: Magjistrale 22.3; Serbian: Magistralni put 22.3; Serbian Cyrillic: Магистрални пут 22.3
- Rruga Mitrovicë-Leposaviq

Route information
- Maintained by Ministria e Infrastruktures

Major junctions
- North end: 32 in Serbia, Plavkovo
- Jarinje Leposaviq
- South end: M-2 in Shkupovc, Mitrovica

Location
- Districts: Mitrovica
- Major cities: Jarinjë, Leposaviç, Mitrovica

Highway system
- Roads in Kosovo

The M22.3 (Albanian: Nacionale 22.3, Serbian: Magistralni put 22.3) also commonly known as Rruga Mitrovicë-Leposaviq, and N22.3 is a road which connects north and south part of Kosovo. It starts from the border with Serbia at Jarinje, passes through cities such as Jarinje, Leposaviq and Mitrovica, and ends at the M-22.3 and M-2 junction. The road is 54 kilometers long.

== Route ==
The M22.3 begins at the Serbia-Kosovo border, at Jarinje. The terrain is mountainous, and forms the first part of the Mitrovica bypass. The road is a 1x1 road, with it being very narrow at some parts. The road runs parallel to the Ibar River, which made construction easier because of the Ibar River valley. The road ends at its junction with the M-2 highway.

== History ==
During Yugoslavian times, the road was very important due to it connecting the M22 with the M2. After Kosovo's independence, the road still was called as M-22.3. The road in recent years has been renumbered to N-22.3, it its unknown when this happened.
