= Dragoc =

Village in Kosovo

Llajshec
- Village
- Llajshec
- Interactive map of Llajshec
- Country: Kosovo
- District: Pristina
- Municipality: Pristina

Population (2024)
  - Total: 200
- Time zone: UTC+1 (CET)
  - Summer (DST): UTC+2 (CEST)

Llajshec is a village in the municipality of Pristina, Kosovo.

== See also ==
- List of villages in Pristina
