= M-25.3 (Kosovo) =

Road in Kosovo

M25.3 highway
- Albanian: Magjistrale 25.3; Serbian: Magistralni put 25.3; Serbian Cyrillic: Магистрални пут 25.3
- Rruga Gjilan-Ferizaj, N25.3, Joseph R. “Beau” Biden

Route information
- Maintained by Ministria e Infrastruktures

Major junctions
- West end: M25 in Shtime (start)
- Shtime Ferizaj Ferizaj Gjilan
- East end: 41 in Serbia, Končulj (end)

Location
- Districts: Pristina, Gjilan

Highway system
- Roads in Kosovo

The M25.3 (Albanian: Nacionale 25.3, Serbian: Magistralni put 25.3), also commonly known as Rruga Gjilan-Ferizaj and N25.3, is a road which connects the western and eastern parts of Kosovo. It starts from the M25 junction, passes through cities including as Shtime, Ferizaj and Gjilan, and ends at the Serbian border. The road is 79 kilometers long.

== Route ==
The M25.3 goes through flat terrain, up to Gjilan, which crosses many major junctions. Near Gjilan, it intersects with the N25.2 via a bypass road around the city, in order to navigate traffic. The road continues through wooded hills along the border with Serbia.

== History ==
During Yugoslavian times, the road was considered unimportant, and it was primarily used for its connections with the M25 and M2 motorways. As of 2019, the road was in poor condition due to disuse. The road was asphalted in 2017, but quickly developed issues with potholes and cracked asphalt. In 2016, the Gjilan-Ferizaj section underwent a renaming ceremony to honor Joseph R. "Beau" Biden, and is now known as the Joseph R. "Beau" Biden III roadway.

The road in recent years has been renumbered to N25.3. It its unknown when this change was made.
