= Drenoc =

Village in Kosovo

- Village
- Interactive map of Drenoc
- Country: Kosovo
- District: Pristina
- Municipality: Pristina

Population (2024)
  - Total: 568
- Time zone: UTC+1 (CET)
  - Summer (DST): UTC+2 (CEST)

Drenoc is a village in the municipality of Pristina, Kosovo.

== See also ==
- List of villages in Pristina
