= M-25.2 (Kosovo) =

Highway in Kosovo

M25.2 highway
- Albanian: Magjistrale 25.2; Serbian: Magistralni put 25.2; Serbian Cyrillic: Магистрални пут 25.2
- Rruga Prishtinë - Gjilan, N25.2

Route information
- Maintained by Ministria e Infrastruktures

Major junctions
- East end: M2 in Pristina (start)
- Pristina Gracanica Gjilan
- South east end: 42 in Serbia, Depce (end)

Location
- Districts: Prishtinaj, Gjilan

Highway system
- Roads in Kosovo

The M25.2 (Albanian: Nacionale 25.2, Serbian: Magistralni put 25.2) also commonly known as Rruga Prishtinë-Gjilan, and N25.2 is a road which connects the east and southeast of Kosovo. It starts from the border with the interchange with the M-2 and R6, passes through cities such as Pristina, Gracanica and Gjilan, and ends at the Kosovo-Serbia border. The road is 60 kilometers long.

== Route ==
The road starts from the south of Prishtina, at the R6 and M-2 interchange. The road continues as a 2x2 road until Hajvalia, where it becomes a 1x1 road. It passes through Gracanica and Gjilan, and ends at Mucibabe.

== History ==
The road in recent years has been unofficially renumbered to N-22.3, it its unknown when this happened.
