= Koliq =

Koliq Kolaj
- Village
- Location in Kosovo
- Country: Kosovo
- District: Pristina
- Municipality: Pristina

Population (2024)
  - Total: 209
- Time zone: UTC+1 (CET)
  - Summer (DST): UTC+2 (CEST)

Koliq (Albanian: Kolaj) is a village in the municipality of Pristina, Kosovo. It lies about 15 mi (24 km) northeast of Pristina. It is in the Gollak region, which with other villages make up the District of Pristina. It has a population of 209 people. As of today, more than 95% of the population have migrated to Pristina for a better economic life. The village is mainly in the mountains, though some parts are on flatlands.
