= Kolovicë =

Kolovicë: Kolovicë (Albanian); Којловица/Kojlovica (Serbian)
- Village
- Interactive map of Kolovicë
- Coordinates: 42.685242°N 21.196764°E
- Country: Kosovo
- District: Pristina
- Municipality: Pristina
- Elevation: 781 m (2,562 ft)

Population (2024)
  - Total: 3,411
- Time zone: UTC+1 (CET)
  - Summer (DST): UTC+2 (CEST)

Kolovicë (Albanian: Kolovicë, Serbian Cyrillic: Којловица/Kojlovica) is a village in Pristina municipality.
