= Jashanicë =

Jashanicë: Jashanicë (Albanian); Јошаница/Jošanica (Serbian)
- Village
- Interactive map of Jashanicë
- Coordinates: 42°40′00″N 20°38′50″E
- Country: Kosovo
- District: Pejë
- Municipality: Klinë

Population (2024)
  - Total: 1,145
- Time zone: UTC+1 (Central European Time)
  - Summer (DST): UTC+2 (CEST)

Jashanicë (Serbian: Јошаница/Jošanica, Albanian: Jashanicë) is a village in the Klina municipality, Kosovo.
