= Svirce (Leskovac) =

Svirce Свирце
- Village
- Location within Serbia
- Coordinates: 42°58′44″N 21°51′48″E
- Country: Serbia
- District: Jablanica District
- Municipality: Leskovac

Population (2002)
  - Total: 436
- Time zone: UTC+1 (CET)
  - Summer (DST): UTC+2 (CEST)

Svirce is a village in the municipality of Leskovac, Serbia. According to the 2002 census, the village has a population of 436 people.
