= Merdare =

Village in Kuršumlija, Toplica, Serbia

Merdare Мердаре (Serbian)
- Village
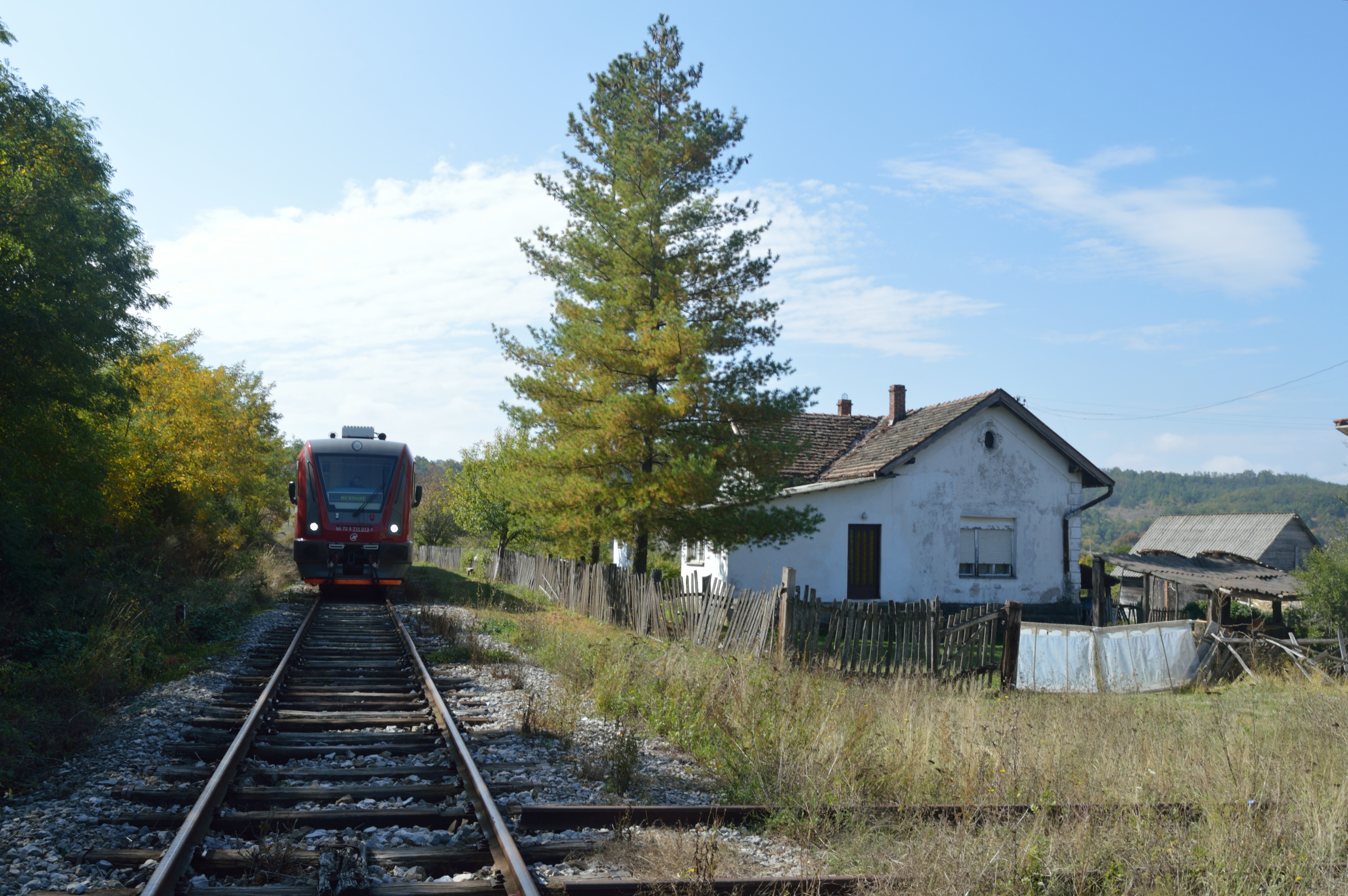
- Srbija Voz passenger train passing near Merdare

- Location within Serbia
- Coordinates: 42°56′N 21°14′E
- Country: Serbia
- District: Toplica District
- Municipality: Kuršumlija

Area
  - Total: 10.17 km^{2} (3.93 sq mi)
- Elevation: 650 m (2,130 ft)

Population (2011)
  - Total: 151
  - Density: 14.8/km^{2} (38.5/sq mi)
- Time zone: UTC+1 (CET)
  - Summer (DST): UTC+2 (CEST)

Merdare (Serbian Cyrillic: Мердаре) is a village located in the municipality of Kuršumlija, Serbia. According to the 2011 census, the village has a population of 151 people. A border crossing between Serbia and Kosovo is located in Merdare.

== Notable people ==
- Dragoljub Mićunović (1930–2026), Serbian politician and philosopher

== 2022-2023 North Kosovo crisis ==
During the 2022–present North Kosovo crisis barricades were formed near the Merdare border crossing, Due to the barricades, the government of Kosovo closed the Merdare border crossing on 28 December, but after an agreement with the Kosovo Serbs they agreed to start dismantling the barricades, the barricades were removed by 30 December and the border crossing was reopened.
