= Besi, Kosovo =

Village in Pristina, Kosovo

Besi
- Village
- Interactive map of Besi
- Country: Kosovo
- District: Pristina
- Municipality: Pristina

Population (2024)
  - Total: 695
- Time zone: UTC+1 (CET)
  - Summer (DST): UTC+2 (CEST)

Besi is a village in the municipality of Pristina, Kosovo.

== See also ==
- Pristina
- List of villages in Pristina
