= R 6 (Kosovo) =

Motorway in Kosovo

Arbën Xhaferi
- Albanian: Autostrada R 6 Serbian: Autoput R 6 Serbian Cyrillic: Аутопут 6
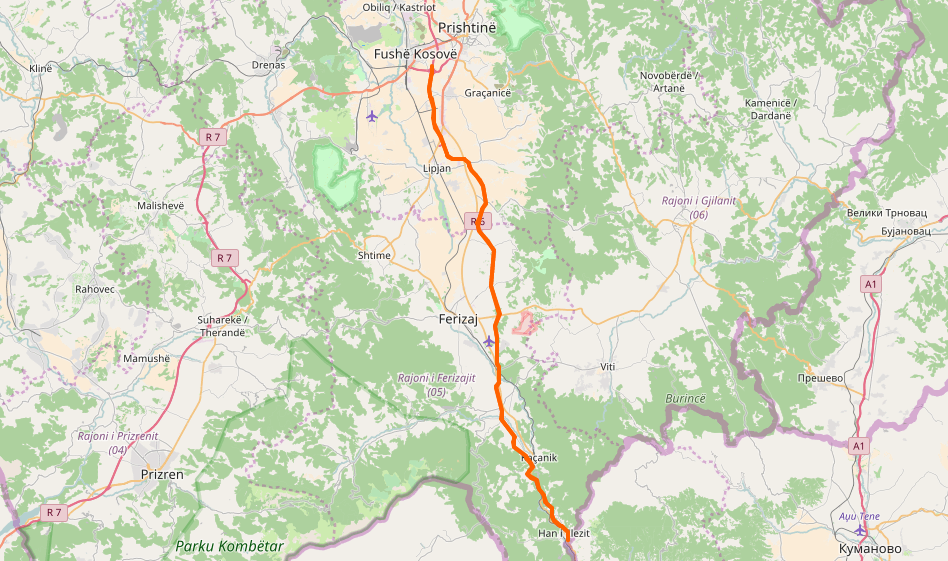

Route information
- Part of E65
- Maintained by Ministria e Infrastrukturës
- Length: 60 km (37 mi)

Major junctions
- North end: Pristina
- Lipjan; Ferizaj
- South end: Hani i Elezit

Location
- Districts: Pristina, Ferizaj
- Major cities: Ferizaj, Lipjan, Pristina

Highway system
- Roads in Kosovo

The R 6 Motorway (Albanian: Autostrada R 6; Serbian: Autoput R 6), also commonly Autostrada Prishtinë-Han i Elezit and Autostrada Prishtinë-Shkup or Autostrada Arbën Xhaferi, is a motorway in Kosovo running 60 kilometres (37 mi) in the districts of Ferizaj and Pristina. The motorway connects Pristina with Skopje in North Macedonia.

The motorway is named in honour of the Albanian politician and activist from North Macedonia, Arbën Xhaferi. Part of the Southeast European route 6 and European route 65, it consists of two traffic lanes and an emergency lane in each driving direction separated by a central reservation.

== History ==
Construction of the R 6 motorway started in July 2014. On 31 December 2016, the first 23 kilometers from Pristina to Babush i Muhaxherëve was opened for traffic. On 22 December 2017, a further 11 kilometers from Babush i Muhaxherëve to Ferizaj was opened for traffic. In June 2018, another section was opened for traffic from Ferizaj to Kaçanik. In May 2019, the last section of the motorway opened from Kaçanik to Hani i Elezit.

== See also ==
- Motorways in Kosovo
- Transport in Kosovo
- Economy of Kosovo
