= Zhur =

Village in Prizren Municipality, Kosovo

Zhur: Zhur (Albanian); Жур/Žur (Serbian)
- Village
- Interactive map of Zhur
- Location in Kosovo
- Coordinates: 42°10′1″N 20°36′47″E
- Country: Kosovo
- District: Prizren
- Municipality: Prizren

Population (2024)
  - Total: 3,624
- Time zone: UTC+1 (CET)
  - Summer (DST): UTC+2 (CEST)

Zhur (Albanian: Zhur or Zhuri, Serbian: Жур / Žur) is a village in the Prizren Municipality in southwestern Kosovo.

== History ==
Zhur is an Albanian toponym. The village Zhur was recorded in the Ottoman register of 1452 and had inhabitants with Albanian-Slavic names.

In 1912, during the Battle of Lumë, retreating Serbian soldiers were ambushed near the village by Albanian irregulars.

After the Kingdom of Serbia acquired Kosovo in the first Balkan War (1912), Serbia arranged a Military Administration named Žur. The municipality was part of the Srez (Serbian: Šar) of the Prizren District. This administrative subdivision lasted until January 6, 1929, after which the area was made part of the Vardar Banovina in the newly formed Yugoslavia.

== Geography ==
Zhur is located in southwestern Kosovo, five kilometers east of Morina in Albania, and eight kilometers west of Prizren. Neighbouring villages include Poslishta and Billusha to the east, as well as Shkoza to the west. The mountain landscape of the Koritnik starts south of the village.

The M-25 goes directly through the village, and the R7 passes north of the village.

=== Climate ===
Climate data for Zhur/Žur (1982-2012)
Month	Jan	Feb	Mar	Apr	May	Jun	Jul	Aug	Sep	Oct	Nov	Dec	Year
Mean daily maximum °C	3.4	6.4	11.6	16.4	21.8	25.5	27.9	28	24.1	17.3	9.9	4.9	16.5
Mean daily minimum °C	−2.8	−0.6	2.4	6.2	10.3	13.8	15.4	15.1	11.8	7.4	3.1	−0.8	6.8
Average rainfall mm	83	73	72	74	81	55	49	47	68	86	108	98	894
Mean daily maximum °F	38.1	43.5	52.9	61.5	71.2	77.9	82.2	82	75.4	63.1	49.8	40.8	61.7
Mean daily minimum °F	27.0	30.9	36.3	43.2	50.5	56.8	59.7	59.2	53.2	45.3	37.6	30.6	44.2
Average rainfall inches	3.3	2.9	2.8	2.9	3.2	2.2	1.9	1.9	2.7	3.4	4.3	3.9	35.2

== Population ==
Development:
Year	Population
1919	1,304
1948	1,926
1953	2,019
1961	2,348
1971	3,214
1981	4,353
1991	5,230
2011	8,927
2024	3,624

Zhur has a population of 3,624. Of these, 3,622 are Albanians and two Bosniaks. The Albanians of this village speak Albanian in the Gheg dialect.

=== Religion ===
3,624 are Muslim, one Catholic and one stated otherwise.

== Notable people ==
- Eshref Ademaj (1940–1994), Albanian mathematician and education activist
