= Gjurgjica =

Gjergjica Đurđica
- Village
- Location in Kosovo
- Coordinates: 42°33′31″N 20°48′45″E
- Location: Kosovo
- District: Pristina
- Municipality: Drenas
- Time zone: UTC+1 (CET)
  - Summer (DST): UTC+2 (CEST)

Gjurgjica (Serbian Cyrillic: Ђурђица), known as Gjergjica or Gjergjicë in Albanian, is a village in Drenas, central Kosovo. It is located in the geographical region of Drenica.

== See also ==
- Drenica
