= Arbën Xhaferi =

Albanian politician in Macedonia (1948–2012)

Representative at Macedonia Parliament
- In office 1990 – 15 August 2012
- Prime Minister: Nikola Kljusev; Branko Crvenkovski; Ljubčo Georgievski; Branko Crvenkovski; Radmila Šekerinska (Acting); Hari Kostov; Radmila Šekerinska (Acting); Vlado Bučkovski; Nikola Gruevski

Personal details
- Born: 24 January 1948 Tetovo, FPR Yugoslavia
- Died: 15 August 2012 (aged 64) Skopje, Macedonia
- Party: Democratic Party of Albanians
- Education: University of Belgrade
- Profession: Politician

Arbën Xhaferi (Macedonian: Арбен Џафери; 24 January 1948 – 15 August 2012) was a Macedonian politician of Albanian origin. Xhaferi was president of the Democratic Party of Albanians, an ethnic Albanian political party, and was an advocate of rights for ethnic Albanians in the country. He is best known for calling for a change in the Preamble of the Constitution.

== Life ==
Arbën Xhaferi was born in Tetovo, FPR Yugoslavia (now North Macedonia), on 24 January 1948 to a Kosovar family with Turkish connections, where he attended primary and secondary school. In 1968, he participated in student protests in the city after his uncle, a tailor, attempted to practice his right to fly an Albanian flag but an ethnic Macedonian forcibly removed it. He studied in Belgrade University's Faculty of Philosophy. Xhaferi spent most of his life in Pristina. He built a reputation as an art critic there and became a senior editor in Pristina television. Xhaferi was dismissed from the job when ethnic Albanians were sacked from the station by Slobodan Milošević's Serbian administration. He returned to Macedonia in the early 1990s. After a multi-party system was introduced in Macedonia, he became a member of the Party for Democratic Prosperity (PDP). Xhaferi focused on higher education and worked with Fadil Sulejmani to re-establish opportunities for Albanians. He sided with radical members of PDP to urge the party to take a more confrontational approach with the Social Democratic Union of Macedonia. PDP expelled him, along with Menduh Thaçi, in February 1994. He was elected to the Macedonian parliament in the elections in October 1994. From PDP came the Democratic Party of Albanians, led by him since its formation in 1997 until 2007, when he was replaced by Thaçi and became an honorary leader. Parkinson's disease prompted him to step down. He died on 15 August 2012, aged 64, at the Skopje Hospital, Macedonia, after being hospitalized due to a stroke. The R 6 Motorway in Kosovo is named after him.

== Personal life and views ==
Xhaferi's father was a tailor and he reportedly served jail time in the 1950s for protesting the expulsion of ethnic Turks. His best-known writings are "Challenges to Democracy in Multi-Ethnic States" (October 1998) and "The DPA Non-Paper" (April 2001), which are available on the Internet in English. In Xhaferi's view, the ethnic Albanians of Macedonia were relegated to a "second-class" status. He had also consistently demanded that Albanians be recognized as a constituent people in Macedonia, based on their numerical presence, which he estimated as well above the official figures from the 1991 census (boycotted by ethnic Albanians), 1994 census (conducted under international supervision) and the 2002 census. Xhaferi also wanted the rehabilitation of political prisoners from the Yugoslav period, which he estimated at over 50,000. He told international journalists that his parents were harassed by the Yugoslav police. For him, the Republic of Macedonia had failed to break with the Yugoslav state tradition of anti-Albanian bias.

Xhaferi supported Ljubčo Georgievski's proposal for the ethnic partition of Macedonia, which faced huge disapproval there. In 1998, he said: "The presumption that Albanians are a “minority” in the Balkans flies in the face of historical fact: Albanians are the third largest ethnic group in the region ... They are a majority that was divided by force." Xhaferi proposed that Kosovo should be renamed to Dardania and unite with Albania.
