= Svirce (Medveđa) =

Svirce Свирце (Serbian) Svircë (Albanian)
- Village
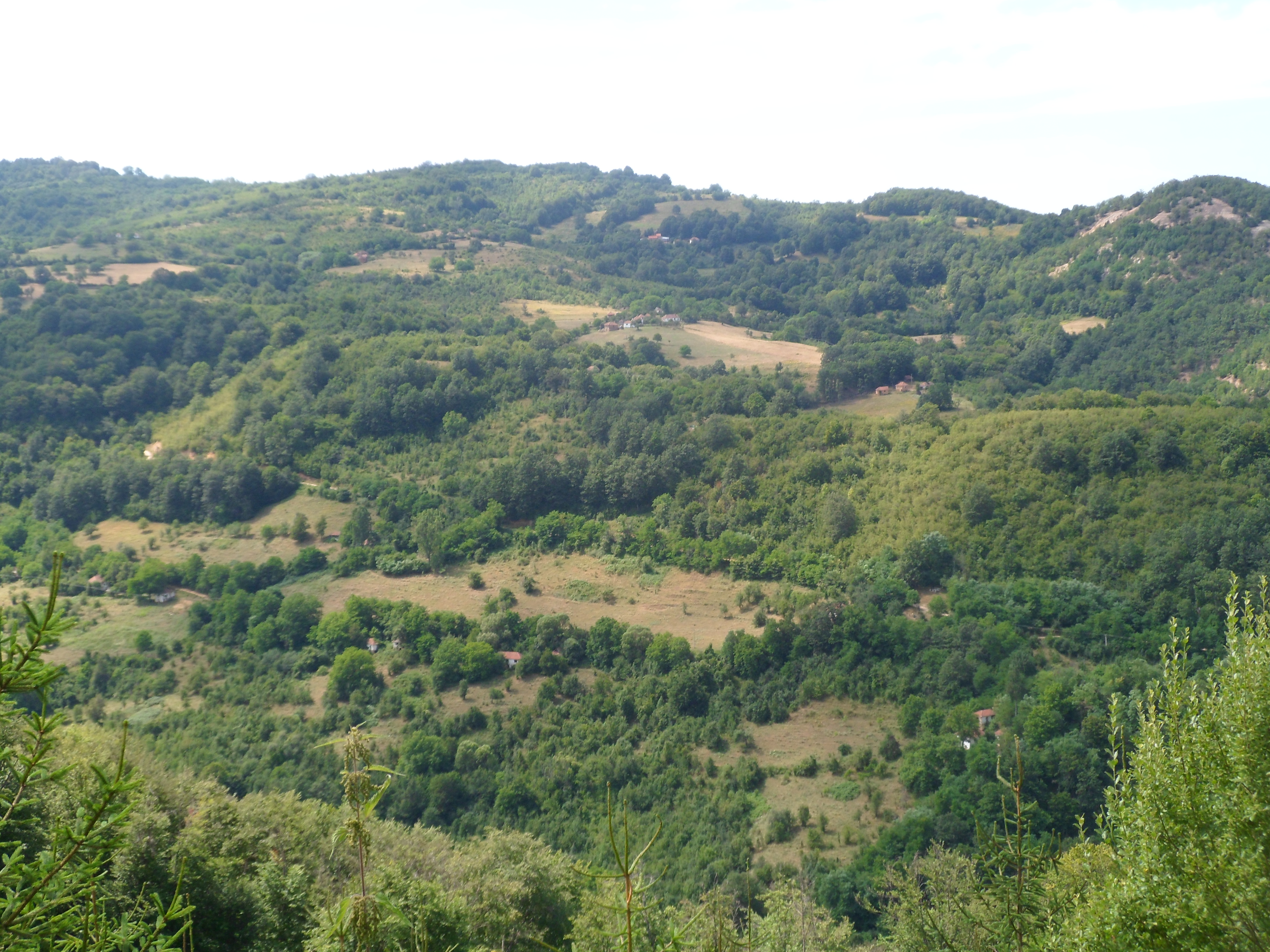
- Svirce, 2017 (vegetation covers abandoned homes since the 1999-2001 conflict)

- Location within Serbia
- Coordinates: 42°42′58″N 21°34′27″E
- Country: Serbia
- District: Jablanica District
- Municipality: Medveđa

Area
  - Total: 8.5 sq mi (21.9 km^{2})
- Elevation: 3,284 ft (1,001 m)

Population (2002)
  - Total: 501
- Time zone: UTC+1 (CET)
  - Summer (DST): UTC+2 (CEST)

Svirce (Serbian Cyrillic: Свирце; Albanian: Svircë) is a village in the south of municipality of Medveđa, Serbia. Until the 1999 Kosovo War it had 1300 people, the largest village in population in Medvedja municipality after the town of Medvedja itself. According to the 2002 census, the village has a population of 501 people. Of these, 499 were ethnic Albanians, and 2 others.

== See also ==
- geoSerbia, geographic portal of Serbia
- Yugoslavia
