= Vërmica =

Vërmicë: Vërmicë (Albanian); Врбница/Vrbnica (Serbian)
- Village
- Location in Kosovo
- Coordinates: 42°9′31″N 20°33′53″E
- Location: Kosovo
- District: Prizren
- Municipality: Prizren

Population (2024)
  - Total: 310
- Time zone: CET (UTC+01:00); CEST (UTC+2)

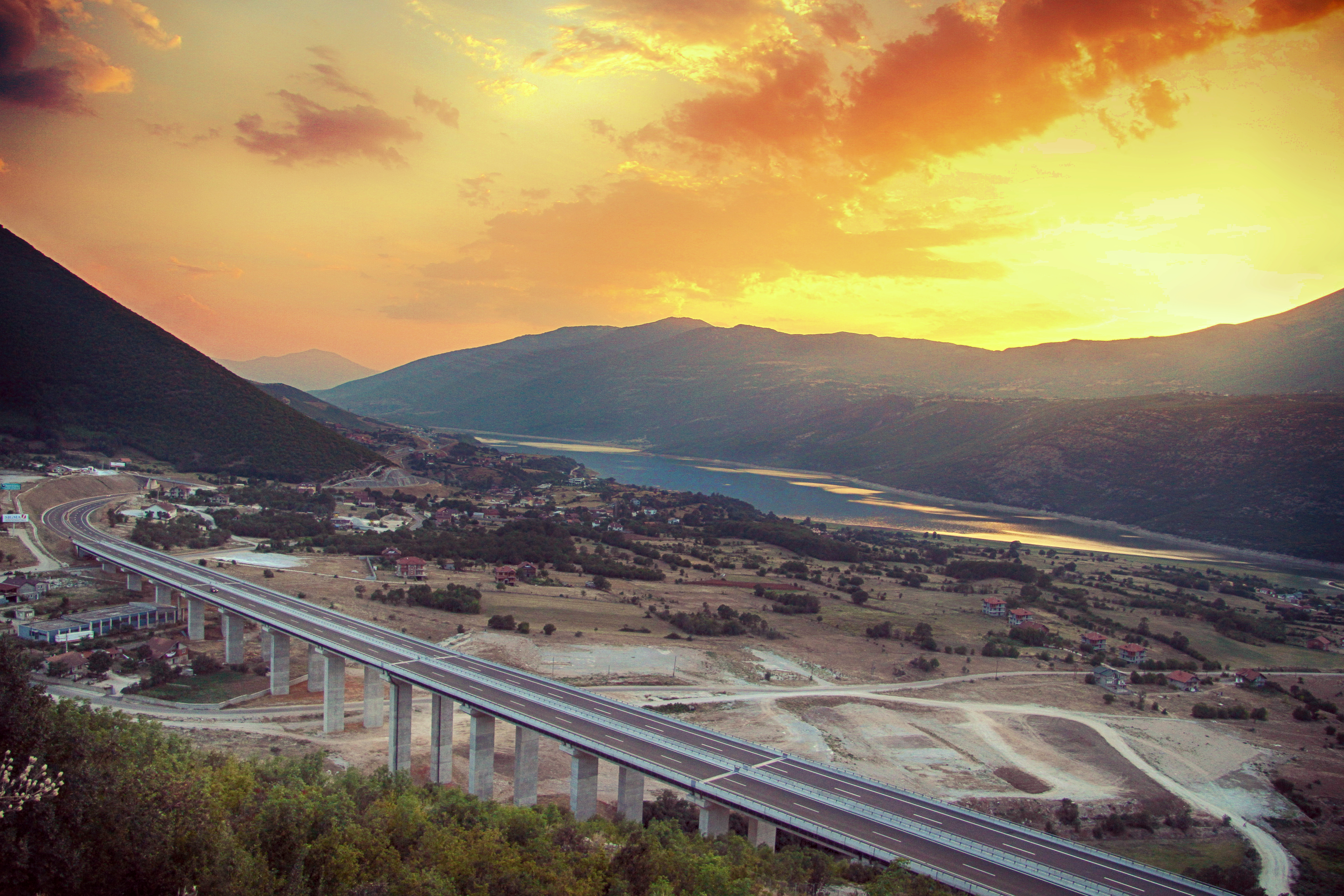
Highway between Kosovo and Albania

Vërmica (or Vërmicë, Serbian: Врбница/Vrbnica) is a village in the Prizren municipality of Kosovo. The village lies on the border with Albania.

== History ==
After Serbia acquired Kosovo in the Balkan Wars, the region was placed under martial law. The Vrbnica municipality was established during this period. It included the villages of Škoza (Albanian: Shkozë) and Dobrušta (Albanian: Dobrushtë). The municipality was part of the Šar srez and the Prizren district. This administrative subdivision lasted until 6 January 1929, after which the area was made part of the Vardar Banovina.

== Geography ==
Vërmica is located in southwestern Kosovo and borders Albania. The village lies at the White Drin between the Koritnik in the south and the Pashtrik in the north. The R7 and the M-25 passes through the Village. Neighbouring villages are Shkoza in the northeast and Morina in Albania southwest.

=== Climate ===
Climate data for Vërmica/Vrbnica (1982-2012)
Month	Jan	Feb	Mar	Apr	May	Jun	Jul	Aug	Sep	Oct	Nov	Dec	Year
Mean daily maximum °C	3.9	7.1	12.1	17.1	22.5	26.3	28.6	28.8	24.7	17.8	10.6	5.6	17.1
Mean daily minimum °C	−2.3	0	2.8	6.8	10.9	14.5	16.1	15.8	12.3	7.9	3.7	−0.3	7.4
Average rainfall mm	86	76	74	76	80	53	48	47	70	88	111	102	894
Mean daily maximum °F	39.0	44.8	53.8	62.8	72.5	79.3	83.5	83.8	76.5	64.0	51.1	42.1	62.8
Mean daily minimum °F	27.9	32	37.0	44.2	51.6	58.1	61.0	60.4	54.1	46.2	38.7	31.5	45.2
Average rainfall inches	3.4	3.0	2.9	3.0	3.1	2.1	1.9	1.9	2.8	3.5	4.4	4.0	35.2

== Population ==
Population of Vërmica
Year	Pop.
1919	350
1948	678
1953	709
1961	832
1971	1,168
1991	1,488
2011	661
2024	310

Vërmica has a population of 310. All of them are Albanians. The Albanians of this village speak Albanian in the Gheg dialect.

=== Religion ===
Of these 658 are Muslims. Three people preferred not to answer.
