= Hani i Elezit =

Hani i Elezit: Hani i Elezit (Albanian) Đeneral Janković or Ђенерал Јанковић (Serbian)
- Town and municipality
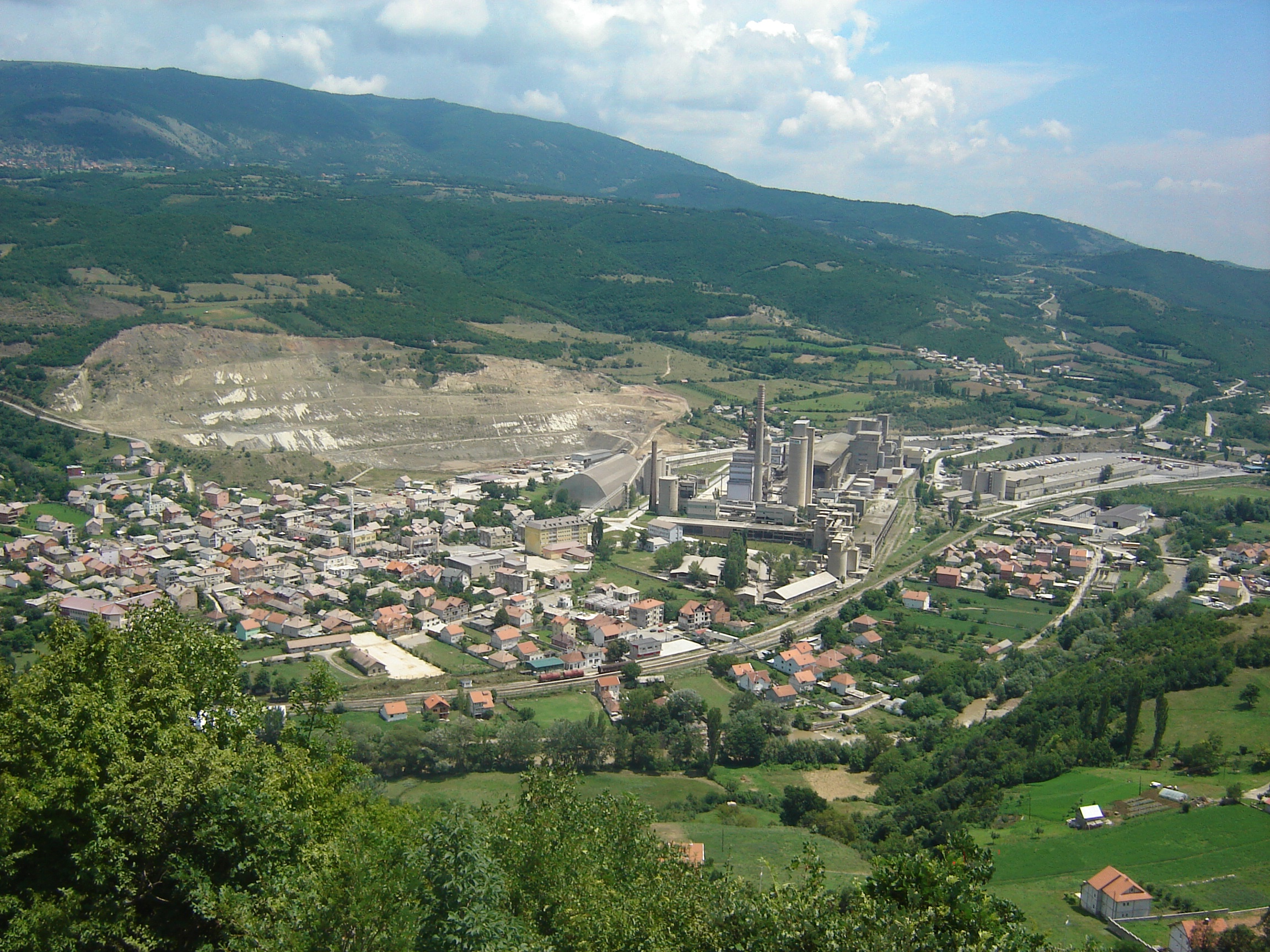

- Flag Emblem
- Interactive map of Hani i Elezit
- Location within Kosovo
- Coordinates: 42°08′51″N 21°17′57″E
- Country: Kosovo
- District: District of Ferizaj
- Municipality: 22 September 2005
- Named after: Han of Elez Dimca

Government
  - Mayor: Mehmet Ballazi (PDK)

Area
  - Municipality: 82.9 km^{2} (32.0 sq mi)
- Elevation: 516 m (1,693 ft)

Population (2024)
  - Municipality: 8,533
  - Density: 103/km^{2} (267/sq mi)
  - Urban: 2,555
  - Ethnicity: 99.81% Albanian; 0.19% Other
- Time zone: UTC+1 (CET)
  - Summer (DST): UTC+2 (CEST)
- Postal code: 71510
- Area code: (+383) 029
- Vehicle registration: 05
- Regional road: R311
- National road: N2
- Motorway: R6
- International E-road: E65
- Website: kk.rks-gov.net/hanielezit

Hani i Elezit or Elez Han (Albanian definite form: Hani i Elezit; Serbian: Ђенерал Јанковић / Đeneral Janković; officially Елез Хан, Elez Han) is a town and municipality located in the Ferizaj District of Kosovo. The municipality has a population of 8,533.

== History ==
The town has been inhabited since the 1500s. Its name in Ottoman times was İlyas-Han, which it got because of the Han of Elez Dimca. The town was renamed after Serbian general Božidar Janković in 1914 by a decision of the Serbian Council of Ministers.

It is one of the new formed municipalities formed in September 2005. It was previously part of the Kaçanik municipality. In 2012, the Kosovo Assembly approved the renaming of the town to Elez Han for its publications in Serbian and English; the name remains Hani i Elezit in Albanian.

== Geography ==
The town is located in the southeastern part of Kosovo, near the border with North Macedonia. The municipality covers an area of 82.9 km^{2} (32 sq mi). It borders Kaçanik municipality to the north and with North Macedonia, the municipalities of Jegunovce (west), Čučer-Sandevo (east), Saraj and Gjorče Petrov (south).

== Population ==
According to the 2024 census conducted by the Kosovo Agency of Statistics, the municipality of Hani i Elezit is home to 8,533 residents. The population is overwhelmingly homogeneous in terms of ethnicity, with 99.81% identifying as ethnic Albanians.

== Economy ==
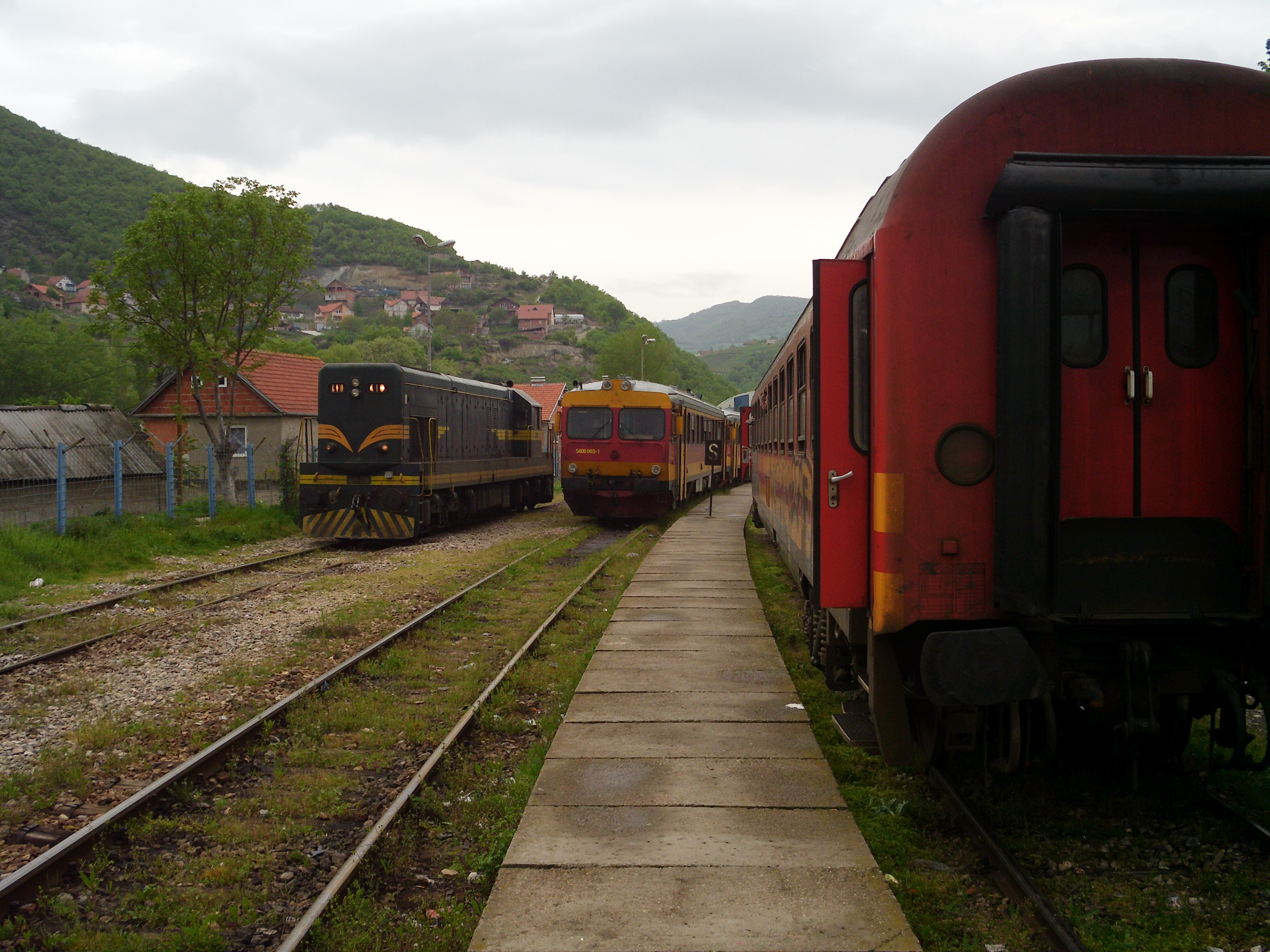
Hani i Elezit train station

The municipality has a total of 250 family shops and small businesses registered. The economy of Hani i Elezit is mainly based on three companies/enterprises: Sharr-Çimentorja (cement factory), Kosovaplast (plastic factory), and Salonit (roof covers factory). All the aforementioned were part of the Šar Combinate before 1989. Sharr-Çimentorja employs 770 people, Salonit employs 280 employees, and Kosovaplast has 100 employees.

Cafes, restaurants and retail trade are also vibrant. Private shops and other commercial businesses operating in the Pilot Municipal Unit are mostly family-operated enterprises, with approximately 200 employees. Nevertheless, a considerable part of population works in the agriculture sector or remains unemployed.

== Public Services ==
=== Health ===
There is one hospital providing primary health care. There are two doctors, one dentist, one lab technician and nine nurses. The hospital provides services until late afternoon, while emergency cases are treated by the hospital in Kaçanik due to the lack of staff in Hani i Elezit. The Municipal Unit is making efforts to hire two additional doctors to increase efficiency, but this process is very slow due to the lack of vacant positions in the staffing table.

=== Education ===
There are three primary schools (1,673 pupils) located in Hani i Elezit and the villages of Paljivodenica and Gorance. There is a secondary school located in Hani i Elezit with a total of 416 pupils.
