= Grebnik mine =

Bauxite mine in Kosovo

Gremnik
- Location: Klina, Peja, Kosovo
- Products: Bauxite
- Company: Boxitet e Kosovës

The Gremnik is one of the largest bauxite mines in Kosovo. The mine is located in Klina in District of Peja. The mine has reserves amounting to 3.66 million tonnes of ore grading 40.49% bauxite.
