= Industry in Kosovo =

Industrial production
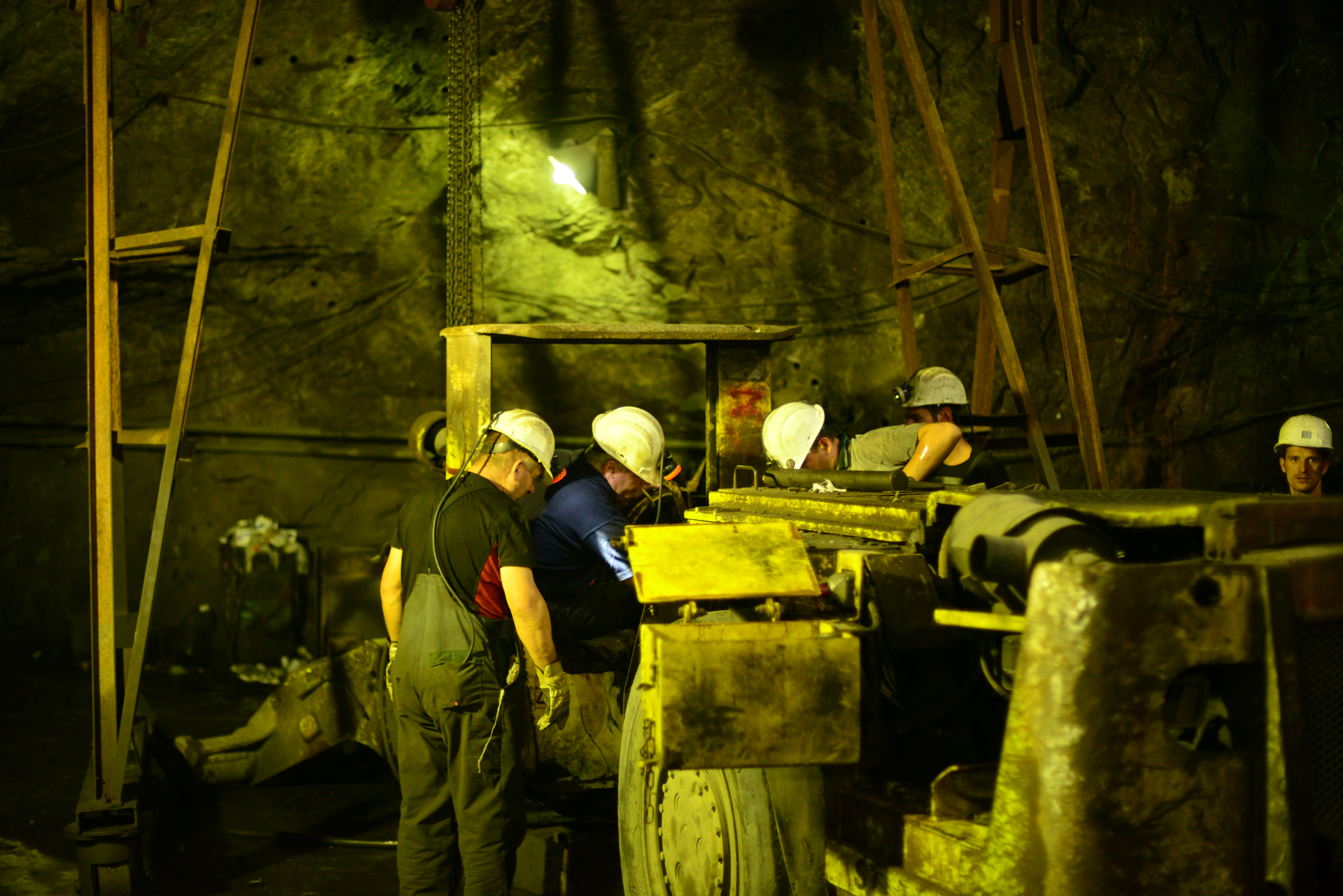
- The Trepca Mine
- Main industries: Mining, cement and construction, textiles, food and beverages, tourism, metallurgical industry.
- Industrial growth rate: NA%
- Labor force: 800,000 (2011). Country comparison to the world: 150
- GDP of sector: 22.6% of total GDP

Kosovo has a slowly developing plain industry. In 2009, the Industry accounted for 22.60 of GDP and a general workforce of 800,000 employees. It's on 150 th place, compared to the rest of the world. There are numerous reasons for this kind of stagnation, ranging from consecutive occupations, political turmoil and the recent Kosovo War (1999).

== Overview ==
Kosovo has several industry sectors, the most developed being ferrous and non-ferrous metallurgy and mining. In northern Kosovo, near the town of Mitrovica, sits a huge dilapidated industrial site known as the Trepca mining complex. During the 1980s, it employed 20,000 workers and accounted for 70 percent of all Yugoslavia's mineral wealth. One economist described Trepča as a "colossal conglomerate composed of more than forty mines, foundries, and subsidiary plants – which at its height generated 25% of the entire regional industrial production and figured among the principal exporters of the ex-Yugoslavia.' According to the same study, 'In the subsoil of Kosovo, one of the richest of Europe, enormous deposits are hidden of lignite, lead, zinc, non-ferric metals, gold, silver and petroleum," on top of 17 billion tons of coal.

As of 2019, the Ferronikeli mine and smelter operation was "the largest exporter in Kosovo, accounting for about 40% of the country's exports".

Other developed industry sectors in Kosovo are Energy, Textile and Food Industries, Tourism, etc.

Kosovo Energy Corporation J.S.C (KEK) is the sole power corporation in the Republic of Kosovo. KEK is vertically integrated and was legally incorporated in 2005. KEK was part of the Yugoslavia power system, and focused in production of energy from coal, with power supplied from plants outside of Kosovo. By the late 1990s, the core business of the Corporation became the production of coal and energy in Kosovo, through two open-cast coal mines - the Mirash mine and Bardh mine - and two power plants, PP Kosova A power station and PP Kosova B power station, which cover the territory of Kosovo. There are approximately 400,000 customers and 8,000 employees in different sectors.

There was no privatization of other sectors; hence most of them are dysfunctional.

== History of industry ==
=== Before Kosovo War (1999) ===
In 1455, Novo Brdo was completely destroyed by Turks who occupied it, when about 40,000 inhabitants were sent to Asia, as slaves.

The English bought concession in 1926, and the enterprise 'Trepca Mines Limited' existed under this name from 1927 until the end of the Second World War.

In the 1950s, the Kosovo's industry structure was poor. Non-ferrous metallurgy made the most effort and gave the most value to production and employed almost the half of employees in the mining industry. Construction materials made one eighth of it, as much as the coal, and half of it tobacco, wood and textile industry.

The industries which generated most of the revenues in 1987 were: electricity, production of machinery, ferrous metallurgy, textile, electrical appliances, metal works, food processing industry, footwear and wood Industry through 1980 reached considerable development level but in the 1990s it had stagnation in the development, manufacturing, employment and export. This stage and the war contributed to nearly complete collapse of Kosovo industry.

Before the period of economic decline and deindustrialization of Kosovo, a gasification and chemical industrial complex was managed in Obiliq, which turned local lignite into synthetic gas. The plant supplied the local population all the way to Skopje through an integrated pipeline. In addition to gas, it also produced phenol, ammonia water, and tar. Due to its decommissioning, the facility left behind severe chemical waste, which required environmental remediation.

Other production: In the period from 1965-1985, several factories for processing of metals were built, such as:

- Production of lead accumulators in Mitrovica and Peja,
- Processing of gold and silver in Prizren,
- Factory of zinc coated sheet in Vushtrri,
- Factory for production of nickel-cadmium batteries in Gjilan.

=== After Kosovo War (1999) ===
Kosovo was in very serious economic and social situation, i.e. it was in state of emergency. There was an immediate need for shelters, food, housing and refurbishment of houses and apartments. After the emergency phase, the commercialization process started in factories which failed to resume production in many factories (except few).

The privatization process started in 2003, but there were delays and it failed to function properly for many reasons.

== Mineral resources ==
Kosovo territory possesses significant lignite coal reserves of around 14 billion tonnes, small quantities of nuclear matter, resources geothermal energy level low and natural gas potential area. Kosovo has mineral resources deposits with the European level, it mainly has large reserves of silver, zinc, coal, lead, zinc, copper, iron, nickel and bauxite. That meets classification standards international trade (UNFC, JORC). In 2005 the Directorate for Mines and Minerals and the World Bank estimated that Kosovo had €13.5 Billion worth of minerals. However, Kosovo has a high density of population and buildings by South-Eastern European standards, and full exploitation of these resources at an acceptable environmental cost may not be easy.

Coal

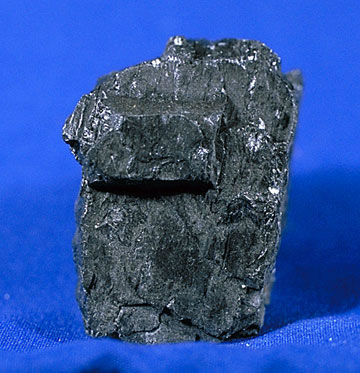
Coal

Coal (lignite) is the most important energy resource of Kosovo, which supplies about 97% of total electricity production. Estimated coal resources in throughout Kosovo are 12.5 billion tons, 8.6 billion tons of reserves are that economically exploitable considered profitable. The wealth of the mine in Sibofc [Sibovac] is estimated at 6.5 billion euros, wealth of Trepca at 3 billion, wealth of Ferronickel 2 billion, whereas the wealth of the resources in other parts of Kosovo were estimated at 2 billion euros.

At 14,700 Mt, Kosovo possesses the world's fifth-largest proven reserves of lignite. The lignite is distributed across the Kosovo, Dukagjin and Drenica Basins, although mining has so far been restricted to the Kosovo Basin. The first systematic records of lignite exploitation date from 1922, when small-scale, shallow underground room-and-pillar mining commenced in the Kosovo Basin. Large-scale winning of lignite began with the first production from the Mirash (1958) and Bardh (1969) open-pit mines, using bucket wheel excavators.

Bauxite

Bauxite carrying region is part of the Orahovac massif of ultramafic rocks. The origin and appearances stretching the bauxite Gremnikut Mountain, 5 to 10 km (6 mi) southeast of Kline. Bauxite of Kosovo belongs to the group of ferro-bauxite due to the high content of iron. Dynamics of bauxite reserves are about 2.7 Mt and reserves limestone reach accompanying figure of about 40 Mt17. The mine began operations in 1966. 1990 wide since 1966, 3255615 t bauxite were used. The largest annual production passed 200,000 tons/year.

Quartz

Industrial mineral quartz as high quality found in eastern Kosovo, central and south. Appearances and most popular fields found in: Strezoc, south of Binçës Bukovikut west and Debelde. Reserves of quartz in Strezoci are estimated to be in the area and Mt 2.53. Binça,3.1 Mt and Bukovikut (southeast of Kosovo) contains about 19 Mm ³.

Gold

In the Republic of Kosovo presented in paragjenezë gold with copper ore, lead and pure zinc (born) in the river alluvial deposits. Now extensive gold and silver are extracted only from the lead-zinc ores. Gold mineralization is associated with deposits of lead and zinc. In Mine Novo Brdo gold content is higher and this mine is known as the gas field higher composition of gold in Kosovo. Resources gold mine Artana estimated to be 2700 kg. According fields, evaluated the content of gold: Stanterg: 0.6 g/t, Bellobërdë: 0.7 g/t, Cernac: 1.0 g/t, Hajvali: 0.5 g / t, Kizhnica: 1.1 g/t, Badoc: 12:25 g/t, Artanë: 1.6 g/t, Crepulë: 12:13 g/t18.

Magnesite

Kosovo possesses two magnesite (MgCO_{3}) mines at Golesh and Strezovc. Both were originally worked as quarries and both moved to underground operations prior to their closure in 1999. Before 1990, the Golesh operation produced 110,000 t of magnesite, 22,000 t of sintered magnesia and 10,000 t of caustic calcite magnesia per annum. The Golesh mine is accessed via a shaft, where as Strezovc is accessed via a horizontal adit in the hillside.

Nickel

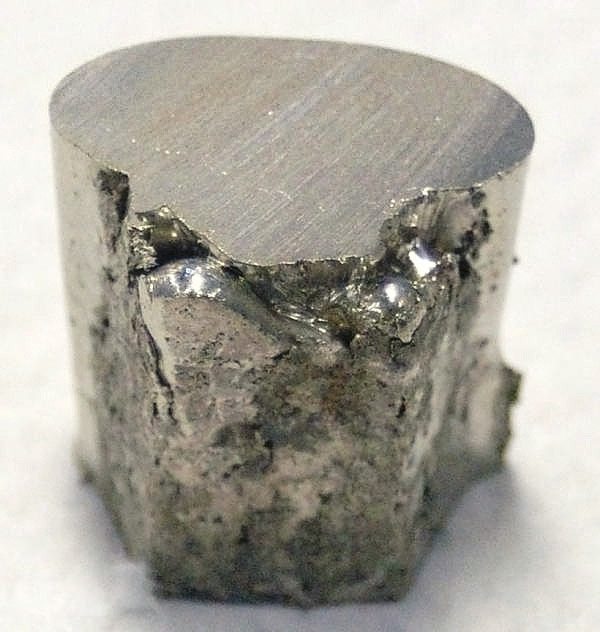
Nickel chunk

Former open-pit mining operations based on late rite were undertaken at Çikatova (Dushkaja and Suke) and Gllavica. Remaining mineable reserves have been calculated as 13.2 Mt averaging 1.42% nickel and 0.05% cobalt. Production stopped in 1999 and has yet to resume. The socially owned enterprise (SOE) 'Ferronikeli' mining complex has been put to international competitive tender for privatization.

Chromium

A chain of Alpine-type chromite pods in southwestern Kosovo are part of a series of linear deposits that continue into Albania. These pods are small but of high grade and in Albania are known to possess enhanced levels of platinum group metals (PGM). From the end of World War II until 1956, the ores were worked, primarily from the Gjakova mine by the Deva holding company, and direct-shipping ore was sent to Albania for treatment. When the high-grade ore was depleted, Kosovo began importing 30,000- 50,000 t/y of chromites ore from Albania. This ceased when the plant was closed in 1991. No meaningful exploration for chrome has been undertaken for several decades.

== Sectors ==
=== Trepca Mine ===
The production of refined metals in combine Trepca in characteristic years (period 1946-2001)
Metal	1946	1956	1975	1988	1995	2001
Lead (t)	23.007	63.216	89.138	83.445	12.186	700
Silver (kg)	7.317	83.145	111.396	95.491	19.051	5.700
Bismuth (kg)	17.141	111.150	55.243	22.272	0	0
Zinc (t)	0	0	28.808	48.550	5.118	0
Cadmium (kg)	0	0	73.200	156.400	11.000	0

The Trepca mining complex in Kosovo is a huge dilapidated industrial site near Mitrovice. For the first time in literature the name Trepca was specified in 1303 in some documents in archive of Dubrovnik.The first geological research started in 1924. The British, who built the plant in 1927 and supposedly secured a 50-year concession, terminated in 1941, are demanding compensation. In 1930, starts trial production of lead - zinc sulfide mineralization in this source. During World War II the Germans hold Trepca mine in working condition, but with a reduced level of production. From 1945 until 1990, the mine has been working non-stop, with an average production capacity of about 600,000 tons per year.

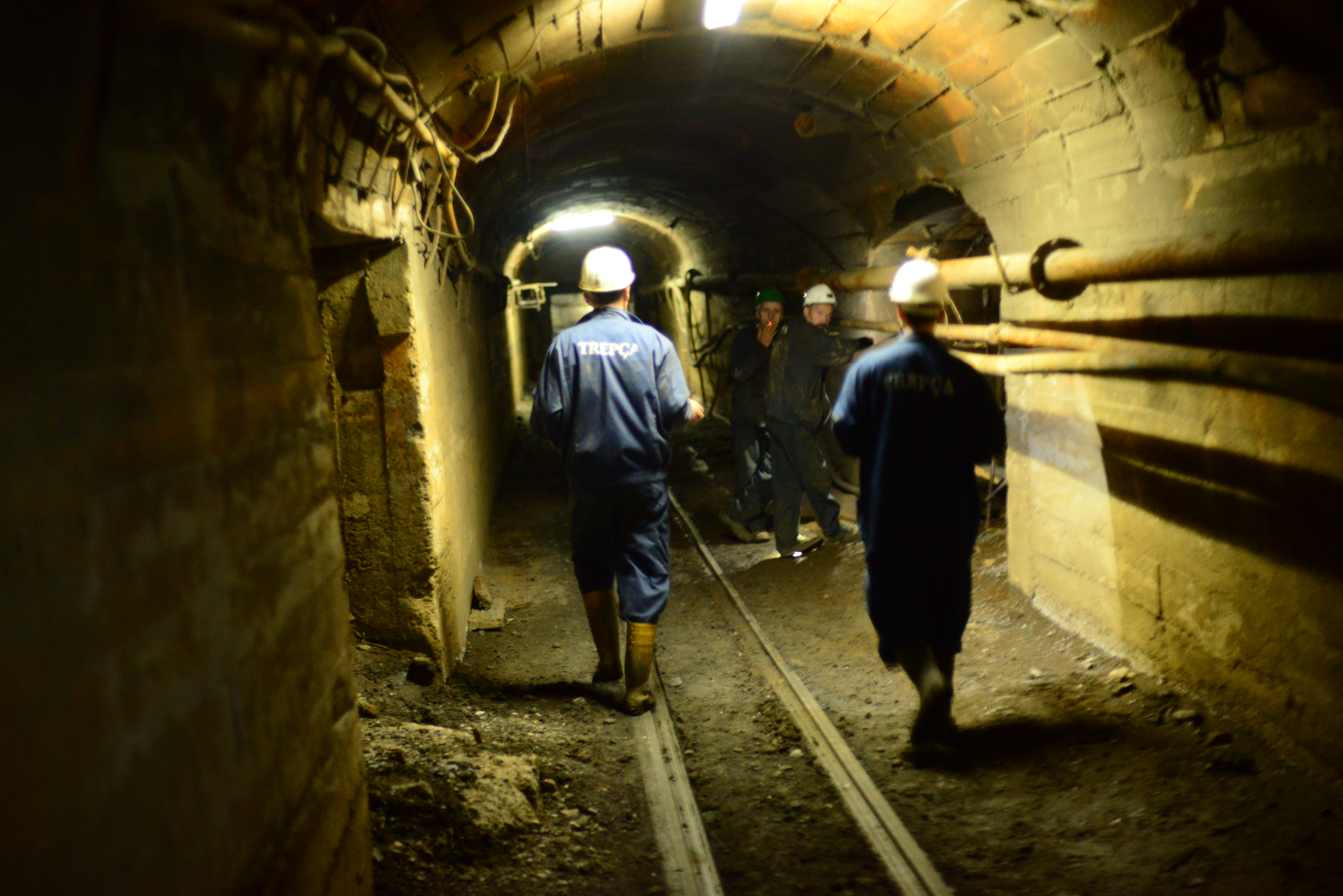
In the tunnels of the Trepca Mine

However, after the war, during the period 2000 - 2004, the mine has not produced, but has been researching and preparing for production workshops. So in 2005 the mine began producing Pb and Zn with minimum capacity.

The greatest success achieved by Trepca combine in 1983 was when Trepca exported goods worth of 103 million dollars, ranking the fifth in its own exporters in the former Yugoslavia. For 58 years of productive work, combine Trepca has produced 33 million tons of ore containing average 9% (Pb and Zn), or about 3 million tons of metal (Pb and Zn).

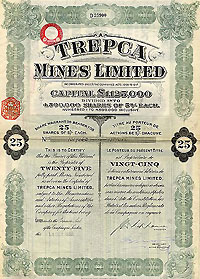
The contract formed between a British Selection Trust and the Trepça mines.

Trepca complex has 14.700 million tons of lignite reserves used for energy production in Kosovo, making Kosovo the fifth country in the world for lignite reserves. This mining complex comprises about 40 mines.

Mineral list contains entries from the region specified including sub-localities:

- Anglesite
- Ankerite
- Aragonite
- Arsenopyrite
- Baryte
- Bismuth
- Bismuthinite
- Bornite
- Boulangerite
- Bournonite
- Calcite
- Manganoan Calcite
- Cerussite
- Chalcanthite
- Chalcophanite
- Chalcopyrite
- Childrenite
- 'Chlorite Group'
- Coronadite
- Cosalite
- Covellite
- Crandallite
- Cubanite
- Dickite
- Diopside
- Dolomite
- Enargite
- Epidote
- Falkmanite
- Freibergite
- Galena
- 'Garnet'
- Gold
- Gypsum
- Hedenbergite
- Hematite
- Heteromorphite
- Ilvaite
- Indium
- Jamesonite
- 'Limonite'
- Löllingite
- Ludlamite
- Mackinawite
- Magnetite
- Marcasite
- Melanterite
- 'Melnikovite'
- Muscovite
- var: Illite
- 'Plumosite'
- Polybasite
- 'Psilomelane'
- Pyrargyrite
- Pyrite
- Pyrostilpnite
- Pyrrhotite
- Quartz
- var: Chalcedony
- Rhodochrosite
- Scheelite
- Siderite
- var: Oligonite
- Smithsonite
- Sphalerite
- Marmatite
- Stannite
- Stephanite
- Stibnite
- Struvite
- Tennantite
- Tetrahedrite
- Valleriite
- Vivianite
- Wollastonite

=== Energy industry ===
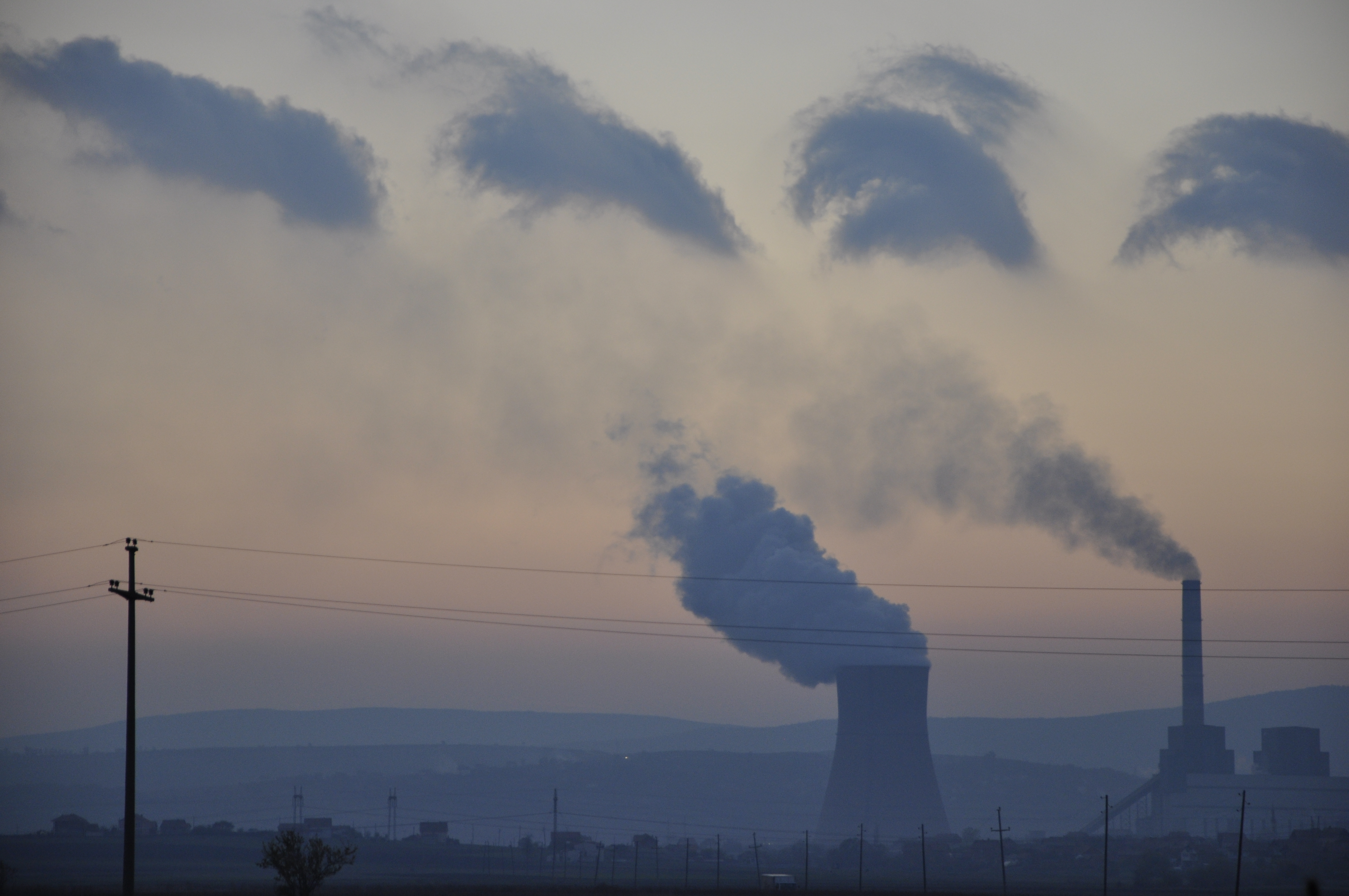
One of the two Kosovo power stations

Kosovo Energy Corporation J.S.C (KEK) is the sole power corporation in the Republic of Kosovo. KEK is vertically integrated and was legally incorporated in 2005. KEK was part of the Yugoslavia power system, and focused in production of energy from coal, with power supplied from plants outside of Kosovo. By the late 1990s, the core business of the Corporation became the production of coal and energy in Kosovo, through two open-cast coal mines - the Mirash mine and Bardh mine - and two power plants, PP Kosova A power station (880 MW, 40 year old) in poor condition and is the worst single-point source of pollution in Europe that was proposed to be shut down and PP Kosova B power station (700 MW, 27 year old) needs rehabilitation to meet EU environmental standards, which cover the territory of Kosovo. 98% of electricity generation in Kosovo comes from these two old, inefficient and highly polluting lignite-fired power plants. There are approximately 1,900,000 customers and 60,000 employees in different sectors.

Kosovo lignite reserves compared to the rest of the World (in billion tonnes)

=== Automotive components industry ===
Shock Absorber Factory Pristina and Ramiz Sadiku are the two best known flagships of automotive component industrialization in Kosovo, which produced primarily car seats and small vehicle parts, which produced shock absorbers for various well-known brands such as British Armstrong, German Susta as well as French Peugeot among others. Between 1989 and 1990 the Shock Absorber Factory employed over 1,500 workers and produced 3.3 million units each year.

=== Ferrous industry ===
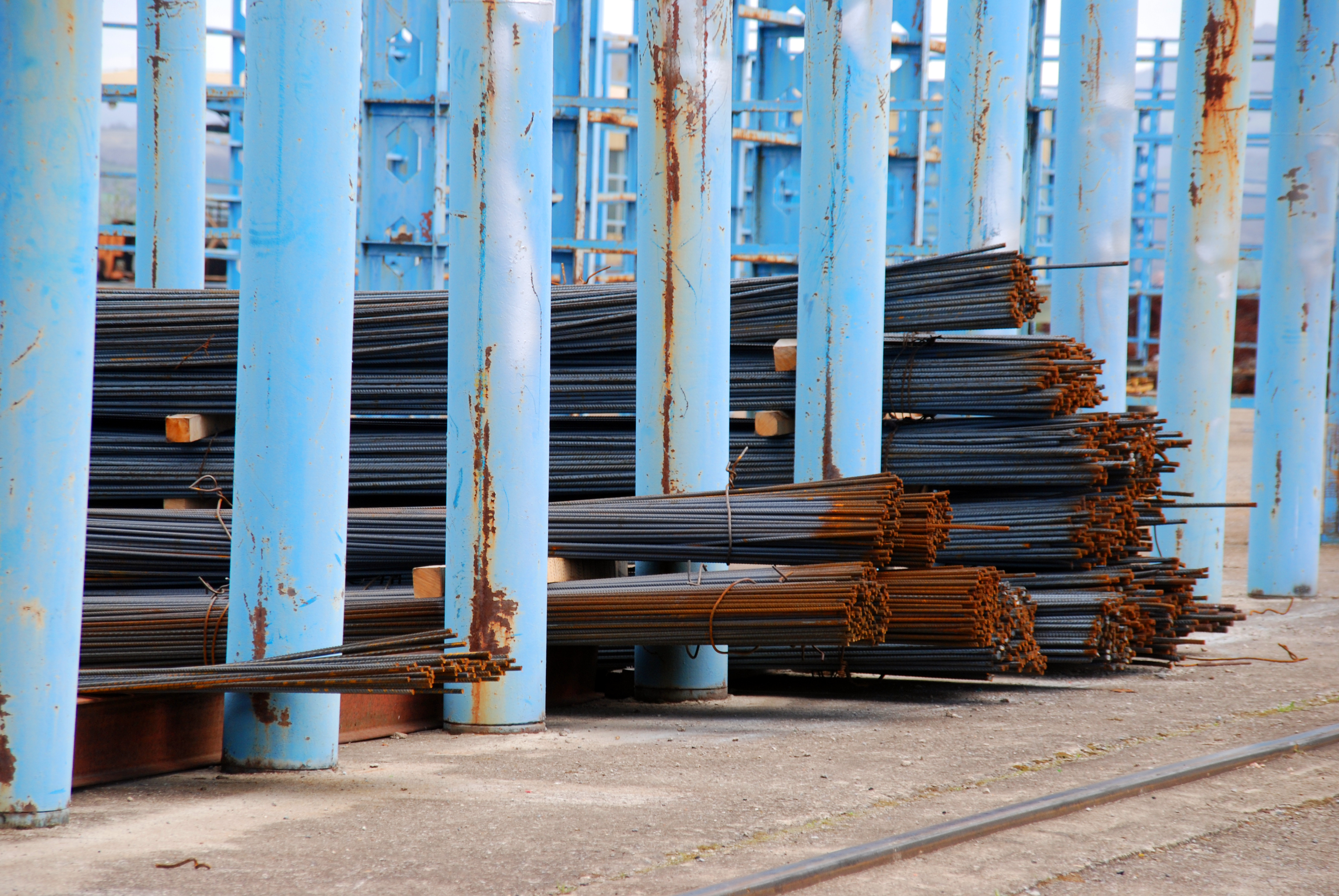
Steel factory - Podujevë

First industrial object was built in Peja (1968), 8,400 workers worked in this Industry (1987). In Prizren, Factory 'Famipa'- accessories for kitchen and sanitary fittings of gold and silver. In Gjakovë 'Metaliku', 'Metalac' in Janjevë, 'Vinex' in Viti and reinforcement steel factory in Podujevë. This industry produced metal packaging, stoves, and tin and steel constructions, aluminum utensils, etc.

=== Non-ferrous industry ===
Given that Kosovo was rich in non-ferrous metals (magnesium, marl, cement, kaolin for tiles, clay, quartz, gravel, etc.). The quicklime and slaked lime were produced in Kaçanik and the cement was produced in Hani i Elezit (240,000 tons per year). The bricks and tiles were produced in Pristina, Podujevë, Skenderaj, Peja and Gjakova, and this Industry employed more than 12,000 workers (2014).

=== Paper industry ===
Wood and paper industry were placed in some centres, where they produced planks, panel boards and plywood, parquet, doors, windows, chairs, tables, various furniture, paper, wrapping papers. City of Peja, as an area rich in forests has prompted the development of this industry and had the most famous Factory 'Wood Combine and Furniture Factory'. In Deçan (parquet factory); 'Radusha' (doors and windows factory) in Istog; Wallpaper and Furniture Factory in Pristina; 'Javor' – wood processing factory in Podujevë; paper and paperboard mill in Lipjan. This industry employed more than 8,000 workers.

=== Textile ===
The main companies operating in the Textile Industry, Clothing and Leather sector are:
JATEX	Gjakova
Unikat	Pristina
REMATEKS	Dragash
Semtex	Gjakova
KosovaTex	Pristina
Land Holding	Ferizaj

With over 200 years of tradition, textiles were the second largest industrial sector in Kosovo, after mining. In the past, products from Kosovar manufacturers targeted the local market, as well as other markets throughout the former Yugoslavia, Western and Eastern Europe and the United States. At its peak around 1990, each of the 15 SOEs engaged in textile production employed more than 1,000 people and sales totaled some 600 million Euro.

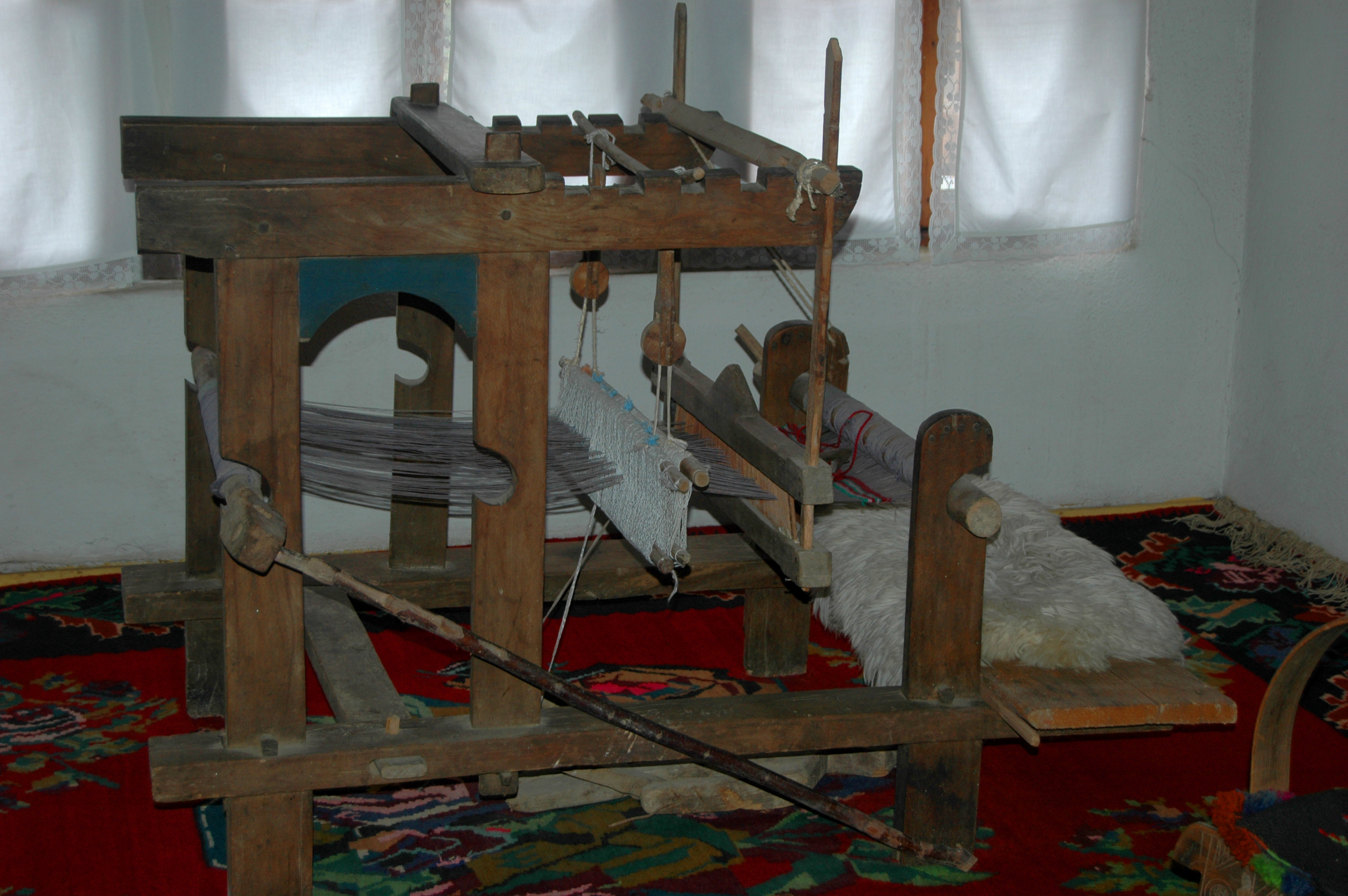
Old wooden loom

The most renowned centres of this industry were 'Kosova' in Pristina; 'Polet' in Vučitrn; 'Printex' and 'Sintelon' in Prizren; 'Emin Duraku' and 'Konfeksion' in Gjakovë; 'Integji' and 'Taftingi' in Gjilan. Production line consisted of, but not limited to: cotton, wool, synthetic fabrics, knitwear, apparel clothing, curtains, carpets, etc. Textile sector employed more than 14,000 workers and most of its products were exported abroad.

Recent developments in the region have frozen the primary trading links of the textile industry, causing lower production rates and resulting in a lack of competitiveness with foreign products. As a result, a major share of former SOE workers has become redundant. A minor part has, however, established private textile companies. Currently there are some 451 private companies engaged in textile production, out of which 90 percent are final product manufacturers. Although the textile industry has experienced a significant recovery during the past years, the majority of businesses are still small and take the form of micro enterprises. Consequently, they cater solely for the Kosovo market and are primarily geared towards a niche market.

=== Wine industry ===
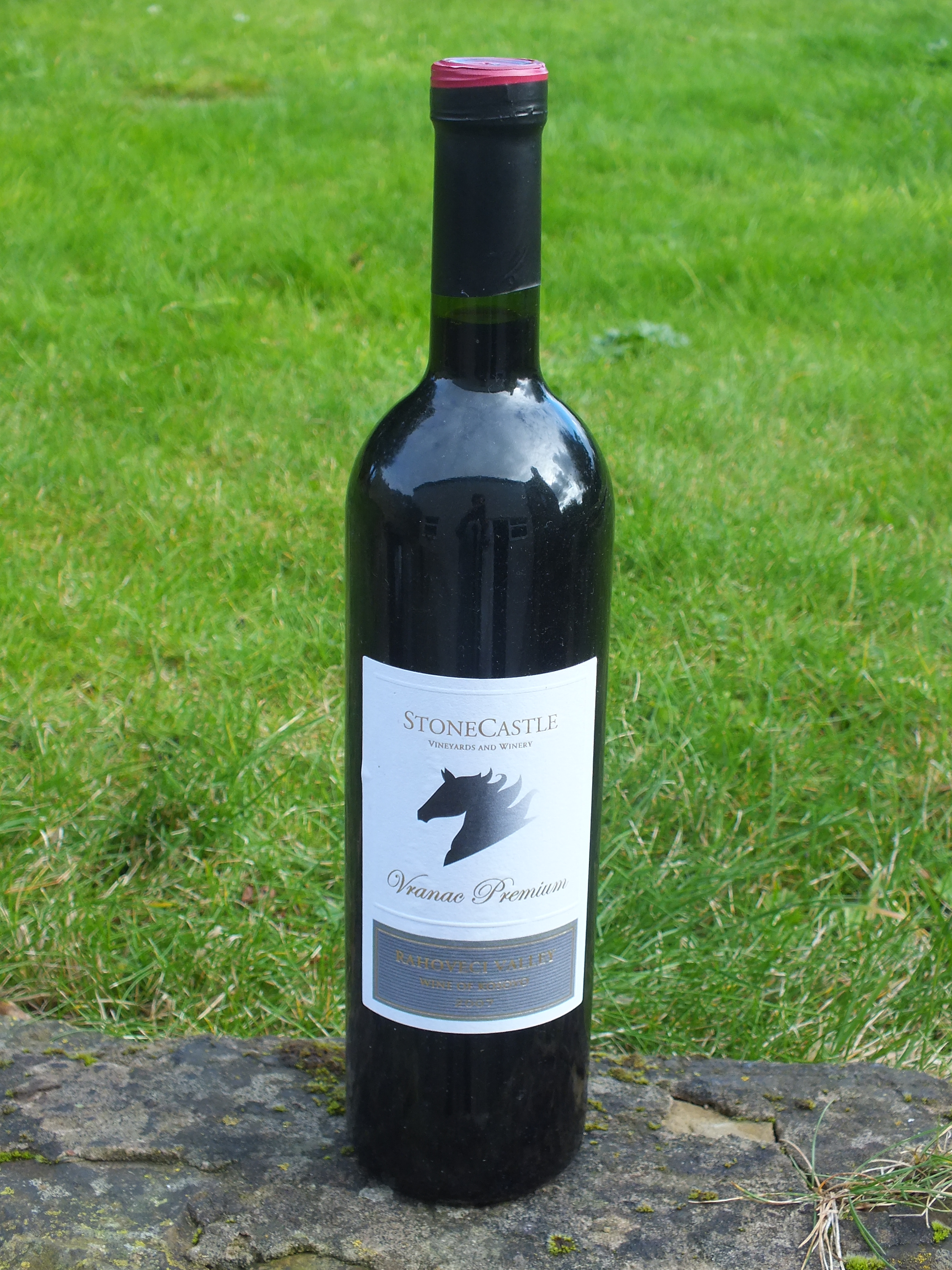
Kosovo wine

Grape-growing and wine culture has a long tradition in Kosovo. While local small-scale wine – production was introduced rampantly during the last twenty years, the wine industry in Kosovo became large-scale in the 1970s with the founding of the first larger SOEs. During its "glory days", the wine industry benefited from 9,000 ha vineyard area, divided into private and public ownership, and spread mainly throughout the south and west of Kosovo. The four state-owned wine production facilities were not as much "wineries" as they were "wine factories". Only the Rahovec facility that held app. 36 percent of the total vineyard area had the capacity of around 50 million liters annually. The major share of the wine production was intended for exports. At its peak in 1989, the exports from the Rahovec facility amounted to 40 million litres and were mainly distributed to the German market.

Enterprise	Processing capacities in million litres
NBI "Rahoveci" – Rahovec	50
NBI Suhareka – Suharekë	21
NBI Ereniku – Gjakova	28
Kosova Vine	13
Total	112

Vineyards and Wine

The art of grape growing and processing in Kosovo is similar to that of other Albanian and Balkans lands. Grape growing has an ancient history of more than 2000 years. The evidence for this is provided by historic data, various toponyms, proverbs, and many archaeological sites. Some of the most important archaeological pieces found include two slabs in the village of Reti, Municipality of Rahovec, with text inscriptions on grapevine, leaf, and cluster. Furthermore, a gravestone dating back in 2nd century AD found in the Helvetia Great Tekke in Rahovec, contains text in Latin and an engraved grapevine - a thousand years ancient evidence of grape growing. The Republic of Kosovo, with an area of 3.200 hectares of vineyards, is amongst the small winemaking countries of Europe. Vineyards are grown only in a limited number of municipalities. The grape and wine sector are of special economic importance to the municipalities where vineyards are grown. The biggest vineyard regions include Orahovac, Suva Reka, Prizren, Gjakova, Mališevo, and other municipalities with grape growing and wine making potential.

Current Status of Viticulture

Based on the vineyards registry, the Republic of Kosovo has 3200 hectares of vineyards. The entire viticulture sector is privately owned. Two big enterprises operational in Orahovac (Stone Castle) and Suva Reka (Agrokosova Holding) have been privatized by special spin off procedure, and currently have an active area of 850 hectares of vineyards, comprising 27% of the total area of active vineyards in Kosovo.

Grape Cultivars

Grape cultivars/varieties in Kosovo mainly (around 65%) belong to red grape. The most represented cultivars are: Vranac, Smederevkë, Prokupë of autochthonous origin (Balkans), and parts of cultivars mainly of French origin: Gamay, Pinot Noir, Merlot and Cabernet Sauvignon.

Climate Conditions

Kosovo has a mild continental climate, with Mediterranean influence affecting the Dukagjini Plain through the Drini i Bardhë Valley. Kosovo features cold winters and hot summers. The agro-climatic conditions are suitable for grape growing, in particular for early cultivars, whilst late ones may be problematic at the harvest time. Kosovo has 276 sunny days per year, thus helping grape to ripen and bringing Kosovo on equal par to some well-known wine making regions from this point of view. Grape is usually grown in steep hilly areas with good exposure to sun. The altitude in the areas where grape is grown in Kosovo ranges from 350 to 600 meters. The soil conditions are suitable for vineyard development, meaning that in many cases the soil is hardly used for other purposes. The geographical position of our country provides optimal Mediterranean climate conditions for grape growing with high production quantity and quality. The influence of the Drini i Bardhë Valley and the abundant rivers flow from East to West create a variety of climates and microclimates, making for a broad economic interest in growing vineyards. The plenty of light, the sufficient active temperatures, abundant precipitation in autumn, winter, and spring times that create sufficient water reserves beneath the soil, all contribute to the production of grape starting from mid July until mid October, with high consumption values.

==== Production of Raki ====
Country's dispersed grape-growers and mass-oriented producers are well-suited for the Raki production (distilled grape brandy ) While uneven viticulture techniques among small grape-growers can impact the quality of wines, the distillation process that creates Raki can mask variations in quality of the grapes and still create a product that is potent and drinkable.

=== Tourism ===
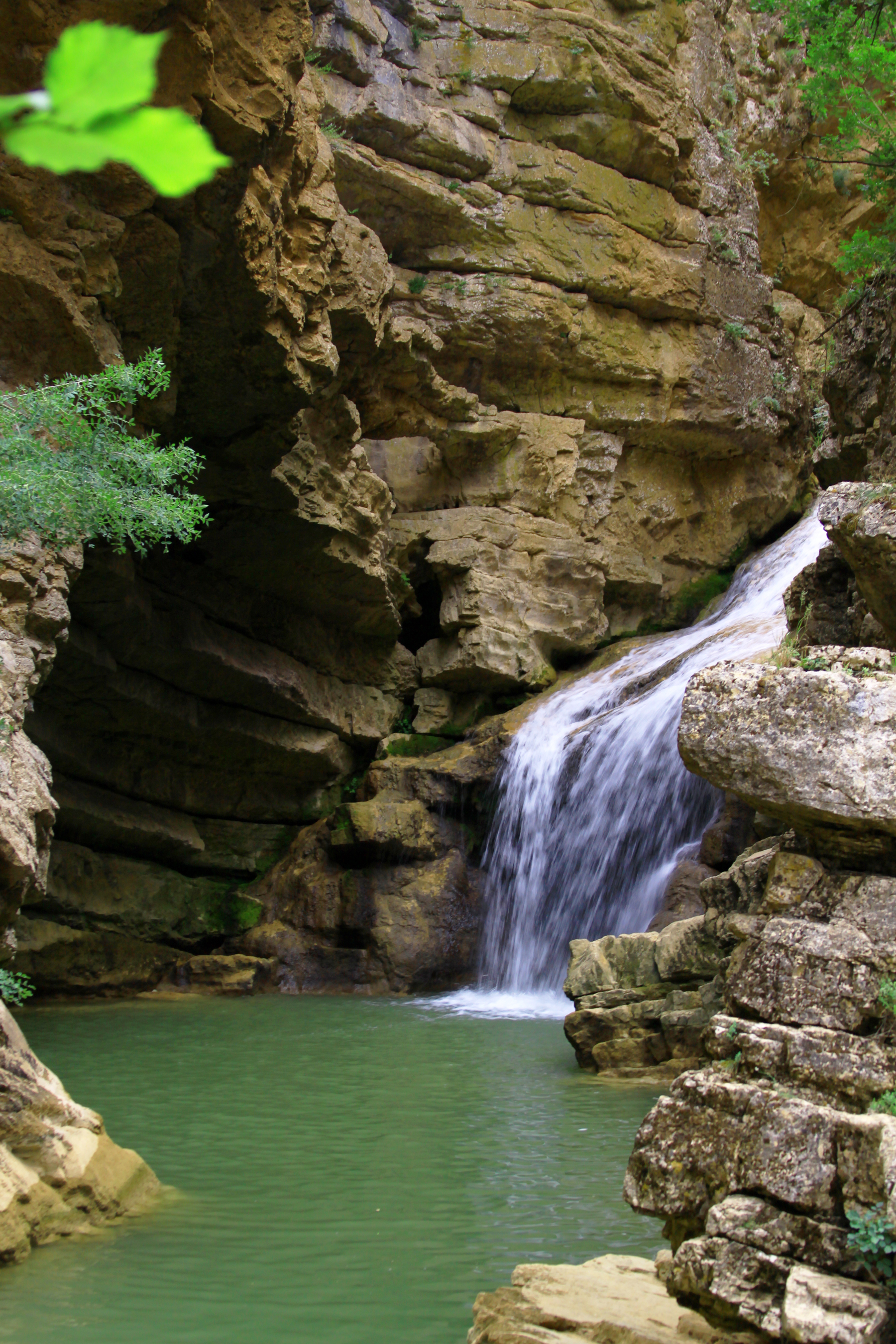
Mirusha waterfall

The natural values of Kosovo represent quality tourism resources. The description of Country's potential in tourism is closely related to the geographic position of Kosovo. Its position in south-eastern Europe, with a central position in the Balkan Peninsula, represents a crossroad which historically dates back to Illyrian and Roman times. The mountainous south of Kosovo has great potential for winter tourism. Skiing, one of the most interesting opportunities for foreign investors in this region is the skiing resort Brezovica in the Sharr Mountains. It offers perfect weather and snow conditions for ski seasons from November to May.

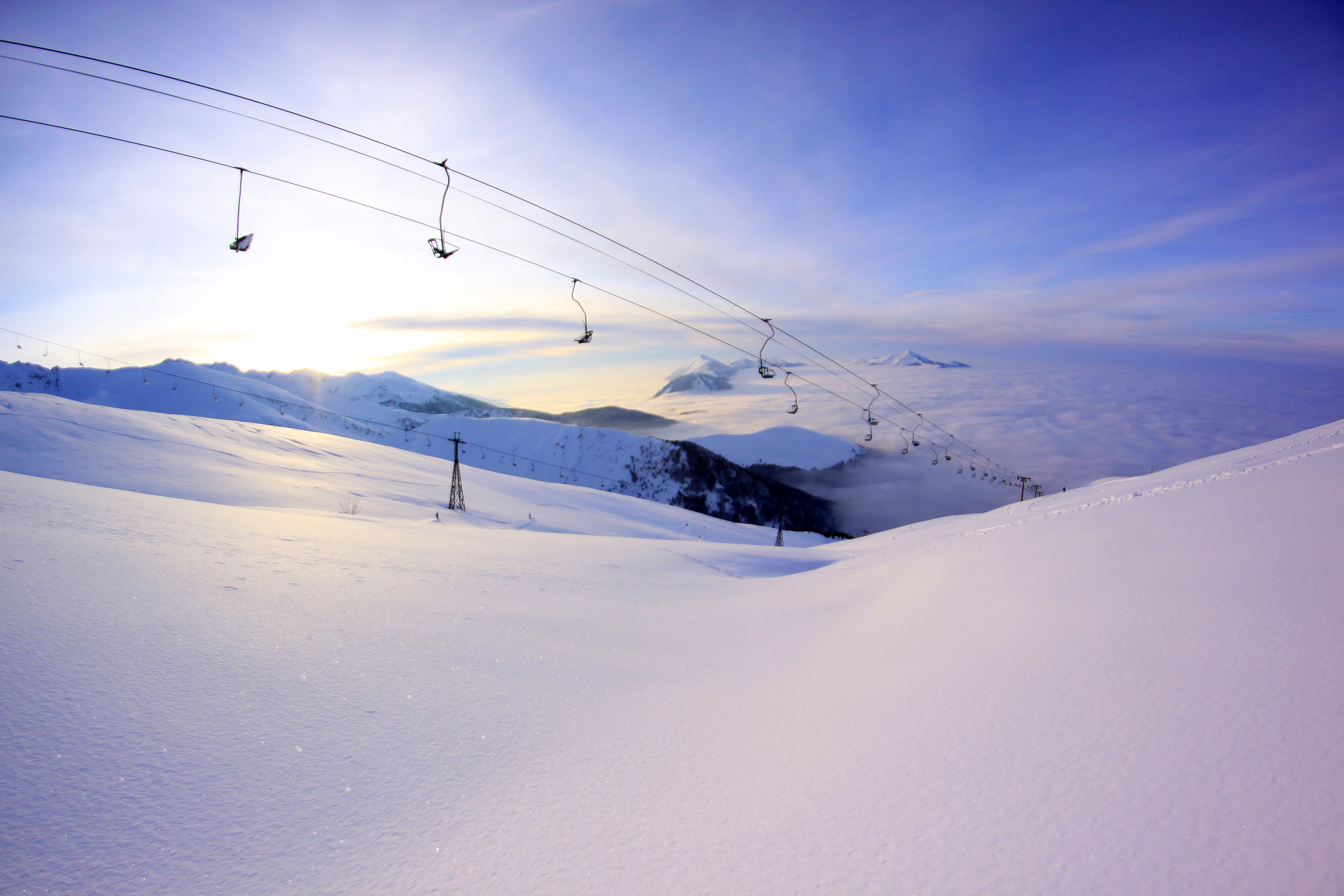
Brezovica ski centre

Brezovica has three hotels with 680 rooms, two restaurants and nine ski lifts with a capacity of 10,000 skiers per hour. It is about 60 km from Pristina Airport and 70km from Skopje airport.

The resort lies in the Shar Mountains, in the south of Kosovo near the borders with Macedonia and Albania. Kosovo has offered for privatization about 22,000 hectares of mountain land belonging to the socially owned enterprise "Sharrprodhimi", including land in the municipality of Dragash. The region is used for tourism activities such as skiing, eco-tourism, paragliding, mountain biking, rock climbing, trekking kayaking and horse riding. Kosovo's mountains, reservoirs and rivers are also used for hunting and fishing.

Also in the Šar Mountains in the southernmost part of the country bordering North Macedonia and Albania, Kosovo is offering for privatization about 22,000 hectares of largely untouched land in the mountainous area, belonging to the socially owned enterprise "Sharrprodhimi". The region offers tourism opportunities, such as skiing, eco-tourism, paragliding, mountain biking, rock climbing, trekking, kayaking, horse riding, etc. The Sharrprodhimi land in the municipality of Dragash has been identified as suitable for eco-tourism. Its sale is intended to be restricted to investors committed to a sustainable development programme with local support. In addition to the aforementioned tourism areas, Kosovo has numerous mountains, artificial lakes and rivers, which also provide opportunities for hunting and fishing.

== Defense Industry ==
Kosovo Government has announced the start of defense industry. Kosovo in coordination with its allies will start the production of state-of-the-art ammunition of NATO calibers, and design and production of military UAVs and UCAVs. The factories will be located in the municipality of Peja, in western Kosovo.

Some of the interested companies in this program are:

- Kosova Arsenal Group (KAG)
- Militrex Kosova Defense (MKD)
- Bliss Munitions Equipment (Bliss)
- Mechanical and Chemical Industry Corporation (MKE)

Name	Operations	Picture	Location
Kosova Arsenal Group (KAG)	Kosovo		Peja
Militrex Kosova Defense (MKD)	Kosovo		Vitomirice / Peja
Bliss Munitions Equipment (Bliss)	United States / Kosovo		Peja
Mechanical and Chemical Industry Corporation (MKE)	Turkey / Kosovo		Peja

== See also ==
- Economy of Kosovo
- Natural resources of Kosovo
- Trepca Mines
- History of Kosovo
- Tourism in Kosovo
