= Uqë =

Village in Komuna e Istogut, Peja

Uqë: Uçë (Albanian)
- Village
- Location within Kosovo
- Coordinates: 42°49′03″N 20°36′29″E
- Location: Kosovo
- District: Peja
- Municipality: Istog

Population (2024)
  - Total: 576
- Time zone: UTC+1 (CET)
  - Summer (DST): UTC+2 (CEST)

Uqë is a village in Komuna e Istogut, Peja, Kosovo. Uqë is situated near the villages of Zhakovë and Cërkolez - Crkolez. The village is also known as Uça.

== History ==
The village was mentioned in the Ottoman defters of 1485 with the name Oça (Uça).

It had 15 homes, and almost half of the inhabitants of Uça bore typical Albanian names such as: Ilia brother of Marin, Dimitri son of Gjon, Gjon brother of Andrija, Gjura son of Gjon, Bora son of Gjin, Bardo brother of Ilia, Gjon brother of Todor.
