= Brestovikë =

Village in Peja, Kosovo

- Village
- Coat of arms
- Interactive map of Brestovikë
- Location: Kosovo
- District: Peja
- Municipality: Peja

Area
  - Total: 8 km^{2} (3.1 sq mi)

Population (2024)
  - Total: 1,814
  - Density: 230/km^{2} (590/sq mi)
- Demonym: Brestovicas/e
- Time zone: UTC+1 (CET)
  - Summer (DST): UTC+2 (CEST)
- Postal code: 30090
- XK: +383 (04)
- Vehicle registration: 03

Brestovikë also known as Brestoviku, Nënkalaj or Gurinë is a village located on the outskirts of the city of Peja, Kosovo known for sports tournaments and suitable conditions for agriculture.

== Geography ==
Brestovikë is located on the northwestern outskirts of the city of Peja, Kosovo. It is in the territory of the Peja municipality. It borders the villages of Siga, Ornicë, Dushkajë, Vitomirica, Fierzë and Pelaj and is located near the mountains of Rugova and has a surface area of around 8 km^{2}. It is also known for a "poorer" hydrology then the rest of the region with neither the White Drin or the Peja Bistrica, the two main rivers in the area, not flowing through it. It has a low-terrain landscape with it being 0m above sea level.

=== Climate ===
Brestovikë has a Humid continental climate with no dry season and warm summer climate. The areas yearly temperature is 12.34 °C and it is typically -0.02% lower than Kosovo's average temperature. Brestovikë usually receives around 101.62 millimeters of precipitation and has 173.67 rainy days (47.58% of the time) annually. The warmest month is August with an average temperature of 29.44 °C and the coldest month is January with an average temperature of −5.54 °C. The highest temperature recorded was 37.46 °C during the months of July and August. The wettest month is November with 135.21mm and the driest month is September with 71.73mm.

== Demographics ==
As of 2024, Brestovikë had a population of 1,814 people, 1,359 were Albanians, 35 were Serbs, 109 Bosniaks, 1 Turk, 161 Roma, 18 Ashkalinj, 119 Egyptians, 4 Goranis as well as 7 others. The dominant language is Albanian and the dominant religion is Islam.

== Culture ==
=== Sports ===
The village is known for its sport fields, mainly in football and tennis.

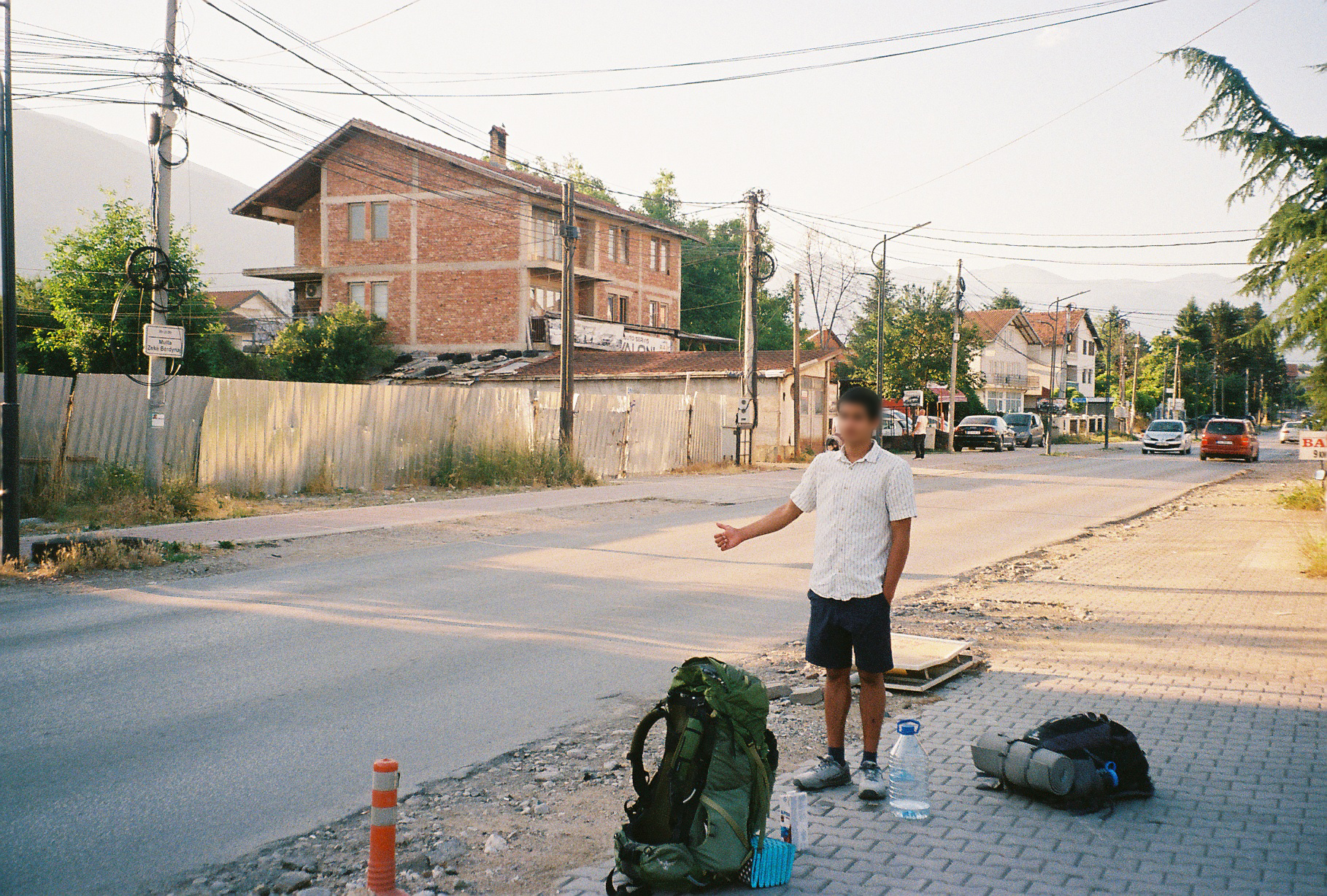
Hitchhiker attempting to leave Brestovikë.

The village houses the "Tahir Vokshi" football stadium of FC Besa which is also used by other local football clubs like KF Dardania.

It also houses the "Arben Zeka" tennis stadium which holds international tennis tournaments. During 2019 it hosted the U-16 tennis tournament and in 2023 it hosted the "ITF J30 PEJA OPEN 2023" tournament which was won by Alexandra Panagiotidou from Greece in the womans tournament and Teodor Davidov from the USA in the mens tournament.

== History ==
=== Brestovikë mass killings ===
On 13 October 1943, during World War II, armed Albanians killed 19 Serbian civilians in the village of Brestovikë. Again during September 1943, before the Italian capitulation, Albanians killed another 12 Serbian civilians.

== Economy ==
Due to its suitable conditions agriculture is the most popular and the most advanced occupation in the village, with farmers mainly keeping goats. Another widely spread occupation in Brestovikë is real estate, with villagers selling their land and houses in some cases to others. There is also a factory of the Gemix brand which produces school supplies and paint.
