= Nikola Đurić =

Serbian footballer (born 1989)

Personal information
- Date of birth: 6 November 1989 (age 37)
- Place of birth: Osojane, SFR Yugoslavia
- Height: 1.80 m (5 ft 11 in)
- Position: Right back

Team information
- Current team: Šušnjar

Senior career*
Years	Team	Apps	(Gls)
2006–2008	Obilić	22	(2)
2008–2011	BASK	73	(1)
2011	Novi Pazar	0	(0)
2012–2013	Čukarički	47	(2)
2013–2014	Ethnikos Gazoros	18	(0)
2014–2016	Rad	41	(0)
2016–2017	Flamurtari	1	(0)
2018	Proleter Novi Sad	3	(0)
2018	Dinamo Vranje	10	(0)
2019	Bačka Palanka	4	(0)
2019–2020	Buducnost Podgorica	10	(0)
2021–2022	Inđija	18	(0)
2022–2023	FAP Priboj		
2023-	Šušnjar		
- * Club domestic league appearances and goals as of 6 October 2022

Nikola Đurić (Serbian Cyrillic: Никола Ђурић; born 6 November 1989) is a Serbian footballer who plays as a defender.

He has played for Serbian clubs Obilić, BASK, Novi Pazar, and Čukarički and Greece Football League club Ethnikos Gazoros.
