= Dresnik =

Village in the municipality of Klina, Kosovo

Dresnik: Dresnik (Albanian); Дрсник/Drsnik (Serbian)
- Village
- Location in Kosovo
- Coordinates: 42°36′22″N 20°36′03″E
- Location: Kosovo
- District: Pejë
- Municipality: Klinë

Population (2024)
  - Total: 2,719
- Time zone: UTC+1 (CET)
  - Summer (DST): UTC+2 (CEST)
- Postal code: 32000
- Area code: +381
- Car plates: 03

Dresnik (Albanian: Dërsniku or Dresniku; Serbian Cyrillic: Дрсник) is a settlement in the Klina municipality of Kosovo.

== History ==
In the village of Dresnik lies the Archaeological Site of Dresnik. It is considered to be one of the most important archaeological sites not only in Kosovo, but also in the region, since it indicates the existence of civilization in Dresnik during the Roman Period.

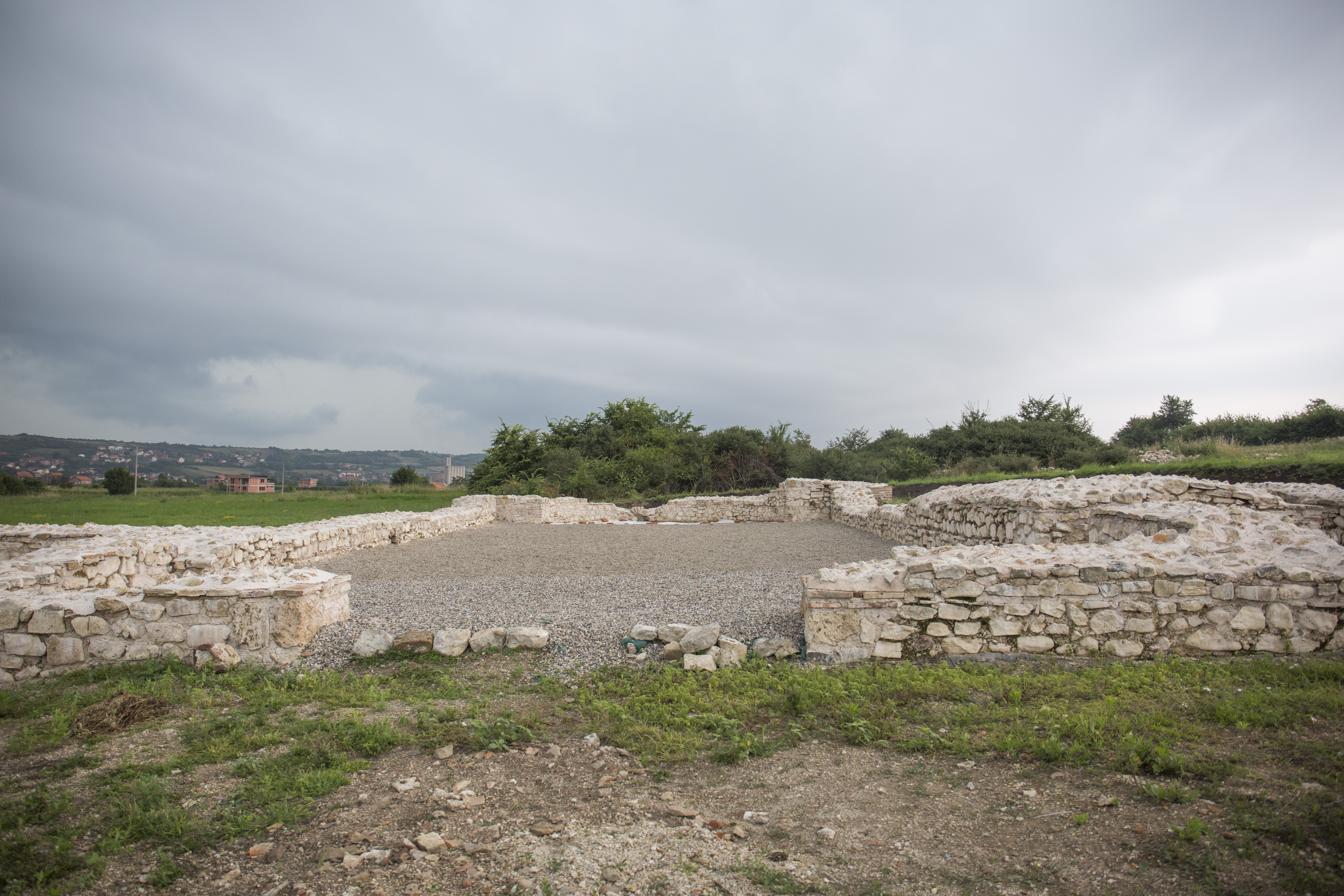
Dresnik archaeological site

During Early Middle Ages, Porphyrogenitus mentions the urban center of Desstinik.

During World War II, Dresnik was one of the settlements in Kosovo where the civilian population was persecuted by occupying fascist forces.

Archaeological discoveries from the Roman period were made here in August 2013.

== Population ==
In the 2011 census, the population was 1770.

Data for 1991 may not reflect the correct number of Albanians that year, as they largely boycotted that census.

Ethnic Composition
Year	Serbs	%	Albanians	%	others	%	Total
1961	900	78.13%	222	19.27%	30	2.60%	1152
1971	837	70.16%	337	28.25%	19	1.59%	1193
1981	709	71.91%	242	24.54%	35	3.55%	986
1991	590	95.78%	12	1.95%	14	2.27%	616
2011	10	0,56%	1751	98.9%	9	0.54%	1770
