= Religion in Peja District =

Overview of religion in Peja District, Kosovo

The District of Peja (Albanian: Pejë or Peja; Serbian: Пећ or Peć; Turkish: İpek) is one of the biggest districts located in the northern hemisphere of Kosovo. Istog and Klina are the two biggest cities after Peja belonging to this particular district. During the course of history, numerous religions dominated in the aforementioned district starting from Illyrian ‘polytheist religions’, to Catholicism to Islam. Despite the numerous ethnic frictions in the region, its diverse religious groups have practiced their faiths openly and have largely lived in harmony.

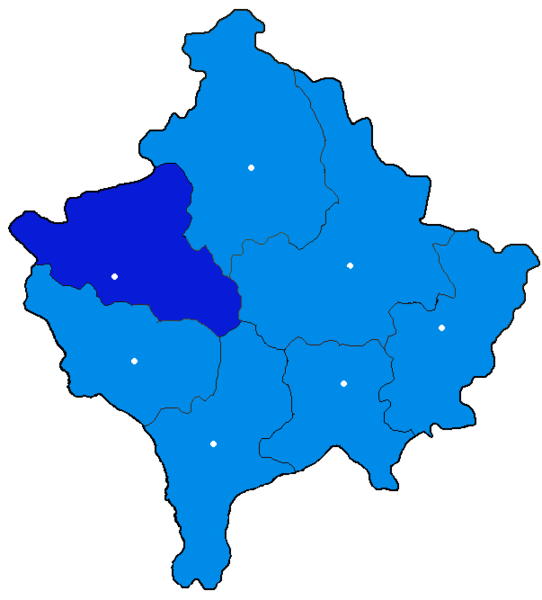
District of Peja

== Pre-history ==
The religious transition started when Romans came to the region of Peja, they brought new religious beliefs more precisely devotion on Roman gods of Pantheon. Most of the historians concentrated on the religious beliefs of Dradanians (more precisely of Peja region Dardanians), argue that the reason ancient Illyrians accepted to devote to Roman gods was that; “all epigraphic and other finds of Roman Dardania have been discovered in the peripheral parts of the region, in small settlements” While, Romans [Roman Municipium] settled in more frequently used roads and cities (by foreigners and natives). Dersniku (near Klina) was one of these major cities mentioned in the time of the Roman ruling in Peja District. The accessibility to the Roman culture consequently increased the influence of the new religion in the region. Afterwards the Albanian predecessors—the Illyrians—abandoned polytheism and embraced monotheistic religions, more specifically Christianity.

== History ==
In the 12th century, Stefan Nemanja (Serbian Prince) conquered the region of Peja and donated it to the newly found monastery of Žiča. Hence, the orthodox religion started to grow roots in the aforementioned region. Nonetheless, under the Serbian Emperor Stefan Dusan, Patriarch of Peć gained huge attention from orthodox population around Balkans, thus leading to the biggest rise of the aforesaid religion in this territory The dominance of orthodox and catholic religion in this region ended when Peja was conquered from Ottomans by the year 1455. In the 16th century Peja's religious demography was as followes: 14 Non-Muslim families, 33 Muslim families, and no Muslim families in the rural areas. It is quite normal that rural areas where not converted to Islam because of the power of 11 orthodox churches established. Historically, we can conclude that the influence of Ottomans was centered toward cities and not rural areas. Out of all the territories previously occupied by the Ottomans in the Balkans; Kosovo stands out as one of the only remaining Muslim dominated country. This can mainly be attributed to the de-islamization process that occurred after the fall of the Ottoman Empire. According to some historians and clerics, the de-islamization process in Kosovo never took place, mainly due to the fact that the main Albanian renaissance personalities did not even consider promoting such a process, since for them religious co-existence was a natural acceptable form of living.

== Art and archeology ==
The district of Peja, is very rich on art & archeology, counting numerous artifacts that date from the time of Illyrians. Distinctive sculptures and artifacts representing mythological gods such as Jupiter, Mercury, Hygiena are found in the regions. For the supreme Roman god, Jupiter, sculptures and holy stones are found nearly in every region of district of Peja; two of such epigraphic monuments are found in the city of Peja dating from the first century AD. Three other ones are found in the village of Pograxhe/Pograde, Dresnik, and Kline, and another one quite damaged was found in the village of Veriq/Verić (near Istog). One of the most important artifacts found in the district of Peja is “Judeo-Christian sculpture built in the defensive wall of Patriarch of Peć”; this six point star has a diameter of 16 cm and is composed of two intertwined triangles. More precisely, the six-point stare is located inside a rounded medallion, which very much resembles David's triangle, which can be found all over Jerusalem. People interested in this particular ancient monument can visit it in the Patriarch of Peć (in the road by Rugova mountains).

== Religious co-existence ==
The various tense religious occurrences in the past can mainly be attributed to the propaganda of some chauvinistic leaders. After the 14th century Serbian conquest of some vast regions inhabited by Albanians, the Serbian leader Stefan Dusan established Serbia's Patriarchal throne in the Peć monastery. Subsequently, a law that forced the conversion of Albanians to the national orthodox Serb religion was enacted. Despite such pressures, in the following centuries, the patriarch was respected and treasured by people of various ethnicities inhabiting the region, including Albanians. In the 1980s’ however, Milosevic propaganda exploited the power of the Orthodox Church to attain his aims, which resulted in violent encounters and raising tensions between the Serbs and Albanians of Peja. Nonetheless, notwithstanding this essential religious dissection along the ethnicity lines, The International Crisis Group have appraised that religion was not the main contributing factor of the Serbo-Albanian conflict. The conflict in Peja at times was followed with religious infrastructure damages. Undoubtedly, though, the tolerance and mutual understanding in the region was more than present. Muslim Albanians have protected Christian churches and even Serbian orthodox churches at various points of time in the 20th century. More specifically, 1913 and 1960 mark two years when Albanians received formal gratitude from the Serbian Orthodox Church for aiding in preserving the Peć Patriarchate. Despite the violent past decade conflicts, the Peć Patriarchate was not damaged. A Western-Europe research organization, founded and directed by Serbian ethnicity researchers, states that the preservation of Peć Patriarchate comes mainly due to the tolerance and respect toward all communities that the inhabitants of this community have.

== "House of Prayer" Protestant church ==
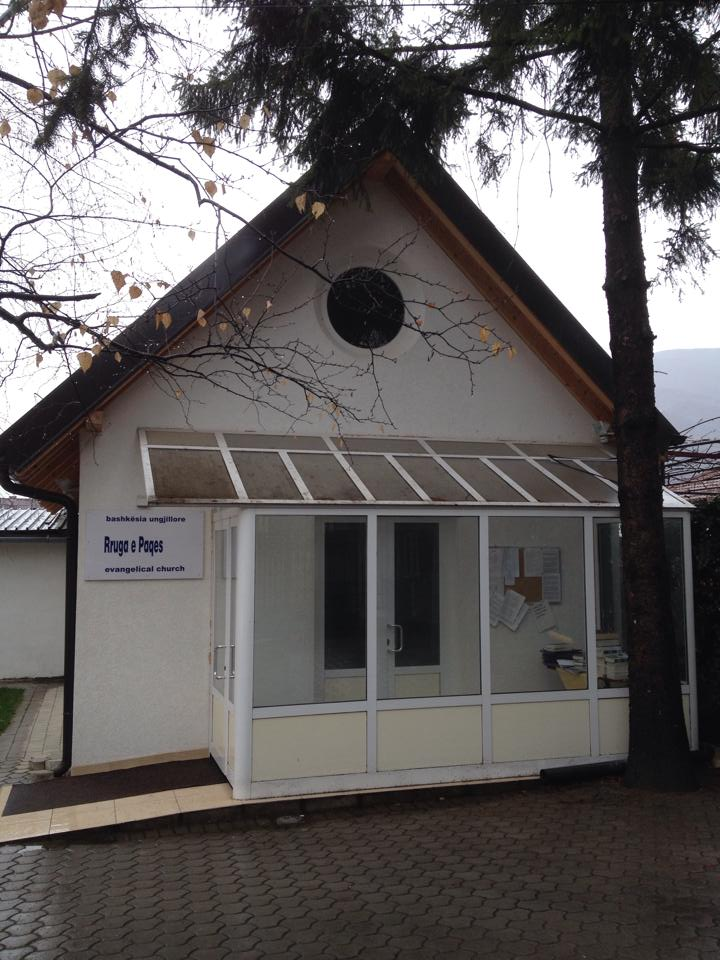
Protestant Church in Peja- Rruga e Paqes

In 1967 a Baptist Montenegrin preacher opened the "House of Prayer" Protestant church in Peja. The importance of this church lies in the fact this church, in comparison to other religious institutions, was followed and visited by people of various ethnicities (Albanians, Serbs, Bosnians and Montenegrins); additionally, the church also published books and other reading materials in both of the country's main languages, Serb and Albanian. Because of the 1999 war, the church was closed to be reopened a few years after. The church which is now called “The Path of Peace”, is led by Gani Smolica and is followed mostly by the Albanians and the RAE community (G.Smolica personal communications, 1 March 2014)

== Religious tolerance laws and rankings ==
The main religious conflict occurrences in the past can mainly be attributed to the propaganda of some nationalistic leaders. In comparison to numerous Balkan countries where inequalities and laws favoring certain religious groups were found, US government reports state that Kosovo is doing well in the freedom of religion aspects. The report more specifically pronounces that “The constitution and other laws and policies protect religious freedom and, in practice, the government generally respected religious freedom”. Additionally, The International Humanist and Ethical Union, an umbrella organization of roughly 120 member organizations from 38 countries, ranks Kosovo amid the highly tolerant western European countries. Despite the statistics that show varying numbers of Muslim and Catholic followers, the region has been known for its lack of religious “fanaticism”. In the last local election results in these three cities, the religiously themed parties never achieved to get more than 2 seats in the assembly.

== Religious demographics ==
Peja counts 20 mosques today; nonetheless, because of the 1999 conflict, more than half were renovated. Six ‘Serbian Orthodox Churches’ exist in municipality; with a non-functioning one located in Siga/Cige. Catholic religion counts 5 functioning churches. Whereas, Istog has 13 mosques, 6 Serbian orthodox churches (two are not in use), 1 catholic church in Gurrakoc/Durakovac.

Primary Religious Leaders in Istog
| Name | Religious Organization |
| Shemsedin Berisha, Muhamet Lipaj | Imams, Islamic Community |
| Don Lush | Catholic Priest, Catholic Church |
| Father Igmumar Sava | Serbian Orthodox Priest, Serbian Orthodox Church |

The municipality of Klina, has 7 mosques. From the aforementioned, three are renovated and four are newly built because of the 1999 conflict. Orthodox Religion in Klina counts 3 churches located in; Dollc/Dolac, Uljare/Uljarice and a monastery in Budisalc/Budisavci. The second most influential religion in the region of Klina is Catholicism with 6 churches located in Jagode/Jagoda, Zllakuqan/Zlakucane, Budisalc/Budiavci, Poterq i Ulet/Donji Petric and Doberdol/Dobridol. The statistical Agency of Kosovo reported a population of 96,450 in Peja, 39,289 in Istog, and 38,496 in Klina. Religious demography is presented as follows:

Peja
| Gender | Islamic | Catholic | Orthodox | No-Religion | Other | Total |
|---|---|---|---|---|---|---|
| Female | 46,505 | 1,282 | 186 | 28 | 48 | 48,544 |
| Male | 46,490 | 1,225 | 179 | 20 | 45 | 48,152 |
| Both Genders | 92,914 | 2,507 | 365 | 48 | 93 | 94,450 |

Istog/Istok
| Gender | Islamic | Catholic | Orthodox | No-Religion | Other | Total |
|---|---|---|---|---|---|---|
| Female | 18,811 | 335 | 91 | 20 | 8 | 19,327 |
| Male | 19,338 | 409 | 110 | 24 | 10 | 19,962 |
| Both Genders | 38,149 | 744 | 201 | 44 | 18 | 39,289 |

Kline/Klina
| Gender | Islamic | Catholic | Orthodox | No-Religion | Other | Total |
|---|---|---|---|---|---|---|
| Female | 15,678 | 3,536 | 50 | -- | 6 | 19,303 |
| Male | 15,507 | 3,588 | 50 | 1 | 7 | 19,193 |
| Both Genders | 31,185 | 7,124 | 100 | 01 | 13 | 38,496 |
