= Raushiq =

Raushiq: Raushiq (Albanian); Раушић/Raušić (Serbian)
- Village
- Interactive map of Raushiq
- Coordinates: 42.614806°N 20.312096°E
- Country: Kosovo
- District: Peja
- Municipality: Peja

Population (2024)
  - Total: 1,782
- Time zone: UTC+1 (CET)
  - Summer (DST): UTC+2 (CEST)

Raushiq (Albanian: Raushiq, Serbian: Raušić Раушић) is a village in the city of Peja, Kosovo.
