= Dresnik archaeological site =

Archaeological site in Kosovo

- Lokaliteti arkeologjik i Dresnikut (Albanian)
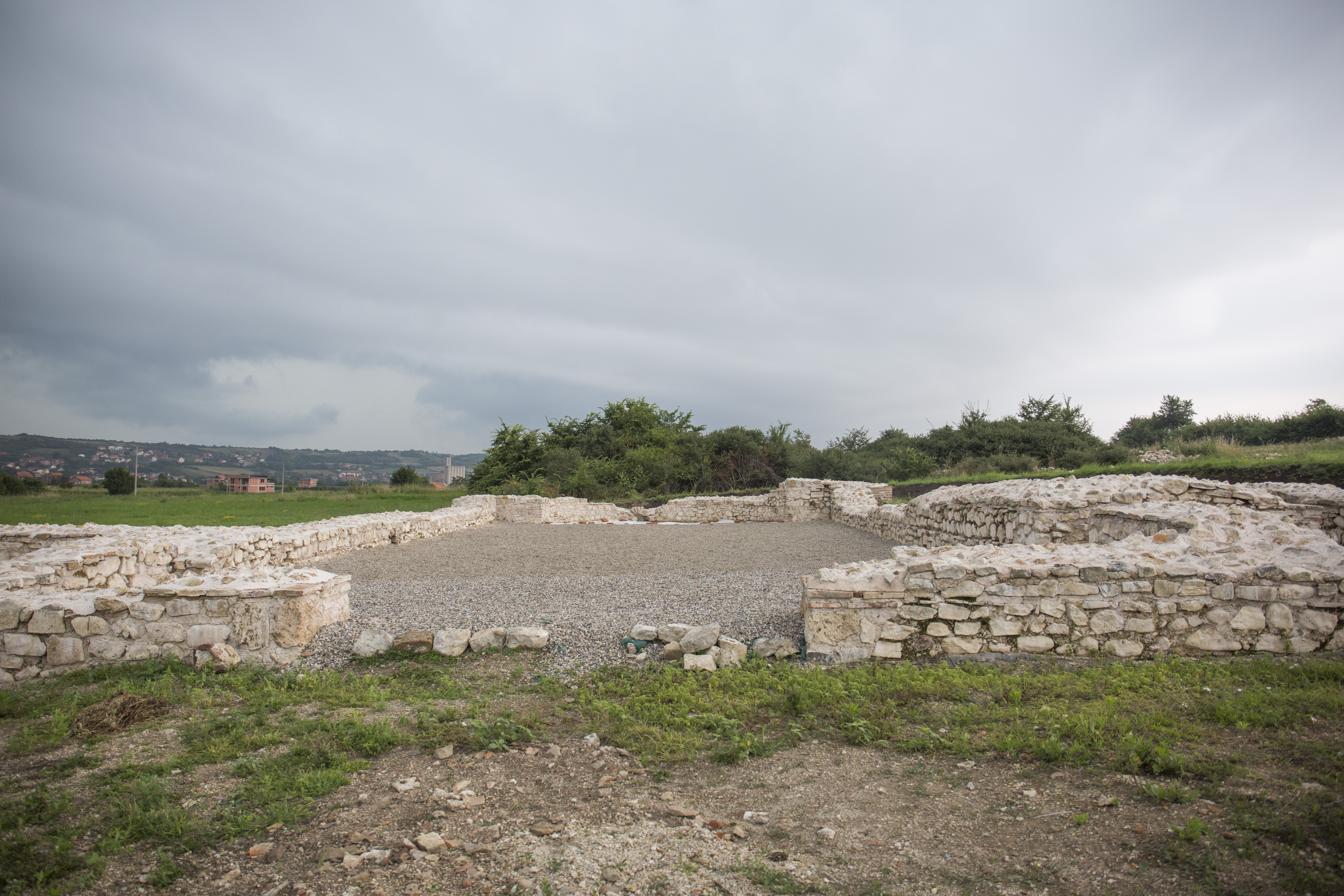

- Location within Kosovo
- 42°36′22″N 20°36′03″E
- Location: Dresnik, Klina, Kosovo

The Archaeological Site of Dresnik (Albanian: Lokaliteti arkeologjik i Dresnikut) is an archaeological site in the village of Dresnik, Klina, Kosovo. It is considered by to be one of the most important archaeological sites not only in Kosovo, but also in the region. A number of discoveries have confirmed the presence of relics, buildings and rare mosaics on the site, indicating the existence of civilization in Dresnik during the Roman Period. The archaeological site of Dresnik was first discovered in 2012 by lead archaeologist Masar Valla, working under the Archaeological Institute of Kosovo. It is reportedly unique in Kosovo, as the floor of every room of the building is covered by colourful mosaics.

== Geography ==
The village of Dresnik is located on the left side of the upper White Drin River valley, east of the town of Klina in the Dukagjini Plain (Central Dardania), in the western part of the Republic of Kosovo. The area known as "Lower Dresnik" is locally called "gradina" or "small fortress." The surrounding hills and fertile plains have historically supported agriculture, including grain cultivation, fruit farming, viticulture, and livestock.

== History ==
Early scholars such as Arthur Evans, Emil Čershkov, and Zef Mirdita all supported the view that Dresnik was a Roman municipium, based on epigraphic evidence.

Following the Roman conquest of Dardania, the area became part of the province of Moesia around 2–6 CE. Under Emperor Domitian (81–96 CE), it became part of the new province of Moesia Superior after 86 CE.

Dresnik may have been a temporary imperial residence and certainly held significance for the elite of Ulpiana and possibly for an Illyrian emperor.

Roman settlements in Dardania were generally of two types: Mining settlements near rich ore deposits and agricultural settlements near river valleys.

== Excavations ==
The first excavations at the archaeological site in Dresnik were carried out in 2012 by Masar Valla on behalf of the Archaeological Institute of Kosovo.

A significant find was an imperial summer palace, oriented north–south, consisting of a main hall (aula) and five additional rooms, all with mosaic floors featuring multicolored geometric designs.

=== Main Hall (Aula) ===
The central hall measures 22 x 11 meters, with the entire floor paved in well-preserved mosaic using the opus tessellatum technique. The tesserae are 1 to 1.2 cm in size. Motifs include circles, squares, stars, interwoven patterns, and crosses. The predominant colors are red, black, white, yellow, and brown.

The mosaic is surrounded by three decorative borders and leads to a triclinium through a threshold made of reused marble stelae, some bearing inscriptions.

=== Triclinium ===
Located on the northern side of the aula, the triclinium has an 8-meter diameter and 6-meter depth. It is supported externally by three buttresses. The floor is also decorated with colorful geometric mosaics. A niche in the apse wall might have been used for heating, although no hypocaust was found here. The apse's semi-dome was constructed from trapezoidal bricks.

=== Additional Rooms ===
Room B:

East of the main hall. Measures 4.4 x 4.2 m. Features three entrances and polychrome mosaics, including heart-shaped and braided motifs.

Room C:

East of Room B. Contains a yellow-dominant mosaic with swastikas and 25 circular medallions inside octagons.

Room D:

North of the aula. Measures 9.1 x 4.2 m. Contains two entrances and mosaics with interlocking rhombi and circular medallions.

Room F:

Connector between Rooms D and G. Mosaic motifs include four-petaled flowers and square medallions.

Room G:

Reached via Room F. Floor mosaic includes spirals, Salomon knots, and alternating diamond shapes with central discs.

=== Hypocaust and Bath Complex (Thermae) ===
Discovered in sector 36, the hypocaust room includes a reused basin (4 x 1.4 x 1.4 m). Later, a hypocaust system was added. A fragment of a Juno statue was found in the fill.

=== Fortification Walls ===
The palace is encircled by a defensive wall with circular towers. The uncovered eastern section is 160 meters long and 3.7 meters thick, making it one of the most massive Roman-period walls discovered in the Balkans. Towers measure 10 meters in diameter, with corner towers reaching 16 meters.

=== Sculptures and Stelae ===
Noteworthy finds include two marble statues of Venus (imitating Praxiteles’ Aphrodite of Knidos) and a fragmentary statue of Juno. Also significant are reused funerary stelae, bearing inscriptions of local Romanized Dardanians. One inscription memorializes Flavia Putides, buried by her mother Valeriana.

=== Lead Sarcophagus ===
A rare lead sarcophagus features 20 relief portraits of Mercury and decorative elements like six- and eight-pointed stars. It dates to the late 2nd or early 3rd century CE. Found inside were the remains of a woman, a gold earring, coins, and a perfume bottle (lotore).

=== Necropolis ===
Located on the hill known as "Qelie," the necropolis includes brick-lined graves oriented east–west. Looters uncovered another grave in 2014. This site likely served as the main cemetery for the settlement.

=== Artifacts and Material Culture ===
Findings include imperial Roman coins, highly fragmented ceramics (2nd to 6th centuries), altar fragments (one dedicated to Jupiter), column bases, glass fragments, and other architectural pieces.

=== Conclusions ===
Two main phases: First, an agricultural villa rustica (2nd–3rd c.); second, a larger reconstruction (3rd–4th c.) likely serving the Roman elite.

Economic base: agriculture and livestock; potential military provisioning.

Strategic location: on the Roman road Lissus–Naissus.

Architectural parallels: similarities with Felix Romuliana (Serbia) and Mediana (Niš).

== See also ==
- Archaeology of Kosovo
- History of Kosovo
- Roman heritage in Kosovo
