= Osojane =

Osojane: Osojan (Albanian); Осојане/Osojane (Serbian)
- Village
- Location in Kosovo
- Coordinates: 42°43′04″N 20°33′56″E
- Location: Kosovo
- District: Peja
- Municipality: Istog

Population (2024)
  - Total: 176
- Time zone: UTC+1 (CET)
  - Summer (DST): UTC+2 (CEST)

Osojane (Serbian Cyrillic: Осојане; Albanian: Osojan) is a village in the district of Peja in Kosovo, between the cities of Klina and Istog.

== History ==
Osojane was first mentioned in a chrysobull by the Serbian King Stefan Milutin in 1314. During the reign of the Ottoman Empire, a defter in 1485 recorded the village as having a monastery, consecrated in the name of John the Baptist. However, the monastery disappeared from record and is thought to have occupied the site of the current cemetery in Osojane. In 1999 following the end of the Kosovo War, the entire population of Osojane fled after the village was destroyed. The village was chosen as a showcase for the return of some of the thousands of Serbs who fled Kosovo. Following a $5 million USD investment by the U.S Government and protection from Spanish KFOR troops, 80 Serbs returned to Osojane.

== Demographics ==
The village is almost exclusively inhabited by Serbs.
