= Vitomirica =

Vitomiricë Vitomiricë (Albanian) Витомирица (Serbian)
- Town
- Coat of arms
- Interactive map of Vitomiricë
- Coordinates: 42.681936°N 20.317291°E
- Country: Kosovo
- District: Peja
- Municipality: Peja
- Seat: Assembly of the Republic of Kosovo

Area
  - Total: 21 km^{2} (8.1 sq mi)

Population (2024)
  - Total: 5,122
  - Density: 240/km^{2} (630/sq mi)
- Demonym: Vitomiricas/e
- Time zone: UTC+1 (CET)
  - Summer (DST): UTC+2 (CEST)
- Postal code: 30090
- XK: +383 (04)
- Vehicle registration: 03

Vitomirica (Serbian: Витомирица; Albanian: Vitomiricë) is a town in the municipality of Peja in Kosovo. According to the 2024 census, it has a population of 5,122.
