= Klina =

Town in the District of Peja, Kosovo

Klina: Klina or Klinë (Albanian) Klina or Клина (Serbian)
- Town and municipality
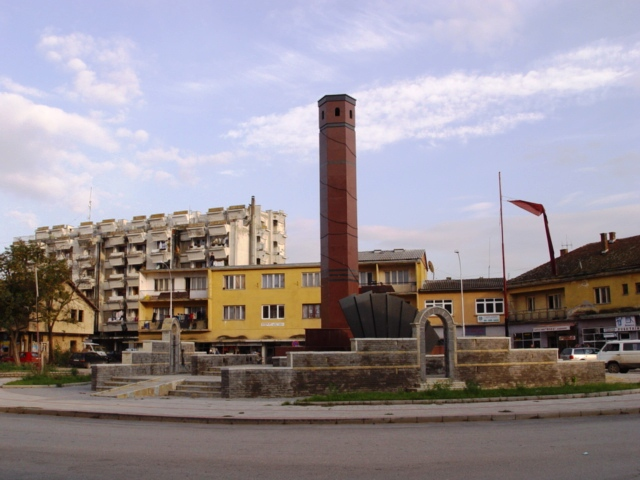
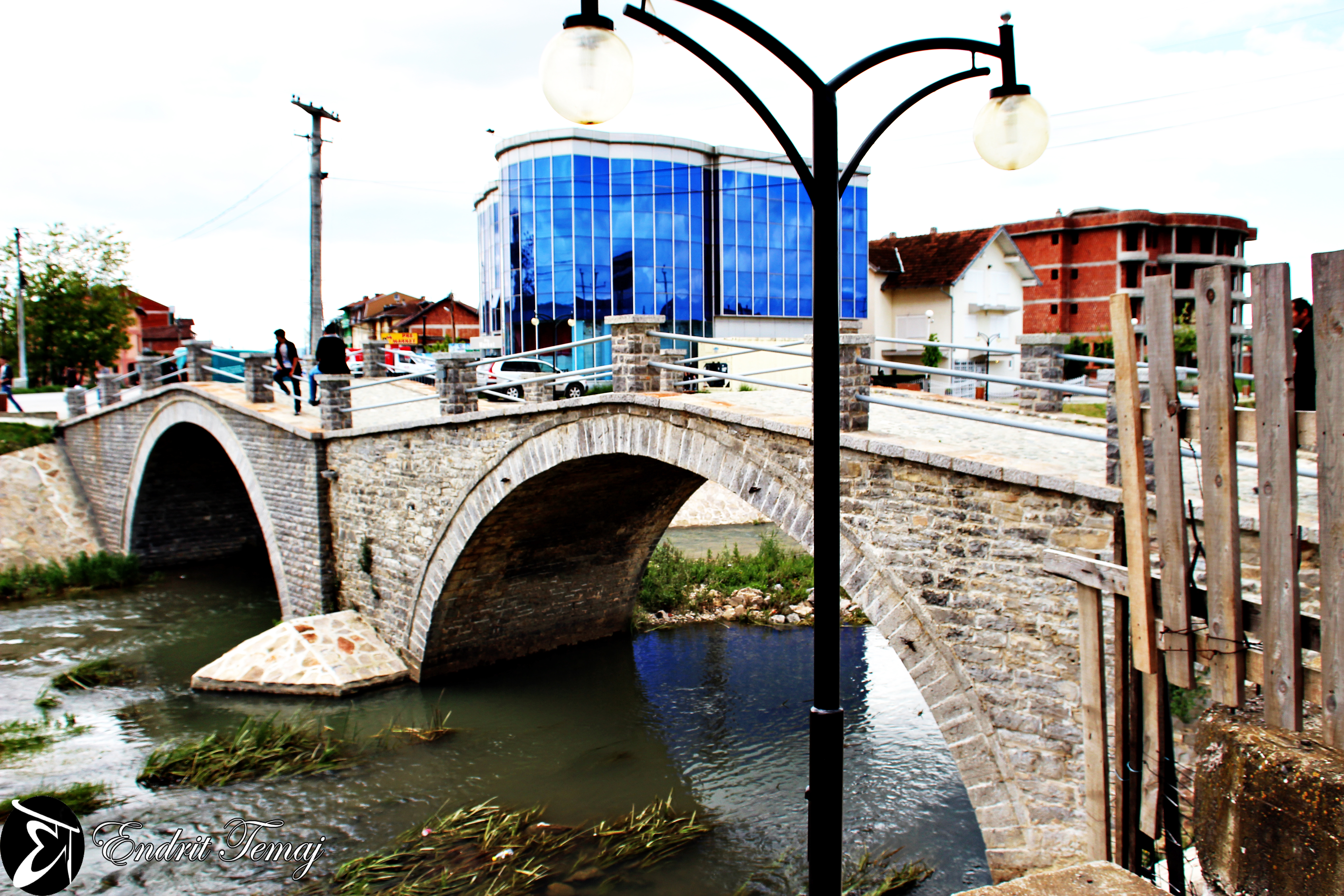
- From the top, Town Centre, Stone Bridge

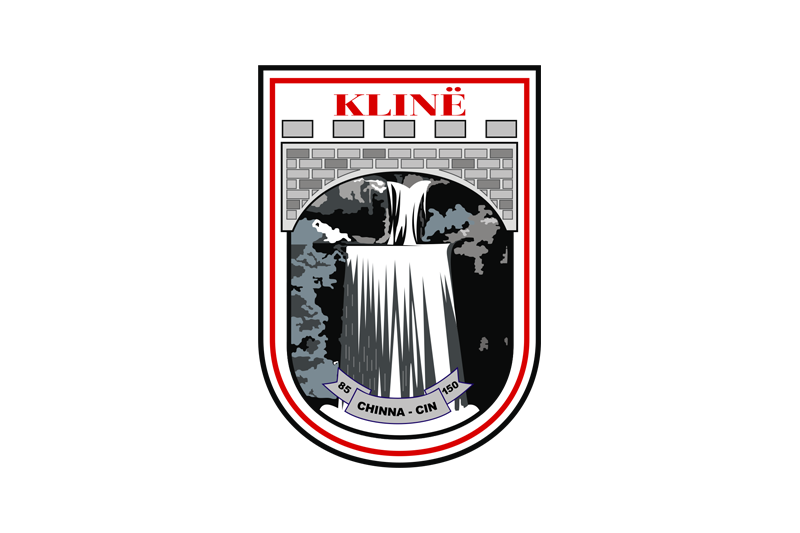
- Flag Emblem
- Interactive map of Klina
- Location within Kosovo
- Coordinates: 42°37′N 20°34′E
- Country: Kosovo
- District: District of Peja
  - Rank: 18th in Kosovo
  - Municipal: 309 km^{2} (119 sq mi)

Population (2024)
  - Municipality: 30,574
  - Urban: 5,542
- Time zone: UTC+1 (CET)
  - Summer (DST): UTC+2 (CEST)
- Postal code: 32000
- Area code: +383
- Vehicle registration: 03
- Website: kk.rks-gov.net/kline

Klina (Albanian definite form: Klina; Serbian Cyrillic: Клина) is a town and municipality located in the District of Peja of north-western Kosovo. According to the 2011 census, the town of Klina has 5,542 inhabitants, while the municipality has 38,496 inhabitants. It is located at the confluence of the river Klina into the White Drin. A symbol of Klina are the Mirusha Waterfalls. On 25 July 2025 a temperature of 42.5 °C (108.5 °F) was registered in Klina, the highest ever temperature registered in Kosovo.

== History ==
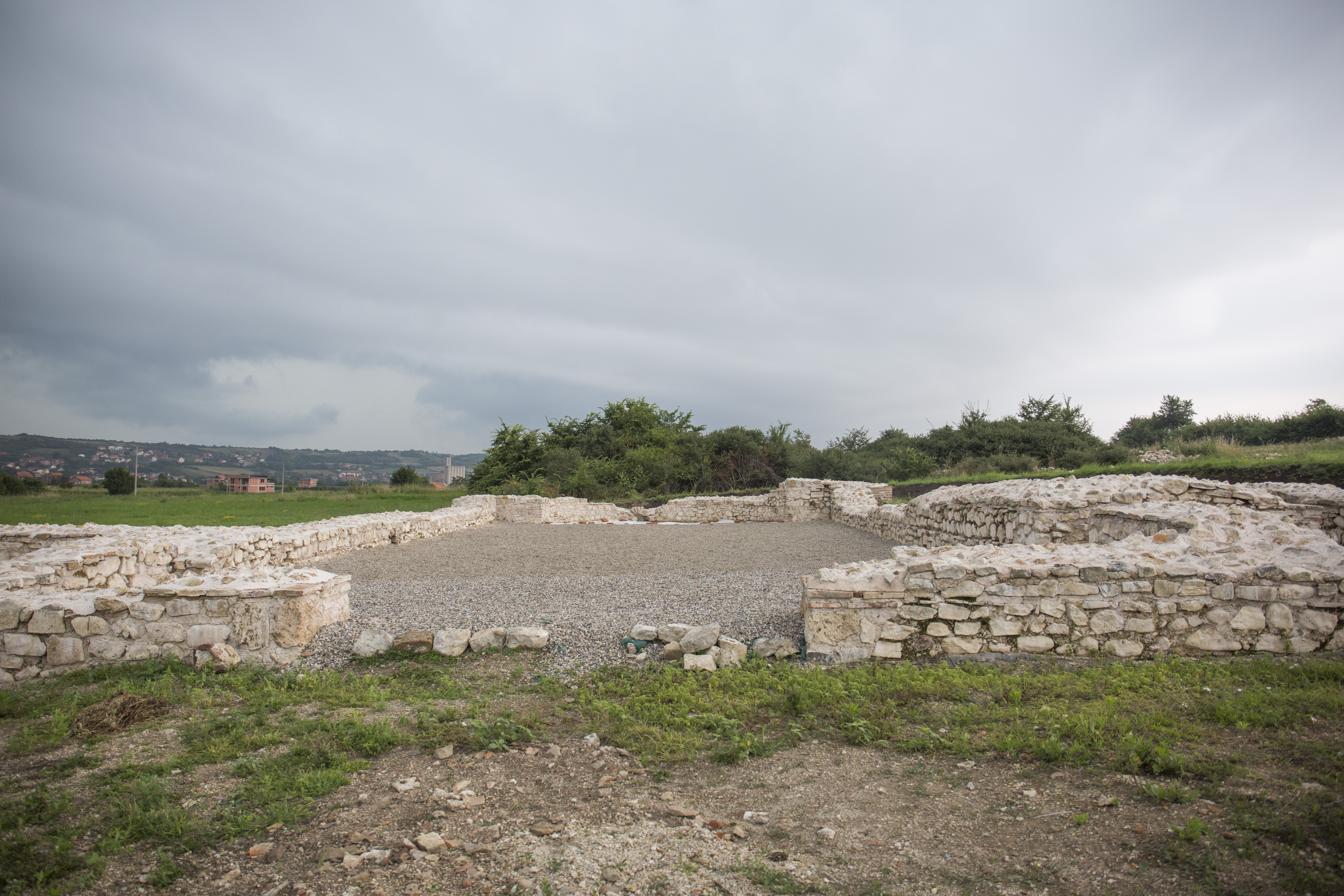
Dresnik archaeological site

During early Middle Ages, Porphyrogenitus mentions the urban center of Desstinik, today Dresnik, where important archeological discoveries of Roman period were made in August 2013, described as: ...the most important discovery of the past few decades to have been made in Kosovo in the area of archaeology. In the village lies the Archaeological Site of Dresnik.

== Economy ==
There is one bauxite mine operating on the territory of Klina - Grebnik mine.

== Demography ==
Historical population
Year	Pop.	±% p.a.
1961	27,153	—
1971	42,351	+4.55%
1981	54,539	+2.56%
1991	52,266	−0.42%
2011	38,496	−1.52%

According to the last official census done in 2011, the municipality of Klina has 38,496 inhabitants. Based on the population estimates from the Kosovo Agency of Statistics in 2016, the municipality has 39,759 inhabitants.

The ethnic composition of the municipality:

Ethnic composition
Year/Population	Albanians	%	Serbs	%	Montenegrins	%	Roma	%	Total
1961	16,756	66.75	7,378	27.17	1,372	5.05	80	0.29	27,153
1971	32,897	78.04	7,864	18.57	1,157	2.73	118	0.28	42,351
1981	45,594	83.60	6,829	12.52	973	1.78	798	1.46	54,539
1991	43,248	82.75	5,209	9.97	621	1.19	1,278	2.45	52,266
January 1999	55,000	78.6	10,000	14.3			5,000	7.1	70,000
2011	37,216	96.7	98	0.25	-	-	78	0.2	38,496
Ref: Yugoslav Population Censuses for data through 1991, Organization for Security and Co-operation in Europe estimates for 1999 and 2006

In September 2014, 12 Egyptian families returned to Klina having spent the last 15 years displaced in Podgorica, Montenegro. The families moved straight into a newly constructed neighbourhood as part of project helping refugees from the Kosovo War return to Kosovo.

== Notable people ==
- Anton Berisha, Kosovo-Albanian folklorist and scholar
- Sadik Rama Gjurgjeviku, Kosovo-Albanian guerrilla fighter
- Mujë Krasniqi, Kosovo Liberation Army
