= District of Peja =

District of Kosovo

Coordinates: 42°39′N 20°17′E

District of Peja: Rajoni i Pejës (Albanian) Pećki okrug/ Пећки округ (Serbian)
- District
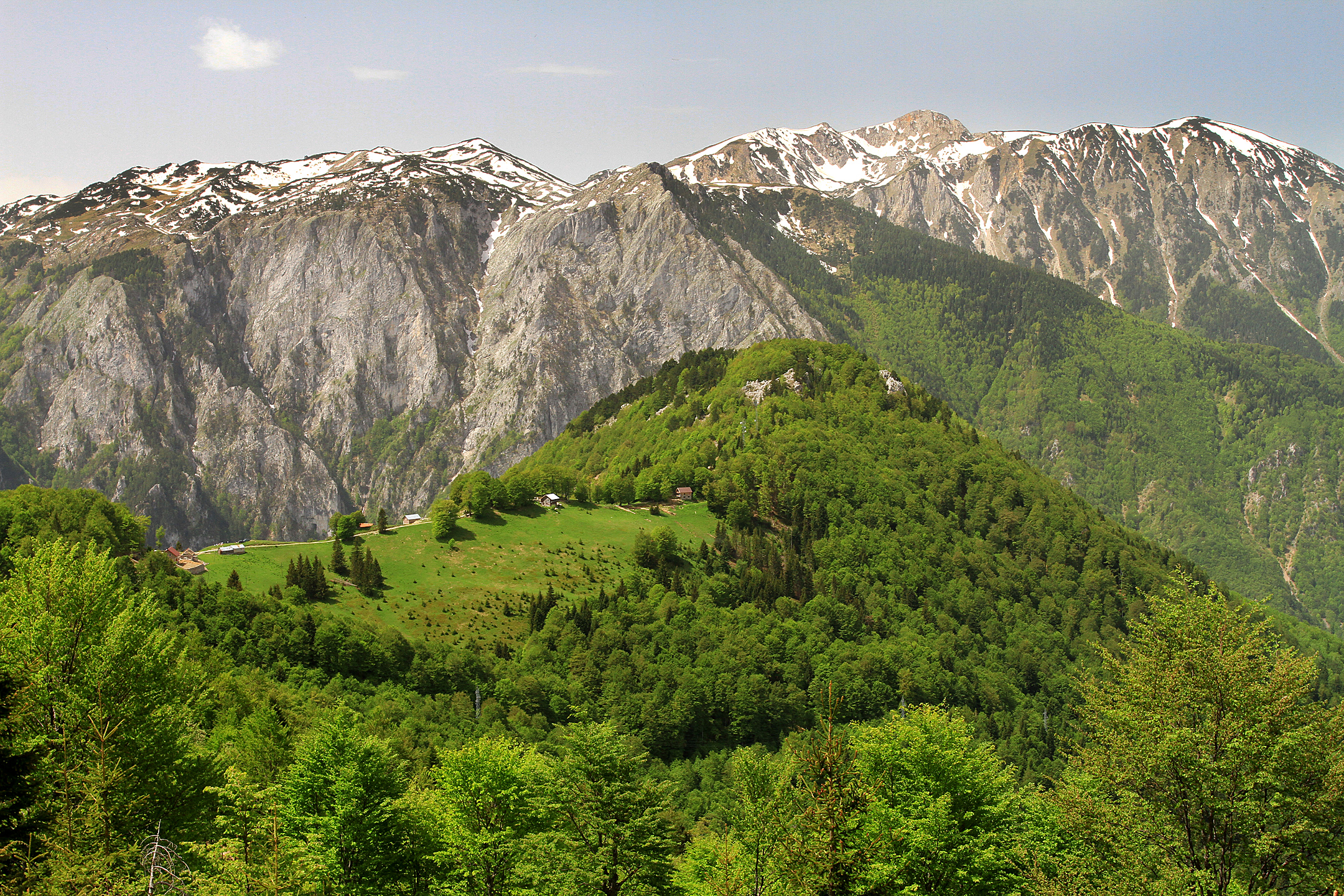
- Rugova region in Peja district

- Location of Peja district in Kosovo
- Interactive map of District of Peja
- Country: Kosovo
- Capital: Peja

Area
  - Total: 1,660 km^{2} (640 sq mi)

Population (2024)
  - Total: 174,031
  - Rank: 7th
  - Density: 105/km^{2} (272/sq mi)
- Postal code: 30000
- Vehicle registration: 03
- Municipalities: 4
- Settlements: 155
- HDI (2023): 0.789 high · 4th

The District of Peja (Albanian: Rajoni i Pejës, Serbian: Пећки округ, romanized: Pećki okrug) is one of the seven districts of Kosovo. It has its seat in the city of Peja. The district has three municipalities and 155 other settlements. According to the 2024 census, the district had 174,031 inhabitants.

== History ==
Peja region has been occupied from the Illyrian era, and was part of ancient Dardania. It is mentioned in the Roman map of Ptholomeus from the 3rd century CE, and was given by various names such as Siparantum, Pech, Peka, and Pentza during various periods of time. Pechi, the Latin name is first mentioned in the documents from 12th century CE.

In the 14th century, Stefan Dusan established the Peja Patriarchy, after separating it from Constantinople. After the Kosovo battle in 1389 CE between the Serbian and Ottoman Empires, the region was under the control of Balshaj family till 1421 and Dukagjini family till 1462. The region came to be a part of Sanjak of Scutari in the 16th century, during which time Islam was introduced to the Catholic population in the region.

In October 1912, Peja region was captured by Montenegro from the Ottomans. It came under the occupation of Austria-Hungary in 1915, and later under the Kingdom of Yugoslavia in 1919. The Italian Empire captured it from Yugoslavia during the Second World War in 1941, and put under the German Empire in 1943. After the end of the war, it was returned to Yugoslavia in 1945, and it went to Serbia after the dissolution of Yugoslavia in 1992. In 1999, Kosovar armed forces captured the region, and later proclaimed independence from Serbia in 2008. The Kosovar war of independence led to massive emigration and large scale damage to properties, with over 80% of the houses destroyed.

== Demographics ==
According to the 2024 census, the district had 174,031 inhabitants, of whom 86,499 were male and 87,532 female. 44,135 people (25.4%) were aged 17 or under. Albanian was the most spoken language with 167,712 (96.4%) speakers, followed by Bosnian (2.3%), Serb (1.0%), and others.

As per the 2024 data, Islam was the dominant religion with 161,194 adherents (92.6%). Christians formed the major minority with 9,459 adherents (5.4%): 7,773 Catholics and 1,686 Orthodox. Albanians formed the majority of the population (93.0%) with other ethnicity such as Romanis, Bosniaks, and Serbs forming a significant minority.

| Ethnicity | Population | Proportion |
|---|---|---|
| Albanians | 161,788 | 93.0% |
| Balkan Egyptians | 4,352 | 2.5% |
| Bosniaks | 4,042 | 2.3% |
| Serbs | 1,685 | 1.0% |
| Others | 2,041 | 1.2% |

== Administration ==
Peja is one of the seven districts of Kosovo. It has its seat in the city of Peja. The district has four municipalities–Peja, Istog, Deçan and Klina and 155 other settlements.

Municipalities
| Municipality | Population (2024) | Area (km2) | Density (km2) | Settlements |
|---|---|---|---|---|
| Peja | 82,745 | 603 | 137.3 | 14 |
| Istog | 33,008 | 454 | 72.6 | 50 |
| Klina | 30,503 | 309 | 98.7 | 54 |
| Deçan | 27,775 | 294 | 94.5 | 37 |
| District of Peja | 174,031 | 1,545 | 104.8 | 155 |

List of settlements:

- Bogë
- Babiq
- Baran
- Bellopaq
- Bellopojë
- Bllagajë
- Breg i Zi
- Brestovikë
- Brezhanik
- Broliq
- Buçan
- Çallapek
- Dobërdol
- Drelaj
- Duboçak
- Dubovë
- Dugaivë
- Gllaviçicë
- Gllogjan
- Goraždevac
- Graboc
- Haxhaj
- Jabllanicë
- Jabllanicë e Madhe
- Jabllanicë e Vogël
- Katund i Ri
- Kërstoc
- Kliqinë
- Koshutan
- Kosuriq
- Kotradiq
- Kryshec
- Kuçishtë
- Leshan
- Lëvoshë
- Lipa
- Loxha
- Lubeniq
- Lutogllavë
- Llabjan
- Llaz-Bellopaq
- Llozhan
- Llugaxhi
- Malaj
- Millovanc
- Nabërgjan
- Nakëll
- Nepolë
- Novosellë
- Osojane
- Ozdrim
- Pavlan
- Pepiq
- Pishtan
- Poçestë
- Qyshk
- Radac
- Ramun
- Rashiq
- Raushiq
- Rekë e Allagës
- Rosulê
- Ruhot
- Sigë
- Stankaj
- Sverkë
- Shkrel
- Shtupeç i Madh
- Shtupeç i Vogël
- Treboviq
- Trestenik
- Turjakë
- Vitomirica
- Vragoc
- Vranoc
- Zagërmë
- Zahaq
- Zllapek

== See also ==
- Religion in Peja District
