= Ground Safety Zone =

5-Kilometre-wide demilitarized zone from 1999-2001

The Ground Safety Zone (Serbian: Копнена зона безбедности, Kopnena zona bezbednosti; Albanian: Zona e Sigurisë Tokësore) was a 5-kilometre-wide (3.1 mi) demilitarized zone (DMZ) established in June 1999 after the signing of the Kumanovo agreement which ended the Kosovo War. It bordered the area between Yugoslavia (FRY) and Kosovo (governed by the UN).

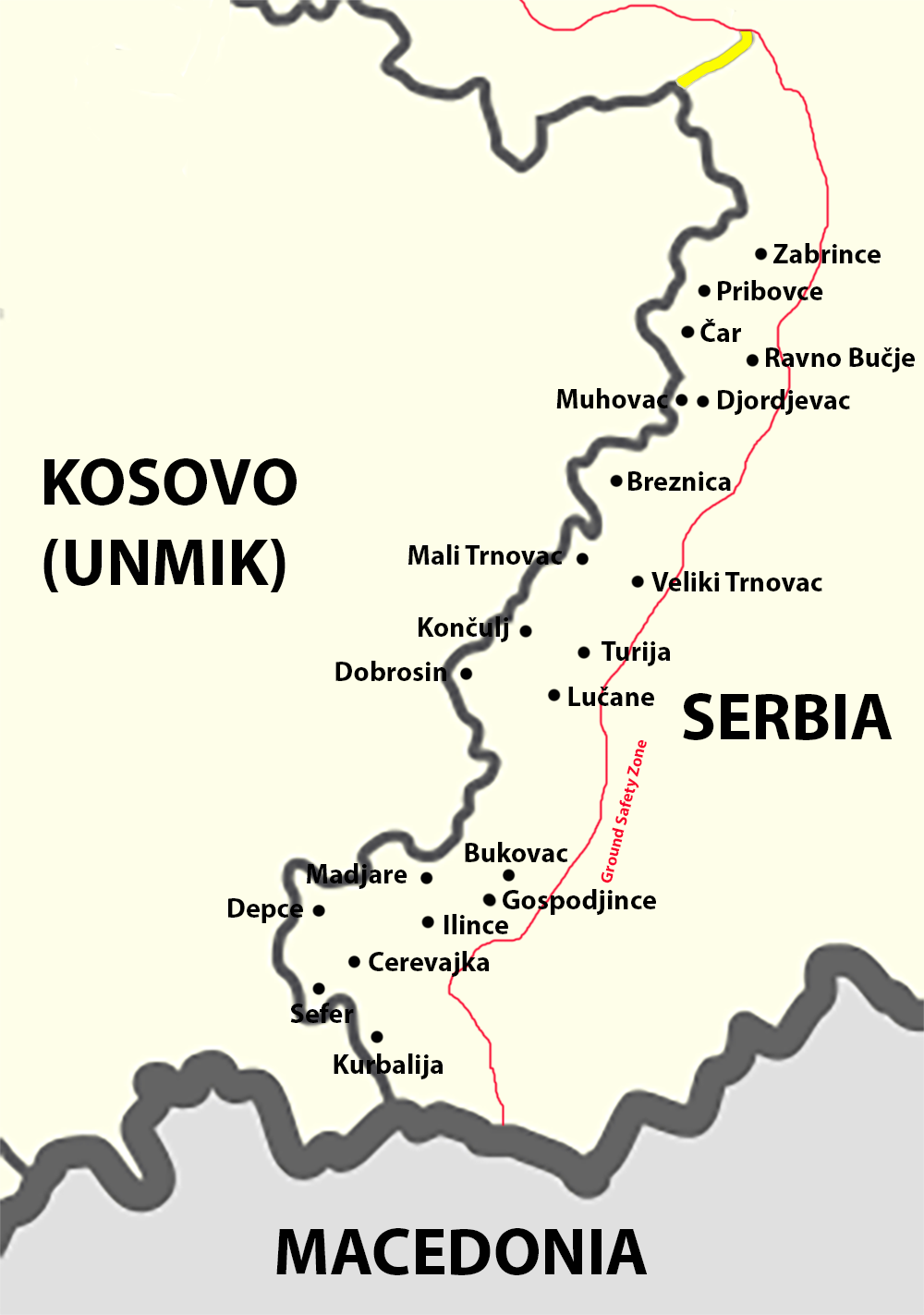
Map of the Ground Safety Zone. Note that this is not the entirety of the GSZ, but the area in which the UÇPMB controlled up to the yellow line.

== Background ==
In 1992–1993, ethnic Albanians created the Kosovo Liberation Army (KLA) which started attacking police forces and secret-service officials who abused Albanian civilians in 1995. According to Serbian officials, the KLA killed 10 policemen and 24 civilians. After escalating tensions between increasing Yugoslav security forces and the KLA, the Kosovo War started in February 1998.

== Creation of the GSZ ==
With the signing of the Kumanovo agreement, the provisions designed the creation of a 5-kilometre-wide safety zone around Kosovo's border and into the FRY if necessary. A 25-kilometre-wide air safety zone was also designed by the provisions of the agreement. Only lightly armed police in groups of up to ten were allowed to patrol, and banned the FRY from using planes, tanks or any other heavier weapons. The GSZ consisted of 5 sectors:

- Sector C west – from Plav to the Albanian border
- Sector A – from Rožaje to Medveđa
- Sector D – parts of Medveđa, Leskovac, Lebane and Vranje municipalities
- Sector B – from Medveđa to Preševo
- Sector C east – border with Macedonia to village of Norča

== Insurgency in the Preševo Valley ==
In June 1999, a new Albanian militant insurgent group was formed by Shefket Musliu, called the Liberation Army of Preševo, Medveđa and Bujanovac (UÇPMB), began training in the GSZ, which was witnessed by the Kosovo Force (KFOR). The group began attacking Serbian civilians and police, with the goal of joining Preševo, Medveđa and Bujanovac into Kosovo, which escalated into an insurgency.

Due to the FRY's inability to use any heavy weapons against the UÇPMB, the group expanded and occupied all villages related to Sectors B and C east, with the exception of Gramada. They divided the sectors into three zones:

- North zone – Muhovac (command), Ravno Bučje, Pribovce, Zarbince, Suharno, Đorđevac, Čar
- Center zone – Veliki Trnovac (command), Breznica, Mali Trnovac, Dobrosin, Končulj, Lučane, Turija
- South zone – Bukovac, Gospođince, Mađare, Ilince, Depce, Masurica, Sefer, Kurbalija, Gornja Šušaja, Karadak

The North zone was commanded by Muhamet Xhemajli, the Center zone was commanded by Ridvan Qazimi, and the South zone was commanded by commanded by Shaqir Shaqiri. After his arrest in 2001, he was replaced with Mustafa Shaqiri. The UÇPMB only attacked Serbs from a distance with mortars, so the Serbs couldn't respond. After the overthrow of Slobodan Milošević on 5 October 2000, Vojislav Koštunica wanted the United States to reduce or disband the GSZ, with KFOR mediating a ceasefire on 24 November.

Many battles occurred along the GSZ, such as on 4 March 2000, around 500 UÇPMB fighters attacked the city of Dobrosin. The battle resulted in one UÇPMB and one Serb fighter killed, while another 175 were displaced. On 21 November, members of the UÇPMB attacked the city of Dobrosin and the surrounding villages. Heavy fighting resulted in the VJ retreating to Končulj, Lučane, and Bujanovac. After four policemen were killed and two wounded by the UÇPMB, the VJ retreated back to the GSZ.

On 6 January 2001, the UÇPMB took control of Gornja Šušaja, and were well received by the locals. On 19 January, in command of Bardhyl Osmani, raided VJ positions near Crnotince. On 20 January, the VJ launched an attack against the UÇPMB stronghold. The battle lasted for four days when VJ forces were forced to withdraw to the GSZ. These fierce battles, witnessed by NATO, were the starting point for the VJ to enter the GSZ, called Operation Return.

=== Operation Return ===
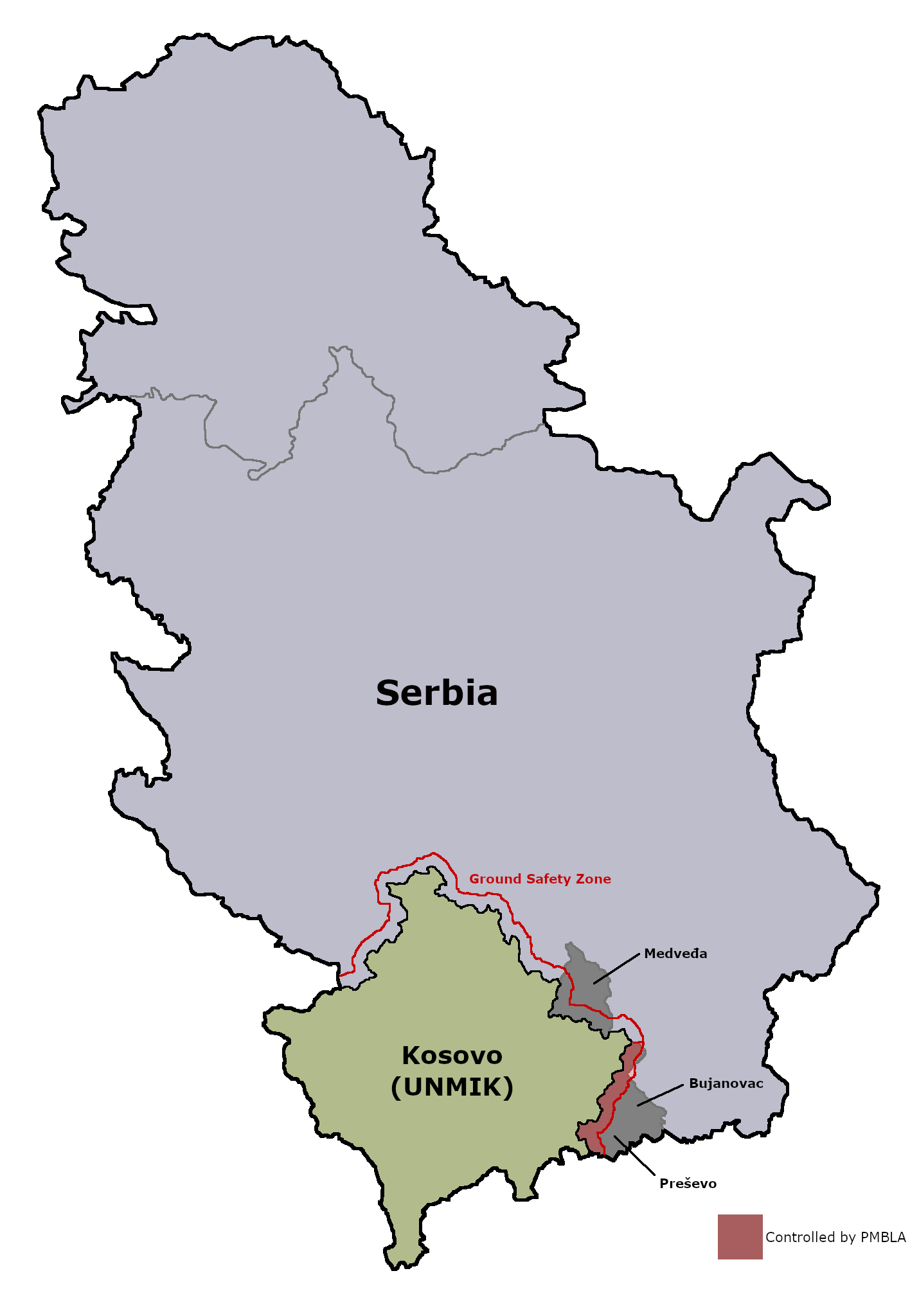
Serbia UÇPMB Kosovo (KFOR and UNMIK)

On 14 March 2001, at 6:30 am, after the fiercest fighting in the area since the Kosovo War, NATO allowed Yugoslav forces into Sector C east. The president at the time, Vojislav Koštunica, was told by Nebojša Pavković that the operation was going successfully, as the troops found no mines nor any UÇPMB rebels. KFOR helicopters supervised the VJ during the retaking. On 22 March 2001, the KFOR command led by General Kabigoszu, in a meeting with Yugoslav representatives in Merdare, allowed Yugoslav forces to enter Sector C west and Sector A. The entry started on 25 March 2001 at 7:00 am, with the Second Army of the VJ retaking about 1300 km^{2}. Ninoslav Krstić met with the KFOR representative in Merdare on 2 April 2001. On 12 April 2001, an agreement was signed between Krstić and Nebojša Čović, the head of Coordination Center for Southern Serbia, along with KFOR representatives. Yugoslav troops entered Sector D on 14 April 2001, with monitoring by KFOR troops, EU observers, and journalists. No provocations by UÇPMB rebels happened after the retaking of Sector D.

On 13 May 2001, Yugoslav troops and Serbian policemen, accompanied by the 63rd Parachute Brigade and the 72nd Brigade for Special Operations, launched an attack on the UÇPMB in Oraovica before they entered Sector B. The fighting began at 6:10 am when Yugoslav troops entered the city. At 7:00 am UÇPMB rebels attacked Serbian police and fired three rockets towards Oraovica and Serb positions. Attacks from the rebels stopped at 8:00 am, when Serbs appealed to the UÇPMB to surrender, which they declined. On 14 May 2001, the VJ captured the city after the UÇPMB attacked at 2:15 pm.

On 21 May 2001, Shefket Musliu, Mustafa Shaqiri, Ridvan Qazimi, and Muhamet Xhemajli signed the Končulj Agreement, which resulted in the full demilitarization, demobilization, and disarmament of the UÇPMB. The agreement stated that the Yugoslav troops was allowed to enter the rest of the GSZ by 31 May 2001. At the same time, the Serbian side agreed to sign the Statement on conditional amnesty for members of the UÇPMB, which promised amnesty to UÇPMB members from 23 May 2001. The agreement was witnessed by Sean Sullivan, head of the NATO office for Yugoslavia. Two zones of Sector B were to be handed over the Yugoslav troops:

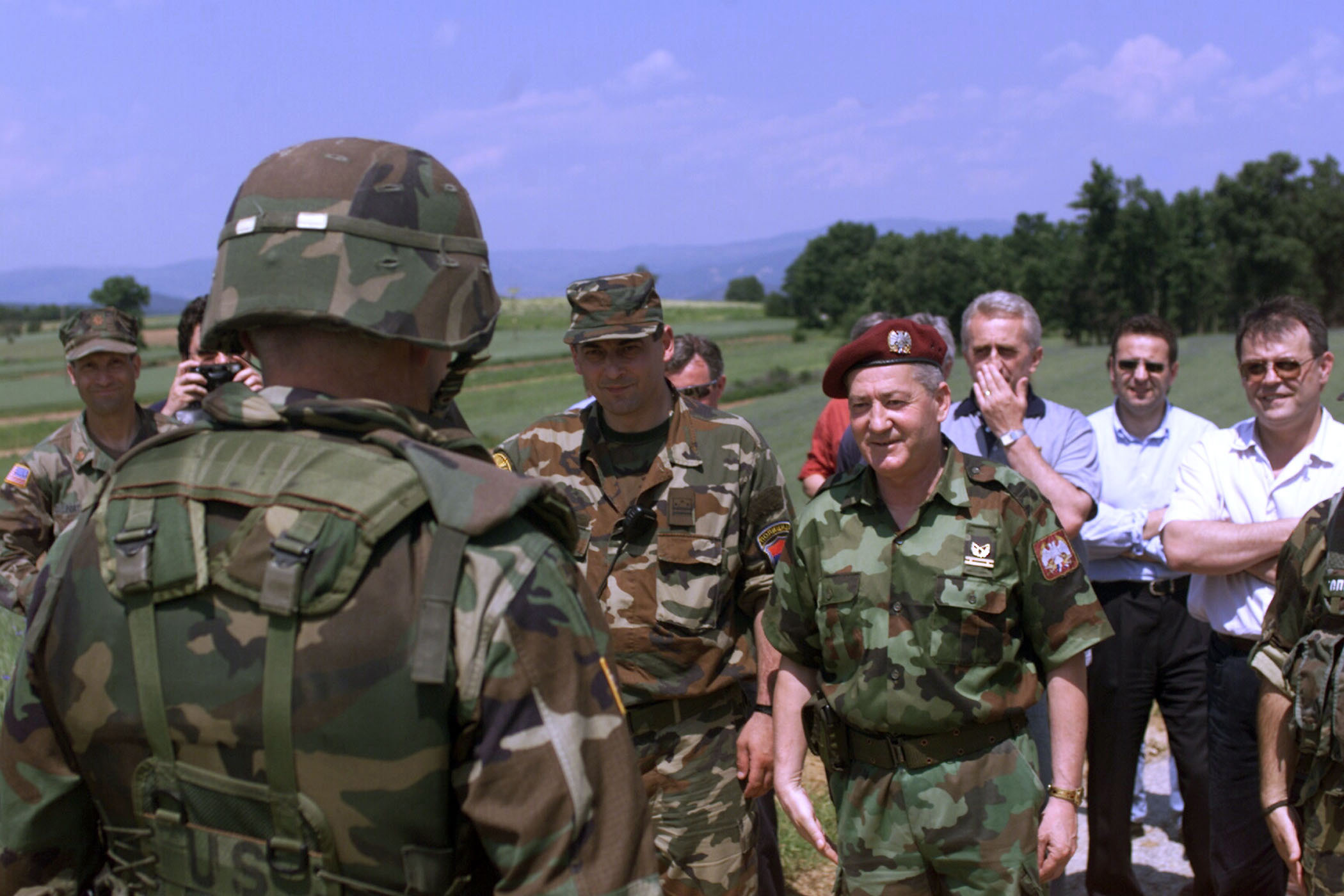
Kenneth Quinlan, Ninoslav Krstić and Nebojša Čović before Yugoslav forces entered Sector B of the GSZ

- Zone B South by 22 May
- Zone B Center by 31 May

Krstić, along with a KFOR Commander, met in Merdare to sign a document which promised the return of Sector B. After the signing of the document, special anti-terrorist and anti-trust units of the Joint Security Forces were present during the retaking to provide security for the troops. The first Yugoslav troops entered Sector B on 24 May 2001, with occupying 90 percent of the B south and B center zones without any confrontations from UÇPMB rebels. An hour and thirty minute battle with the UÇPMB in Veliki Trnovac had left commander Ridvan Qazimi dead, where it had been revealed he had been killed by a sniper. Čović stated he praised how the troops entered B south and B north, and stated the Yugoslav Army will not enter B center due to the high numbers of rebels until 31 May. The VJ entered B center on 31 May at 12:00 when troops entered the administrative line along Kosovo.

== Disbandment of the GSZ and aftermath ==
After Yugoslav troops entered Sector B on 31 May 2001 and the disbandment of the UÇPMB because of the Končulj Agreement, the GSZ was fully disbanded. With the end of the insurgency in Preševo, many former members of the UÇPMB joined the National Liberation Army (NLA) to fight the Macedonian government, demanding more rights for Macedonian Albanians. On 13 August 2001, the Ohrid Agreement was signed, ending the 2001 insurgency in Macedonia. The agreement provided more rights to Macedonian Albanians and disbanded the NLA. A full relaxation of the GSZ was announced on 17 August.

Another Albanian paramilitary organization Albanian National Army (ANA) also had former UÇPMB fighters. The group is associated with FBKSh (National Front for Reunification of Albanians), its political wing. The group participated in attacks against Macedonian forces with the NLA. After the NLA disbanded, the ANA later went and operated in the Preševo Valley.
