= Insurgency in the Preševo Valley =

1999–2001 armed conflict in Yugoslavia

Coordinates: 42.3056°N 21.6428°E

- Part of the Yugoslav Wars
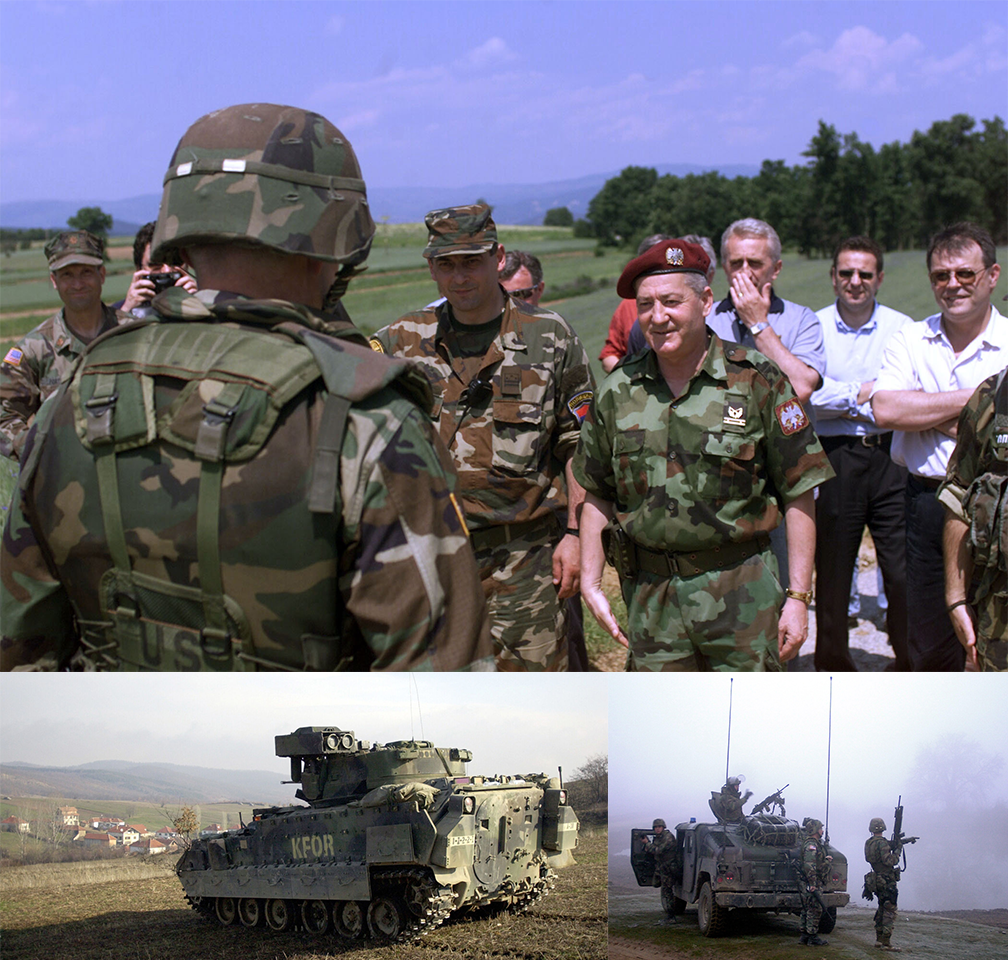
- Clockwise from top-left: Kenneth Quinlan, Ninoslav Krstić and Nebojša Čović before Serb forces entered Ground Safety Zone, KFOR patrolling along Kosovo-Serbia border
Date	12 June 1999 – 1 June 2001 (1 year, 11 months, 2 weeks and 6 days) (Note: Main phase: 21 November 2000 – 31 August 2001.)
Location	Ground Safety Zone and Albanian populated settlements outside it in Preševo, Bujanovac, and Medveđa municipalities, FR Yugoslavia
Result	Yugoslav victory: Končulj Agreement; Yugoslavia retakes the buffer zone; Disbandment of UÇPMB and amnesty for members; Surrender of UÇPMB high command; Low intensity skirmishes continue
Territorial changes	FR Yugoslavia regains control of demilitarized Ground Safety Zone, including around 580 square kilometres (220 sq mi) previously held by the UÇPMB

Belligerents
UÇPMB	FR Yugoslavia KFOR

Commanders and leaders
Shefket Musliu (surrendered); Muhamet Xhemajli (surrendered); Ridvan Qazimi †; Njazi Azemi †; Bardhyl Osmani †; Shaqir Shaqiri; Mustafa Shaqiri (surrendered); Arben Ramadani †; Pacir Shicri (surrendered); Tahir Dalipi (surrendered); Lirim Jakupi	(Federal Republic of Yugoslavia) Slobodan Milošević (Federal Republic of Yugoslavia) Vojislav Koštunica (Federal Republic of Yugoslavia) Nebojša Pavković (Federal Republic of Yugoslavia) Vladimir Lazarević (Federal Republic of Yugoslavia) Ninoslav Krstić (Federal Republic of Yugoslavia) Goran Radosavljević (Federal Republic of Yugoslavia) Milorad Ulemek (Federal Republic of Yugoslavia) Nebojša Čović

Strength
1,600 militants	3,500–5,000 personnel 100 JSO members 100 SAJ members

Casualties and losses
27 militants killed 400 militants surrendered to KFOR; 150 militants surrendered to the Serbian Police	(Serbia and Montenegro) 18 policemen and soldiers killed (Federal Republic of Yugoslavia) 68 soldiers and policemen wounded
- 15 civilians killed (8 Serbs and 7 Albanians) and 25 wounded (United Nations) 2 UN observers wounded 15,000 refugees

The insurgency in the Preševo Valley was an approximately two year-long armed conflict between 12 June 1999 until 1 June 2001, between the Federal Republic of Yugoslavia and the ethnic Albanian separatists of the Liberation Army of Preševo, Medveđa and Bujanovac (UÇPMB). There were instances during the conflict in which the Yugoslav government requested Kosovo Force (KFOR) support in suppressing UÇPMB attacks since they could only use lightly armed military forces as part of the Kumanovo Treaty that ended the Kosovo War, which created a buffer zone between FR Yugoslavia and Kosovo.

== Background ==
Before the insurgency, Preševo Valley was home to approximately 100,000 people, of whom 70,000 were Albanians and another 30,000 Serbs. Albanians make up to 95% of Preševo, 63% of Bujanovac and 26% of Medveđa population. The Albanian-populated region became a part of Serbia in 1913, after the First Balkan War.

From 1945–46, Preševo and Bujanovac were a part of the newly established Autonomous Oblast of Kosovo and Metohija inside the Federated State of Serbia. In 1946 they were transferred to Central Serbia in exchange for a part of Serb inhabited modern-day North Kosovo. During the breakup of Yugoslavia, on 1 and 2 March 1992 Albanians from Preševo Valley held a referendum about their future status in Serbia. 97% of voters demanded autonomy for the valley and the right to join the Republic of Kosova. The Serbian government rejected the referendum, declaring it as unconstitutional and illegal.

In 1992–93, ethnic Albanians created the Kosovo Liberation Army (KLA), which started attacking police forces and secret-service officials in retaliation for the abuse of Albanian civilians in 1995. According to Serbian officials, the KLA killed 10 policemen and 24 civilians from 1996 to February 1998. After escalating tensions between increasing Yugoslav security forces and the KLA, the Kosovo War started in February 1998.

The war itself was a parallel conflict between the Yugoslav Army and the KLA. It began in February 1998 and ended on 10 June 1999, when the Kumanovo Agreement was signed. According to the agreement, KFOR troops, supervised by the United Nations, would enter as a peacekeeping force, while Yugoslav Army forces were to withdraw. It was agreed that the KLA would disband by 19 September 1999. According to the agreement, there would be a demilitarized zone around Kosovo, five-kilometer wide, which served as a buffer zone between KFOR troops and the Yugoslav army. Only light-armed Serbian police members were allowed to patrol the area. This buffer zone was used by Albanian guerrillas for attacks against Serbian forces. The Preševo valley conflict erupted in June 1999, but there was no major fighting until 2000.

== Ground Safety Zone ==
With the signing of the Kumanovo agreement, the provisions designed the creation of a 5-kilometre-wide safety zone around Kosovo's border and into the FRY if necessary. A 25-kilometre-wide air safety zone was also designed by the provisions of the agreement. Only lightly armed police in groups of up to ten were allowed to patrol, and banned the FRY from using planes, tanks or any other heavier weapons. The GSZ consisted of 5 sectors:

- Sector C west – from Plav to the Albanian border
- Sector A – from Rožaje to Medveđa
- Sector D – parts of Medveđa, Leskovac, Lebane and Vranje municipalities
- Sector B – from Medveđa to Preševo
- Sector C east – border with Macedonia to village of Norča

== UÇPMB ==
Shortly after the arrival of KFOR in Kosovo in June 1999, a new Albanian militant insurgent group called the Liberation Army of Preševo, Medveđa and Bujanovac (UÇPMB), began training in the GSZ, which was witnessed by the KFOR. It was led by Shefket Musliu. The group began attacking Serbian civilians and police, with the goal of joining Preševo, Medveđa and Bujanovac into Kosovo.

Due to the FRY's inability to use any heavy weapons against the UÇPMB, the group expanded and occupied all villages related to Sectors B and C east, with the exception of Gramada. They divided the sectors into three zones:

- North zone – Muhovac (command), Ravno Bučje, Pribovce, Zarbince, Suharno, Đorđevac, Čar
- Center zone – Veliki Trnovac (command), Breznica, Mali Trnovac, Dobrosin, Končulj, Lučane, Turija
- South zone – Bukovac, Gospođince, Mađare, Ilince, Depce, Masurica, Sefer, Kurbalija, Gornja Šušaja, Karadak

The North zone was commanded by Muhamet Xhemajli, the Center zone was commanded by Ridvan Qazimi, and the South zone was commanded by commanded by Shaqir Shaqiri. After his arrest in 2001, he was replaced with Mustafa Shaqiri. The UÇPMB only attacked Serbs from a distance with mortars, so the Serbs couldn't respond.

== History ==
=== 1999 ===
After the KLA disbanded according to the peace agreement that ended Kosovo War, its veterans and members founded the UÇPMB in a village of Dobrosin. Their goal was the secession of three Albanian populated municipalities from Serbia and their annexation to Kosovo. Fighting between police and separatist began in June 1999 in the municipality of Kuršumlija, and later spread to Medveđa, Bujanovac and Preševo. The UÇPMB established many bases in mountains and plains around the towns of Bujanovac and Preševo. The militants were centered in the village of Veliki Trnovac. Because of restricted movement in that area, police and army were unable to stop them. On 21 November two policeman were killed by land mine. Serbs responded on attacks with more checkpoints and patrols. During 1999, rebels did not enter an open conflict with the police. Instead, they battled them with the mortars from the distance, so Serbs were unable to respond.

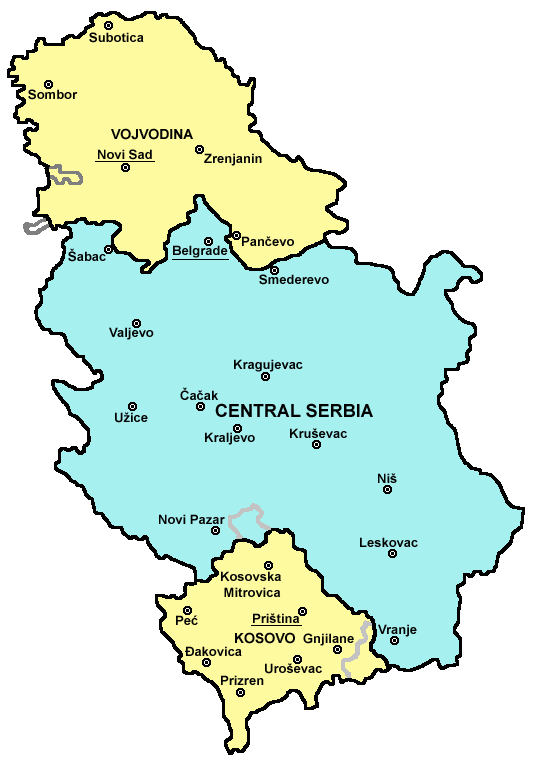
Map of Federated State of Serbia compared to present-day borders( Present day borders 1945 borders)

=== 2000 ===
Conflict escalated in 2000. On 16 January, three Serbs civilians from village Pasjane were killed by rebels in a Ground Safety Zone on a road Gjilan–Preševo. The UÇPMB made their first appearance on 26 January 2000, at the funeral of two Albanian brothers who had been killed in a firefight between the Serbian police and Albanian residents in Dobrosin. On 4-5 March, the UÇPMB attacked Dobrosin, resulting in clashes with Serb policemen. During the fighting, 175 civilians were displaced from the village and fled to neighbouring Kosovo. During the battle one UÇPMB insurgent and one Serb policeman were killed, while two Serb policemen were wounded.

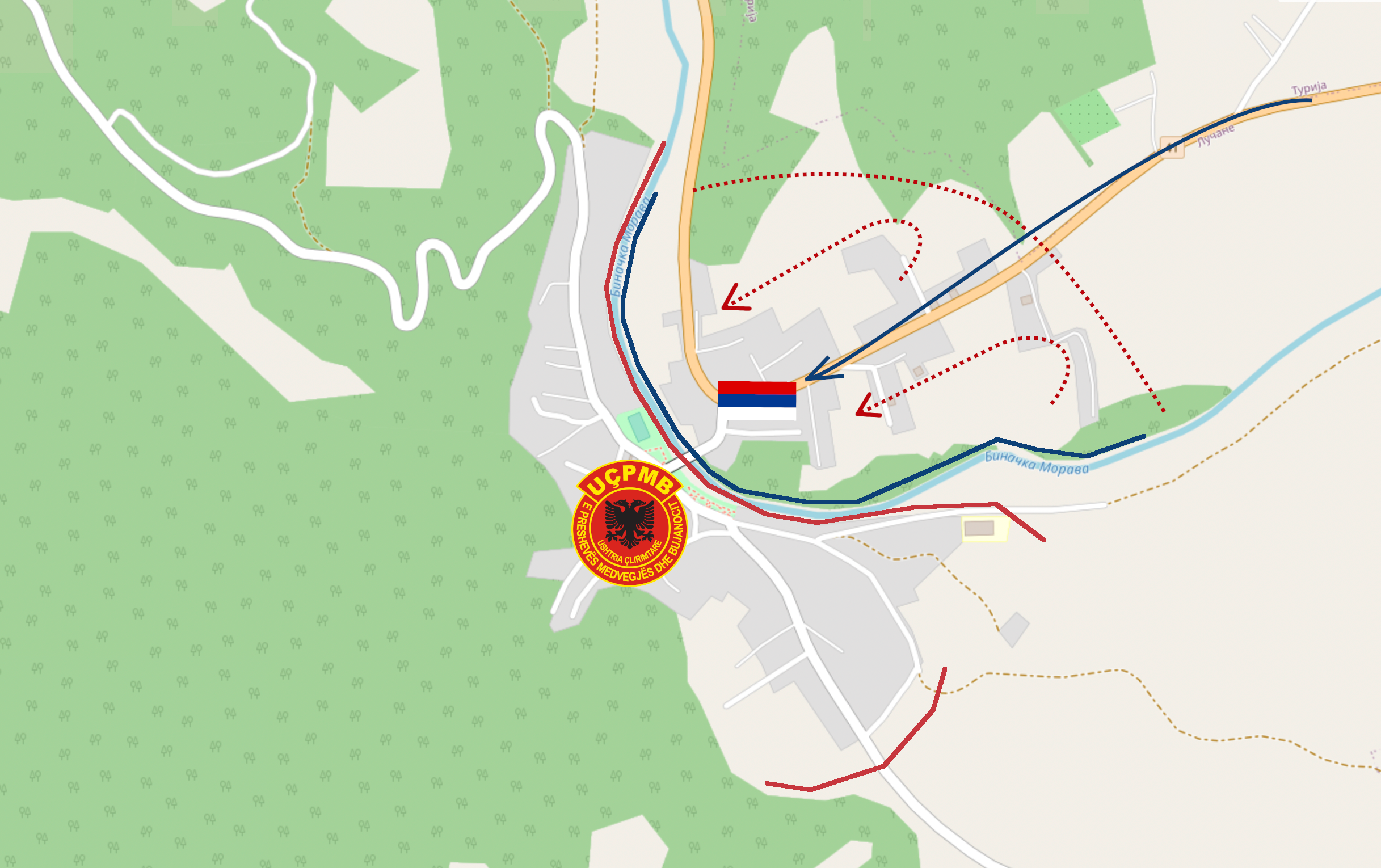
Counteroffensive of Serbian Police in the village of Lučane on 27 November 2000

In July 2000, the UÇPMB clashed with Serbian security forces in an attempt to take over the town of Bujanovac. The battle was conducted in the areas of Končulj, Dobrosin, Lučane and Devojačka Čuka as well as in the wider area around Mali Trnovac, Muhovac and Đorđevac. After the overthrow of Slobodan Milošević, the new government requested that NATO and KFOR suspend the demilitarized zone around Kosovo, in fear that a new war could erupt. Vojislav Koštunica wanted the US to reduce or disband the zone.

The fighting intensified in November 2000, when the police, under the influence of a threefold strength of the UÇPMB, withdrew from the security checkpoints that were fought, occupying defensive positions closer to Bujanovac. On 21 November, about 500 guerrillas were unhindered from Kosovo to the municipality of Bujanovac, and in addition to the presence of strong forces of the American KFOR contingent with the administrative line of Serbia and Kosovo. In the period from 12:25 –17:00 on 21 November, Albanians committed synchronized attacks on the Dobrosin security checkpoint, and on the positions of the police on the corners of Devojačka Čuka and Osoje. Three policemen were killed and five wounded by sniper fire from the UÇPMB. After the shooting, the Ministry of Affairs conducted a counter-terrorism operation.

On 22 November, ten Albanians were detained by KFOR. The bodies of four killed Serbian policemen were found near the village of Končulj, several others were wounded. On 23 November, KFOR troops closed the demilitarised border zone. Albanian rebels carried out an attack with 5 mines from mortars and brownies to the police patrol in the village of Djordjevac. On 24 November, the Serbian government threatened to send in their forces to the demilitarized region if KFOR had not found a way to end the attacks by 72 hours. Božo Prelević, one of Serbia's three interior ministers, said Serbian police would return to the zone "with all available means" unless a deadline to end the attacks end was met. On 25 November, a KFOR–mediated ceasefire was reached.

From 30–31 December, on the road from Gjian–Preševo, the UÇPMB took six Serbian civilians hostage. They were all released shortly after through the mediation of the KFOR and Yugoslavia.

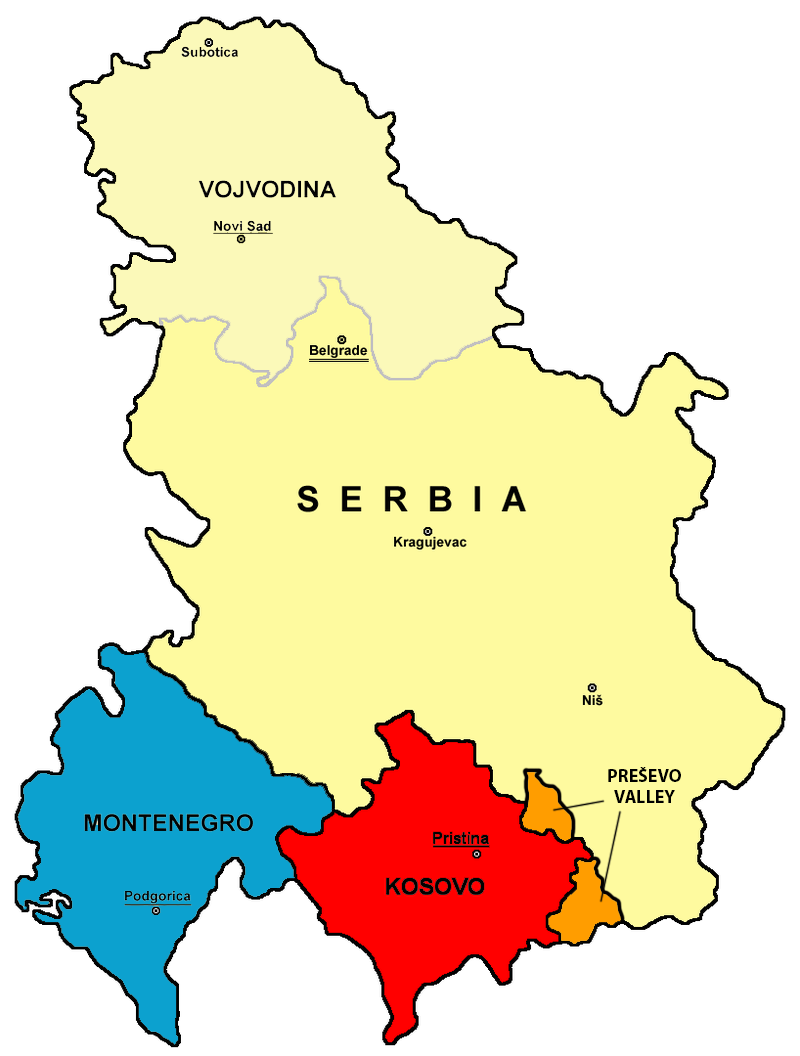
Territory of Preševo Valley claimed by Albanian irredentists

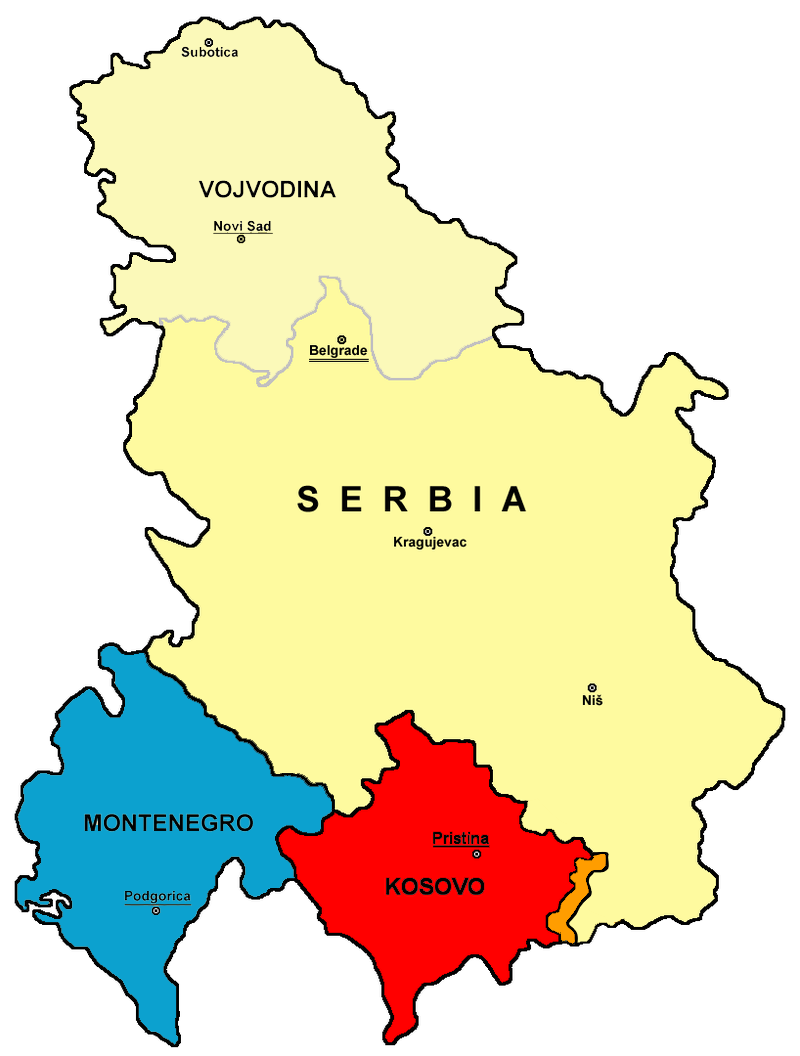
Territory controlled by Liberation Army of Preševo, Medveđa and Bujanovac in 2001

=== 2001 ===
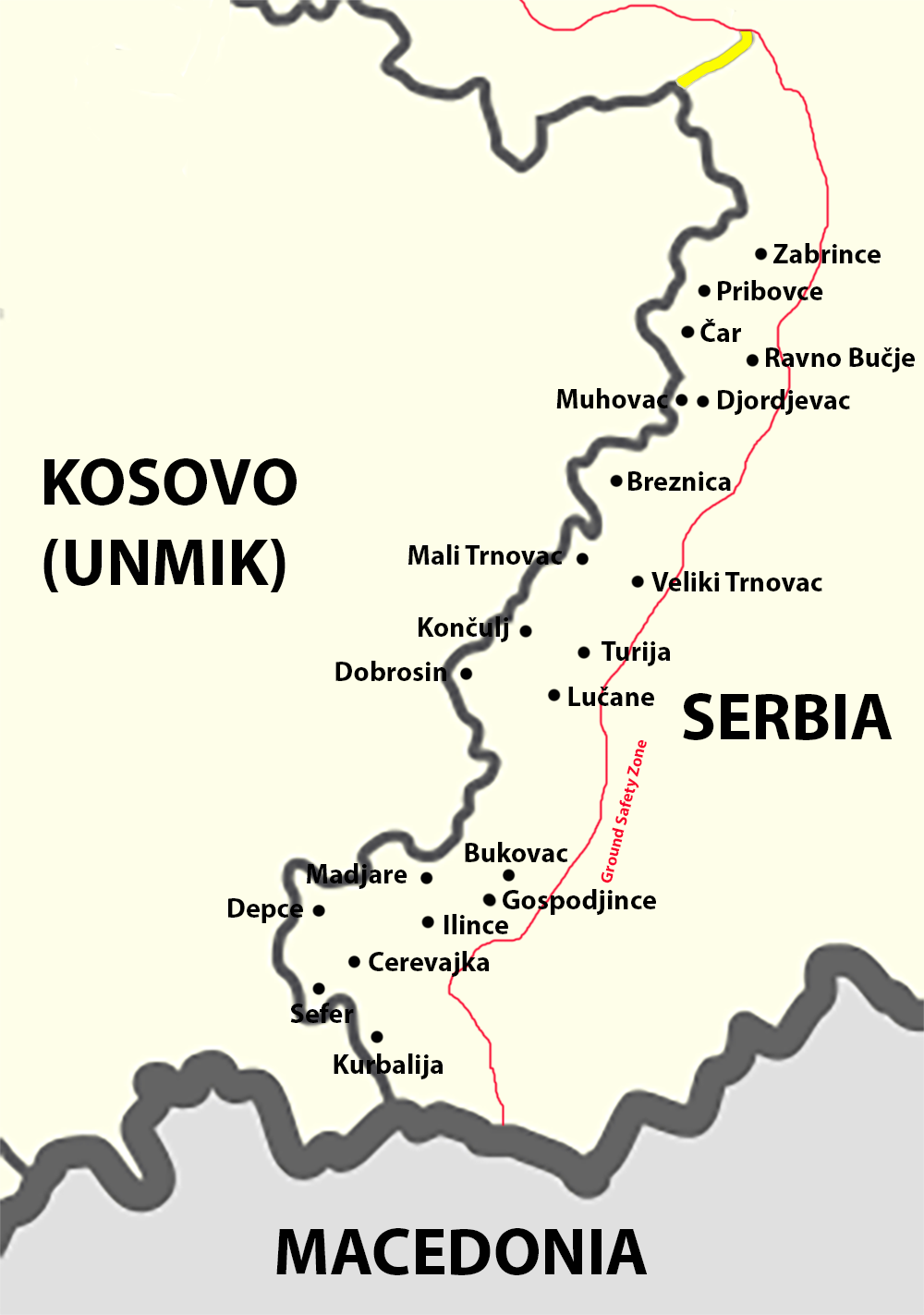
Villages under the control of UÇPMB in 2000

On 5 February, the fiercest fighting in the Preševo valley happened since the end of the 1999 Kosovo conflict. The Yugoslav army exchanged artillery fire for several hours across the internationally imposed buffer zone next to the border with Kosovo. On 16 February, near the border town of Podujevo, seven Serb civilians were killed after a Niš-Ekspres bus with refugees from Kosovo was blown up by the UÇPMB. After that, on 7 March 2001, KFOR agreed to allow Serb military to reoccupy the GSZ section by section. In one village where the UÇPMB still stood, a guerrilla fighter died in an accidental explosion. At the same time Albanian guerrillas started mutiny in Republic of Macedonia. During the March one-week ceasefire was agreed again, after four policeman were killed.

The army first entered the section on a border with Republic of Macedonia (Sector C East), in order to stop illegal arms smuggling. Afterwards KFOR allowed Serbs to return to Sector C West and A on 25 March, and zone D on 14 April. On 21 May Albanian commanders signed the Končulj agreement and agreed to disarm, but many continued to fight. Last section was around Preševo (sector B). On 24 May, the Serbian army entered the town, although Albanian fighters were attacking them. There, one of the rebel commanders, Ridvan Qazimi "Lleshi" was killed. It is not clear whether he was killed by police or by other insurgents. After the Serb victory, the UÇPMB agreed to disarm. During the 2001 insurgency in Macedonia, the UÇPMB continuously funded and supported the NLA until there disarmament on 21 May 2001. Some of its veterans joined newly formed National Liberation Army in Republic of Macedonia. Around 400 guerrillas surrendered in order to get the pardon from the Yugoslav government. UÇPMB commander Shefket Musliu surrendered to KFOR on 26 May. Until August 2001, there were around 1,160 attacks on Serb police and civilians.

== Čović's Plan ==
In February 2001, Deputy Prime Minister of Serbia and Head of Coordination Center for Southern Serbia Nebojša Čović proposed a plan for resolving the crisis in Preševo Valley. The plan called for joint police forces of local ethnic Albanians and Serbs, in proportion to the ethnic groups' populations in the area. The proposal also called for integrating the valley's ethnic Albanian population into mainstream Serbian political and social life. It also offered civil rights guarantees and promises of economic development. The plan didn’t provide autonomy for the region or possible annexation to Kosovo. Instead, it is provided decentralisation to local authorities. The plan also called for demilitarisation of the Preševo Valley and disbandment of UÇPMB. All rebel controlled areas should be returned to Serbia. Every rebel that surrenders will be promised a pardon from the Yugoslav government. The plan was accepted, and Albanians signed the demilitarization agreement in a village of Končulj.

== Operation Return ==
Operation Return
- Part of Insurgency in the Preševo Valley
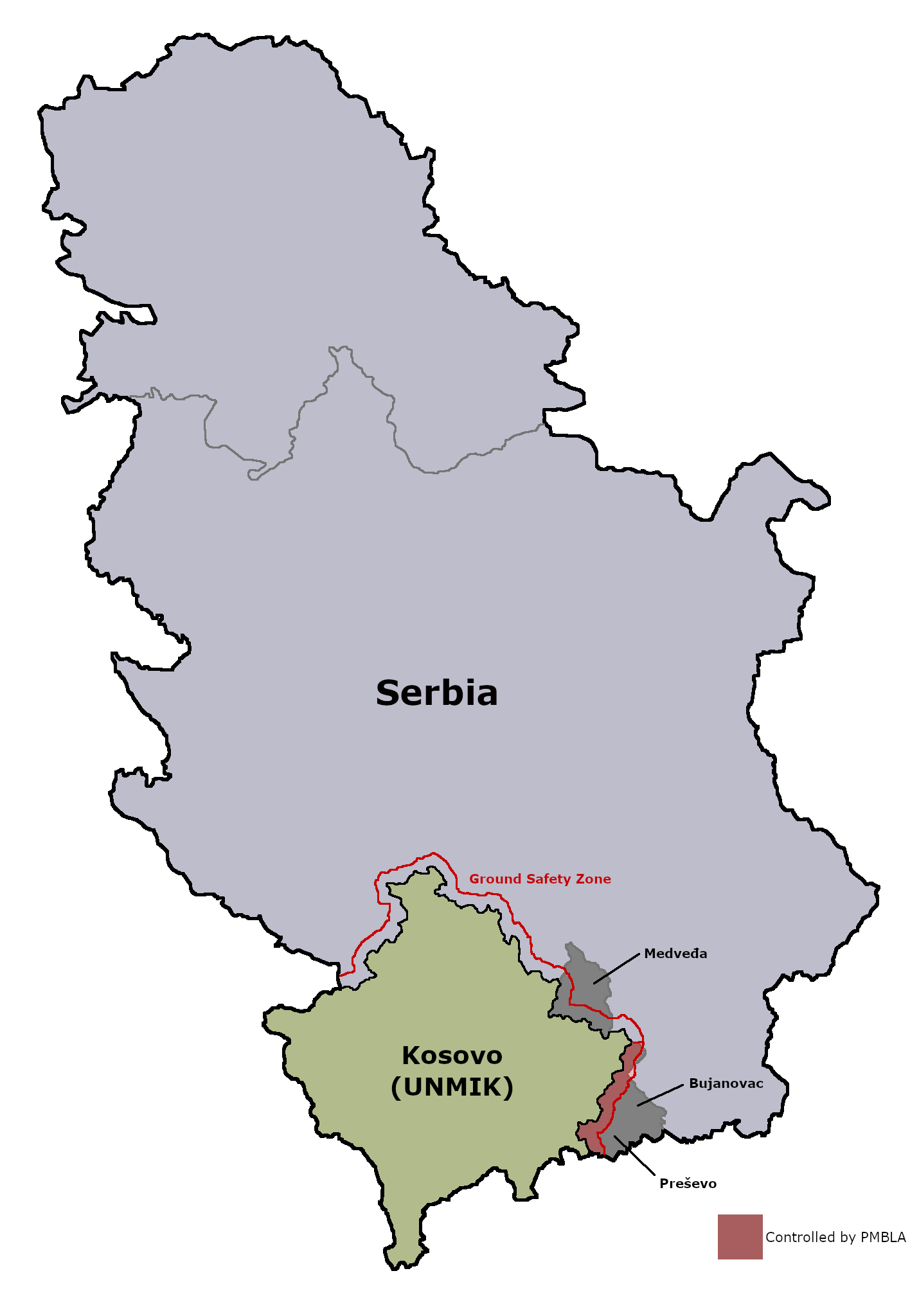
- Serbia UÇPMB Kosovo (KFOR and UNMIK)
Date	24 May–31 May 2001
Location	Ground Safety Zone
Result	Yugoslav victory: Končulj Agreement; Yugoslav troops regain control over villages that where used as strongholds for UÇPMB; UÇPMB militants surrender to Yugoslavia and KFOR; UÇPMB disbanded; Return of sectors A, B, C and D of the valley to Yugoslav control; End of Insurgency in the Preševo Valley
Territorial changes	FR Yugoslavia regains control over the demilitarized Ground Safety Zone (580 km²)

Belligerents
UÇPMB; Albanian National Army	FR Yugoslavia; KFOR

Commanders and leaders
Muhamet Xhemajli (surrendered); Ridvan Qazimi †; Njazi Azemi †; Shaqir Shaqiri (surrendered); Mustafa Shaqiri (surrendered); Bardhyl Osmani †	(Federal Republic of Yugoslavia) Vojislav Koštunica; (Federal Republic of Yugoslavia) Ninoslav Krstić; (Federal Republic of Yugoslavia) Nebojša Pavković; (Federal Republic of Yugoslavia) Goran Radosavljević; (Federal Republic of Yugoslavia) Nebojša Čović; (Federal Republic of Yugoslavia) Milorad Ulemek

Strength
1,600 militants	3,500 personnel 100 members of JSO; 100 members of the SAJ

Casualties and losses
300–350 surrendered Several killed	(Federal Republic of Yugoslavia) One wounded

=== Return of the Yugoslav Army to Sector C – East ===
At 06:30 on 14 March 2001, the return of the Јoint Security Forces to the GSZ, Sector C (East Charlie), from the outer line of this zone, started. The Yugoslav forces were deployed west, from the Preševo-Miratovac line, in three directions: towards the villages of Miratovac, Norča and Trnava. Lieutenant-General Lieutenant-General Ninoslav Krstić was led by Lieutenant-General Lieutenant-Colonel Ninoslav Krstic. The Chief of the General Staff of the VJ, Lieutenant-General Nebojsa Pavković, Commander of the Third Army, Lieutenant General Vladimir Lazarević, Commander of the Priština Corps Major General Radojko Stefanović, General Obrad Stevanović and several other Yugoslav Army officers. The return operation was followed by the President of the FRY Coordination Body for South Serbia Nebojša Čović and members of the Coordination Body Mica Markovic and Milovan Čogurić. Entering sector C, on the triple border of Serbia, Macedonia and Kosovo, it was free of incidents.

Already at 07:20, Nebojša Pavković told FRY President Vojislav Koštunica that the operation is taking place successfully. There were no land mines on the ground, nor did they see armed groups of Albanian rebels. In the sky above Macedonia, several Cobra KFOR helicopters were observed that supervised the operation. In Sector C – East, the first units that entered were engineering units that were tasked with examining the whole field and eliminating the danger of the set mines. Soon, simultaneously with them, other members of the Army entered the zone led by General Pavković and other commanders. When Pavković entered the part of the C sector, Lieutenant Colonel David Olvein, a military attaché of the US Embassy, was watching events with extreme care, but at the same time he was very surprised when he received information that the planned time of 10 hours, ended up taking positions in just 2 hours.

=== Return of the Yugoslav Army C – west and sector A ===
After entering the eastern part of Sector C, on 22 March 2001, the KFOR command led by General Kabigoszu, in a meeting with Yugoslav representatives in Merdare, approved the entry of the Yugoslav Army into the western part of Sector C (along the border of Montenegro and Kosovo) and sector A (to the border line with the municipality of Medveđa). The return to these parts of the GSZ, carried out by the Second Army of the YA, started at 07:00 on 25 March. According to Colonel Radosav Mihailović, the on-site operation, the operation was carried out without incidents and according to the foreseen plan, followed by members of the Coordination Body, KFOR representatives as well as EU observers. This operation restored the state sovereignty of the FRY over the border belt of municipalities: Plav, Berane, Rožaje, Tutin, Novi Pazar, Raška, Brus and Kuršumlija. The total length of the western part of Sector C and Sector A was 263 km, and the width was 5 km; that is, in total, about 1300 km^{2}.

=== Return of the Yugoslav Army to Sector D ===
The preparations of the Yugoslav Army to enter Sector D of the Ground Security Zone (the border region of Medveđa municipality) began after the meeting of General Ninoslav Krstić with the representative of KFOR in Merdare near Kuršumlija on 2 April 2001. The agreement on entry into Sector D was signed in Merdare on 12 April by Ninoslav Krstić and Nebojša Čović, as well as representatives of KFOR. Earlier, Albanian rebels attacked police positions in the village of Marovac, the municipality of Medveđa, with two mortar shells, and attacked members of the local police in Beli Kamen, municipality of Medveđa. It was precisely in these regions that there were representatives of the Coordination Body who were preparing for the occupation of the sector D. After the preparations, Yugoslav forces from the outer circumference of sector D made a move from the starting positions and entry into sector D early in the morning of 14 April.

The operation was monitored by KFOR teams, EU observers and numerous journalists. After a successful operation during which there was no conflict, General Ninoslav Krstić praised the members of Operation Group South and especially praised the members of the battle group of police who occupied the Ravna Banja region – Moravce sector D. The situation in this sector after the entry of the Yugoslav Army was a staple and there were no provocations by Albanian rebels.

=== Return of the Yugoslav Army to Sector B ===
UÇPMB Commander Shefket Musliu, Ridvan Qazimi and Mustafa Shaqiri, signed a demobilization and demilitarization agreement of the UÇPMB on 21 May in Končulj, guaranteeing the safe and peaceful entry of the Yugoslav Army into Sector B of the GSZ according to the following schedule: Zone B South until 22 May, Zone B Center until 31 May, while Zone B North was not under the control of rebels. The agreement was signed in the presence of Sean Sullivan, head of the NATO office for Yugoslavia. On the same day, the commander of the Joint Security Forces, General Ninoslav Krstić, met with the KFOR Commander in Merdare and on that occasion a document on the return of the VJ to Sector B. was signed. To accomplish this task, new special anti-terrorist and anti-trust units of the Joint Security Forces have been engaged.

The action was carried out with the coordination of KFOR and by 23 May, the Army had occupied 90 percent of the B-South and B North zones without encountering any resistance from rebels. The operation was continued to remove mines and seize weapons, ammunition and military equipment. During the occupation of the northern zone of sector B on 24 May, during the exchange of fire between the VJ and the UÇPMB, the rebel commander Ridvan Qazimi, in the area of the Guri Gat Hill (Black Stone) near Veliki Trnovac, was killed. The conflict lasted from 11:30 to 15:00. Qazimi was in custody with three other rebels, and when he got up and went to his jeep, he was hit in the head. It was later revealed that he had been killed by a sniper.

After the death of Qazimi, various stories began to circulate in the south of Serbia, from killing the infected UÇPMB faction members about the distribution of the remaining plunder, to escaping to Kosovo and then to Albania. At the press conference, Nebojša Čović denounced the information that Qazimi was with Sean Sullivan at the time, and he removed doubts about the fate of Ridvan Qazimi, saying he was killed in a confrontation with Serbian security forces. He also praised the way B South and B North were occupied, adding that the Army will not enter Zone B Center, where the highest concentration of rebels is located, until 31 May. The Yugoslav Army performed the last operation during the GSZ's occupation on 31 May, entering the B Center zone. The return of members of the Yugoslav Army to the central part of the sector has been restored sovereignty over this part of the territory of the FRY, and the entire action was completed by 12:00, when the Serbian security forces entered the administrative line with Kosovo. During the operation, there were no conflicts or provocations by rebels or Albanian civilians.

After entering the village of Dobrosin, the centre of the rebels, police carried out an inspection of 14 abandoned accommodation facilities. In the presence of the President of the Local Community Dobrosin, Reshat Salihi, they found 2 anti-personnel mines, uniforms and military equipment, three radio stations, 100 medical items and others. During the deployment of the Yugoslav Army along the left border of the central part of Sector B, at the Visoko Bilo, sergeant Bratislav Milinković (1957), a member of the 63rd Parachute Brigade from Niš, aimed at a counter-attack mine and received a severe injury to his left leg. He was taken to the military hospital in Bujanovac and then transferred to further treatment in Niš. With the entry of the Joint Security Forces in the Zone B Center, Operation Return was completed and control over the entire Ground Safety Zone was restored, ending the conflicts in southern Serbia.

== Battle of Oraovica ==
Oraovica battle during Insurgency in Southern Serbia

The Battle of Oraovica was a conflict between Army and Police of FR Yugoslavia and Albanian militant group before Serbs entered last sector of Ground Security Zone. Since the village was outside the GSZ, Yugoslav forces were allowed to use heavier weapons, such as M-84 tanks. On 14 May, Yugoslav forces launched an attack on UÇPMB stronghold in this Albanian-populated place near the border with Kosovo.

Fighting began on 14 May at 06:10 by an attack on Yugoslav forces. At 07:00 guerrillas attacked Serbian police and army again and fired three rocket towards the village. More incidents happened during the day until 20:00. On 15 May Serbian forces captured Oraovica although UÇPMB attacked them at 14:15.

Debates were high on how many casualties there were. Yugoslav troops sustained no casualties. While the UÇPMB had 2 casualties. Yugoslavia claims that 14-20 were killed, 8 wounded and that 80 were captured.

== Končulj Agreement ==
The Demilitarization Statement, or the Končulj Agreement, was a ceasefire signed between the FR Yugoslavia and the UÇPMB on 20 May 2001. The Končulj Agreement was the first agreement related to this part of Serbia (Preševo, Medveđa, and Bujanovac). The agreement ended the conflicts that spilled over from Kosovo, with political representatives from the local Albanians, Serbia and Kosovo committing to demilitarization.

It sought for the full demilitarization, demobilization and disarmament of the Liberation Army of Preševo, Medveđa and Bujanovac (UÇPMB). It also calls for integration of ethnic Albanians into governmental, civic, economic and police structures, and support from the international community to implement the so-called Čović Plan. The agreement was signed by Serbian president Vojislav Koštunica and Shefket Musliu, the highest UÇPMB commander who surrendered.

According to the agreement, Yugoslav troops were allowed safe access to Sector B of Preševo. NATO representative Sean Sullivan witnessed the agreement as a broker of the talks in absence of direct communication between the UÇPMB and the FRY government. "It's time to use other means than weapons," says Shefket Musliu, the highest commander of one of fractions of the UÇPMB, as he signed the Končulj agreement to lay down his arms. At the same time, the Serbian side agreed to sign the Statement on conditional amnesty for members of the UÇPMB, which promised amnesty to UÇPMB members from 23 May 2001.

== Aftermath ==
About 400 UÇPMB fighters surrendered to KFOR and another 150 to Serbian police. They were not charged for war crimes according to the Čović Plan and Končulj Agreement. Most of the UÇPMB members joined the Albanian National Army (ANA) and the National Liberation Army's war in Macedonia, while others joined newly formed Liberation Army of Eastern Kosovo. Because of its lack of members, the LAEK is not active. Several attacks on the Serb forces and civilians were recorded after the end of the war.

After the reoccupation of GSZ, Serbia separated it into 3 sectors. Sector B streches from Medveđa to the border with Republic of Macedonia and is controlled by 4th Land Force Brigade situated in the city of Vranje. There are about eleven bases in this area. In 2009, the largest military base in Serbia, Cepotina, was opened 5 km from Bujanovac.

In 2002, Preševo, Medveđa and Bujanovac had 57,595 ethnic Albanians. However, they boycotted the 2011 census, so only 6,000 people were recorded. It is estimated that Preševo Valley today has around 50,000 ethnic Albanians. Since 2002, there have been low intensity skirmishes and illegal logging incidences in the Preševo valley since the end of the conflict, resulting in many casualties.

=== Casualties and displacement ===
During the conflict, 18 members of the Yugoslav security forces were killed and 68 were wounded. Eight ethnic Serb civilians were also killed. Some of the deaths were caused by mines. Serbia has alleged that several Serbs were tortured and killed in detention camps. In 2013, UÇPMB veterans erected a memorial with the names of 27 insurgents who were killed in the conflict. Seven ethnic Albanian civilians were also killed. Two United Nations observers were wounded, according to reports.

=== 2002–2004 violence ===
Crisis in the Preševo Valley
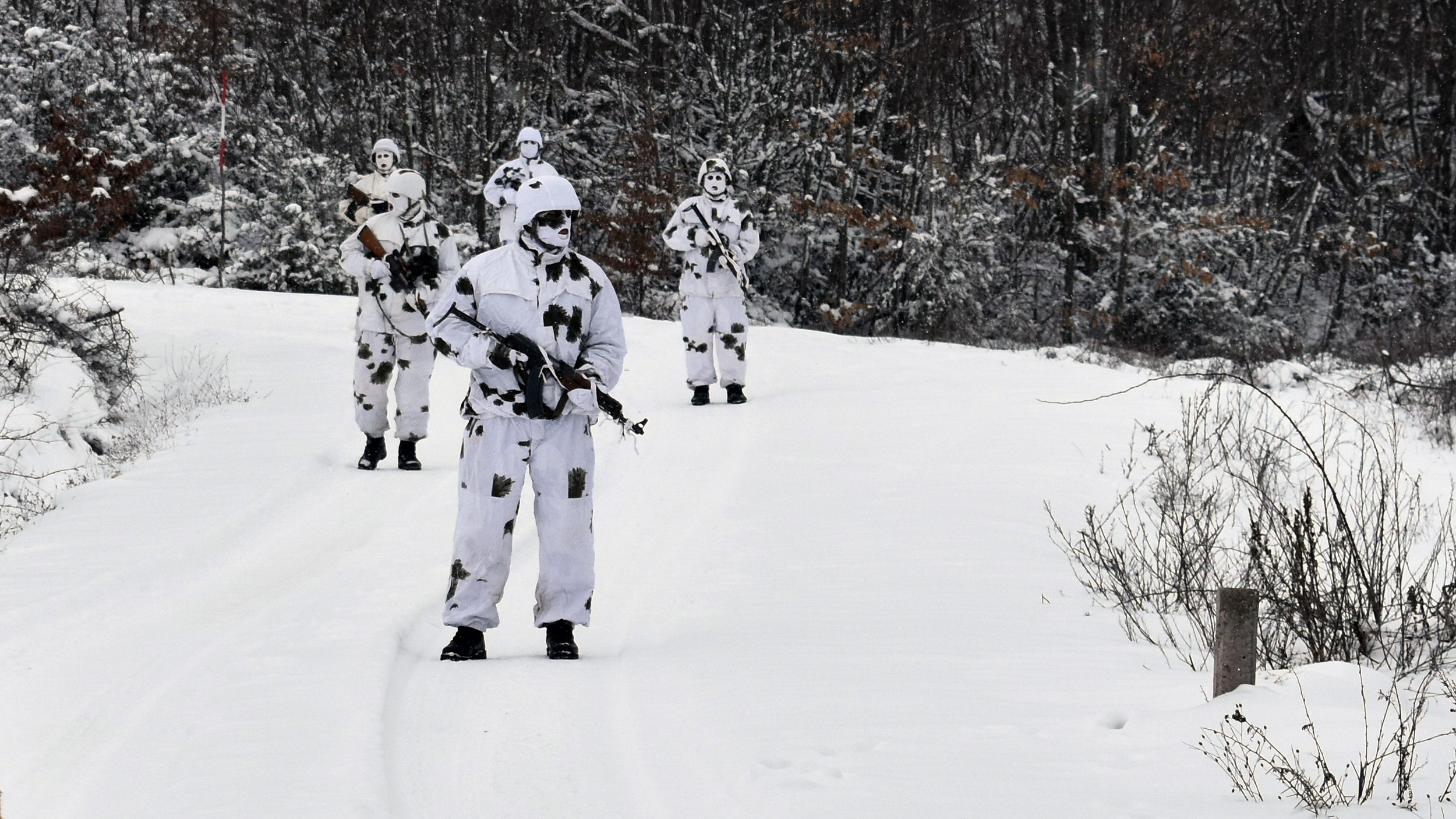
- Serbian Army units training for deployment to the Ground Safety Zone
Date	2002–2013
Location	Preševo Valley, Serbia
Status	Serbian victory: Low intensity conflict continues; Many attacks on police and Gendarmery; Monument crisis in 2013; Illegal logging incidents

Belligerents
Former UÇPMB members Albanian National Army; Different armed groups	(Serbia and Montenegro) FR Yugoslavia (2002–2006); Serbia (2006–2013)

Casualties and losses
Several killed	at least 6 killed
- 7 civilians killed

Low-intensity clashes continued over the next years. Below is the chronology of important events:

==== 2002 ====
- 20 May – bomb thrown on a house of an ethnic Albanian in Preševo. Police said it was the fifteenth registered attack since March.
- December – police patrol was attacked in Končulj

==== 2003 ====
- 26 and 28 January – police patrol attacked again in Končulj
- 4 February – bomb thrown on a Serb house in Levosoje
- 23 February – one Gendarmery member killed, two wounded in Muhovac by anti-tank mine
- 2 March – anti-tank mine found in Turija
- 10–11 August – attacks on a police with a mortar in Dobrosin
- 12 August – road Kuršumlija – Podujevo, police attacked
- 13 August – mine placed in Lučane
- 23 August – grenade thrown
- 27 August – police attacked in Dobrosin
- 12 September – police attacked in Depce, Rudnik, Madjare and Preševo
- 23 September – bomb found in a school in Bujanovac
- 24 September – police attacked in Dobrosin

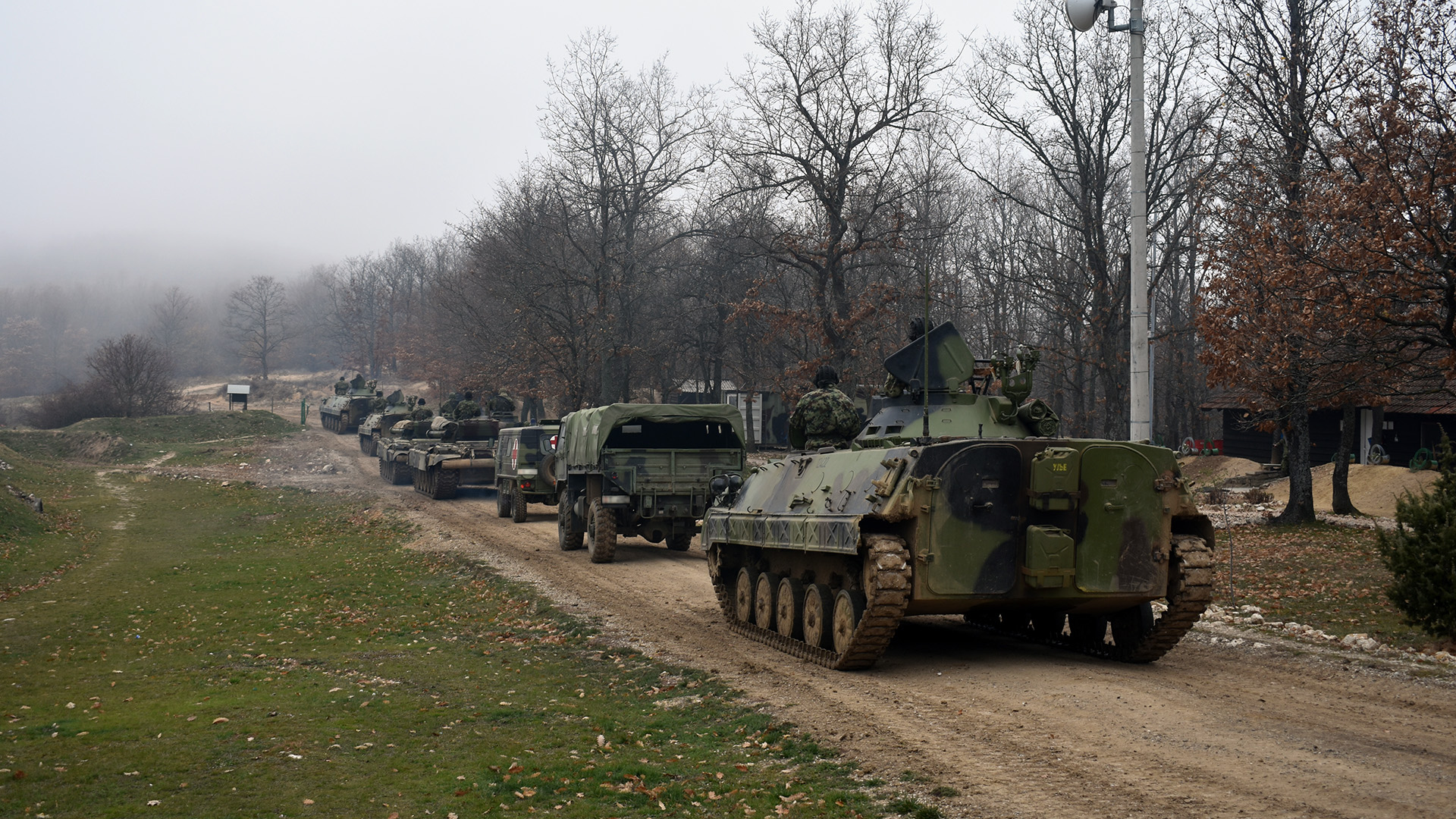
Serbian Army in Ground Safety Zone after an exercise in April 2022

==== 2004 ====
- 4 February– Security Intelligence Agency member Selver Fazlliju killed in Bujanovac
- March – bomb found in school in Preševo

Several attacks on army were recorded in this period, such as attacks on a watchtower in Čarska kula, sabotages on a pillar through which is powered the base of near Dobrosin, and the stoning of a military motor vehicle in the village of Lučane.

=== 2009 attacks ===
On 9 July 2009, two members of the Gendarmery were wounded after unnamed 'terrorists' launched a grenade at their Land Rover near the village of Lučane. Another vehicle in the same patrol and nearby houses were also damaged. On 14 July, a bomb exploded near the entrance of a building in Preševo where ethnic Albanian member of the Gendarmery lived with his family. His wife and son were injured. Minister of Internal Affairs Ivica Dačić described this attacks as a terrorist act. The same night, police conducted an operation on a border with Kosovo, cutting illegal arms smuggling to central Serbia. Dačić also said they found large amounts of weapons and ammunition in village Norča near Preševo. The Government of Serbia accused former UÇPMB high-ranking member Lirim Jakupi, known as "Commander Nazi". He was also wanted by Macedonia for attacks on police in 2005.

=== 2012–2013 monument crisis ===
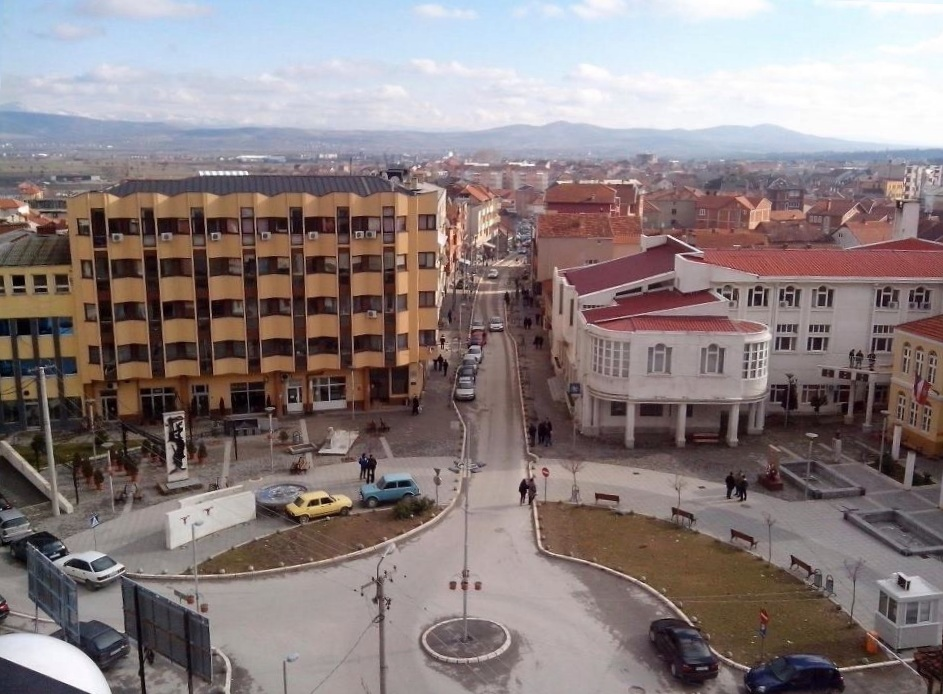
Center of Preševo in 2013

In November 2012, a monument dedicated to the 27 killed UÇPMB fighters was erected in Preševo's main square. The Government of Serbia was against it, and therefore, enforced an ultimatum to the local government to remove it. On 16 May the deadline expired. On 20 May, the Serbian Gendarmery surrounded the city with 200 men, backed up by heavily armoured vehicles and bulldozers, started removing the monument with a bagger at 7:00 AM. At least 2,000 ethnic Albanians protested in Preševo to protest against the removal. The operation was led by general Bratislav Dikić. This crisis raised the tension in the Preševo Valley once again.

=== 2014 attack on the Gendarmery ===
On 25 January 2014, a Norwegian citizen suspected to be a Wahhabi member attacked the Gendarmery in Preševo. He was killed in a crossfire with the police, and his motive was unknown.

=== Illegal logging ===
During the last years, numerous incidents of illegal logging have been registered in the former GSZ, reportedly involving armed groups from the territory kd Kosovo. One incident occurred during August 2021, when a patrol of the Serbian Army in the area called Ugljarski krš spotted a group of 12 people illegally cutting down the forest. Upon the arrival of the military patrol, the thieves fired a bullet into the air. The patrol fired a warning shot and headed towards the group.

The forest thieves then ran away in the direction of the Kosovo side of the administrative line, but two more bursts were heard in the immediate vicinity. There were no injuries in the incident, but, as announced by the Ministry of Defence, the Serbian Army was put on high alert in that area.

Attacks by forest thieves on army and police patrols in the administrative zone of the Kuršumlija municipality especially intensify at the end of summer and the beginning of autumn, when Albanians from Kosovo illegally cut down the forest in this area. To steal the forest, as the residents of the sparsely populated Kuršumlija villages in this area point out, forest thieves usually come armed. During 2021 alone, 56 occurrences of illegal logging have been recorded by Serbian authorities.

== Reactions ==
- Albania – Prime Minister Ilir Meta said that the problem in the Preševo Valley should be solved through "dialogue and democratic means" and not violence. The dialogue should begin soon so that the Albanians are assured internationally recognized standards of human rights. Albanian political leaders have called for expansion of the NATO buffer zone and an internationally supervised demilitarization of the valley, essentially extending Kosovo's protected status to southern Serbia. The Albanian government has condemned the violence and appealed to Kosovo's Albanian political leaders to distance themselves.
- Federal Republic of Yugoslavia – The Yugoslav president, Vojislav Koštunica, warned that fresh fighting would erupt if KFOR units did not act to prevent the attacks coming from the UÇPMB.
- Albanian politicians in Serbia – Jonuz Musliu, head of the Political Council for Preševo, said that they are against armed confrontation with the Serbian government.
- Kosovo Liberation Army – Hashim Thaçi accused Belgrade of genocide against the ethnic Albanian majority in three Serbian towns.
- ICTY – Chief Prosecutor Carla Del Ponte announced the investigation on activities of the UÇPMB in Preševo Valley.
- NATO – NATO allowed Serb forces to enter G. NATO spokesman Jamie Shea said the alliance had spoken to leaders of the ethnic Albanian community in Kosovo about the situation, and warned them it would not tolerate any action that made it worse. Secretary General of NATO George Robertson denounced ethnic Albanian insurgents operating in the five-kilometre wide Ground Safety Zone along southern Serbia's boundary with Kosovo. Robertson described the UÇPMB as "a handful of extremists who are trying to seek an over-action", but said they won't get far.
- Russia – Russian Foreign Minister, Igor Ivanov, described the situation in the area as very critical; he said urgent steps were needed to stop the violence from spreading.
- United Nations – UN secretary general Kofi Annan stated: "It is clear that it is the Albanians who are now the cause of these provocations". United Nations Security Council condemned Albanian extremist violence in Southern Serbia. The Security Council called ethnic Albanian extremists from Kosovo to withdraw immediately from the boundary zone.
- United States – The United States was against the possible secession of Preševo Valley. US officials also warned the rebels that there would be no repeat of NATO's intervention in Kosovo. Secretary of State Madeleine Albright said it was very important that extremists from both sides not be allowed to disrupt the situation further.

== See also ==
- 2000 unrest in Kosovo
- 2004 unrest in Kosovo
- Kosovo independence precedent
- List of conflicts involving Albanian rebel groups in the post-Cold War era
- Timeline of the insurgency in the Preševo Valley
