= Ridvan Qazimi =

Albanian Guerrilla commander

- Born: 4 April 1964; Bujanovac, SR Serbia, SFR Yugoslavia
- Died: 24 May 2001 (aged 37); Veliki Trnovac, Serbia, FR Yugoslavia
- Children: 4
- Military career
- Allegiance: Croatia; Republic of Bosnia and Herzegovina; Kosovo Liberation Army; Liberation Army of Preševo, Medveđa and Bujanovac
- Service years: 1991–2001
- Rank: Commander
- Nicknames: "Lleshi" "Commander Lleshi"
- Unit: 112th Brigade
- Conflicts: Croatian War of Independence; Bosnian War; Kosovo War; Insurgency in the Preševo Valley; Battle of Tërnoc i Madh †

Ridvan Qazimi (4 April 1964 – 24 May 2001) was one of the early commanders and founders of the Liberation Army of Preševo, Medveđa and Bujanovac (UÇPMB). During the war, he was known by his nom de guerre as Kommandant Lleshi. During the 1999–2001 insurgency in the Preševo Valley, he was the third-highest ranked commander of the UÇPMB and commanded the 112th Brigade.

== Biography ==
Qazimi was born on 4 April 1964 in Bujanovac. He graduated from the mechanical engineering school in Pristina, but he worked as a tailor and was the owner of a boutique in Bujanovac. He took part in the Croatian War of Independence and the Bosnian War fighting against Serbian forces. Qazimi also fought for the Kosovo Liberation Army (KLA) during the Kosovo War, where he was under the command of Adem Jashari.

=== Insurgency in the Preševo Valley ===
Along with Shefket Musliu, Muhamet Xhemajli and Mustafa Shaqiri, he founded and commanded the UÇPMB which began training in the Ground Safety Zone (GSZ). The group began attacking Serbian civilians and police, with the goal of joining Preševo, Medveđa and Bujanovac into Kosovo, which escalated into an insurgency.

Qazimi was the head of the negotiating delegation of the UÇPMB in all peace talks, and was one of the commanders who advocated for negotiations and peaceful ways of solving problematic situations.

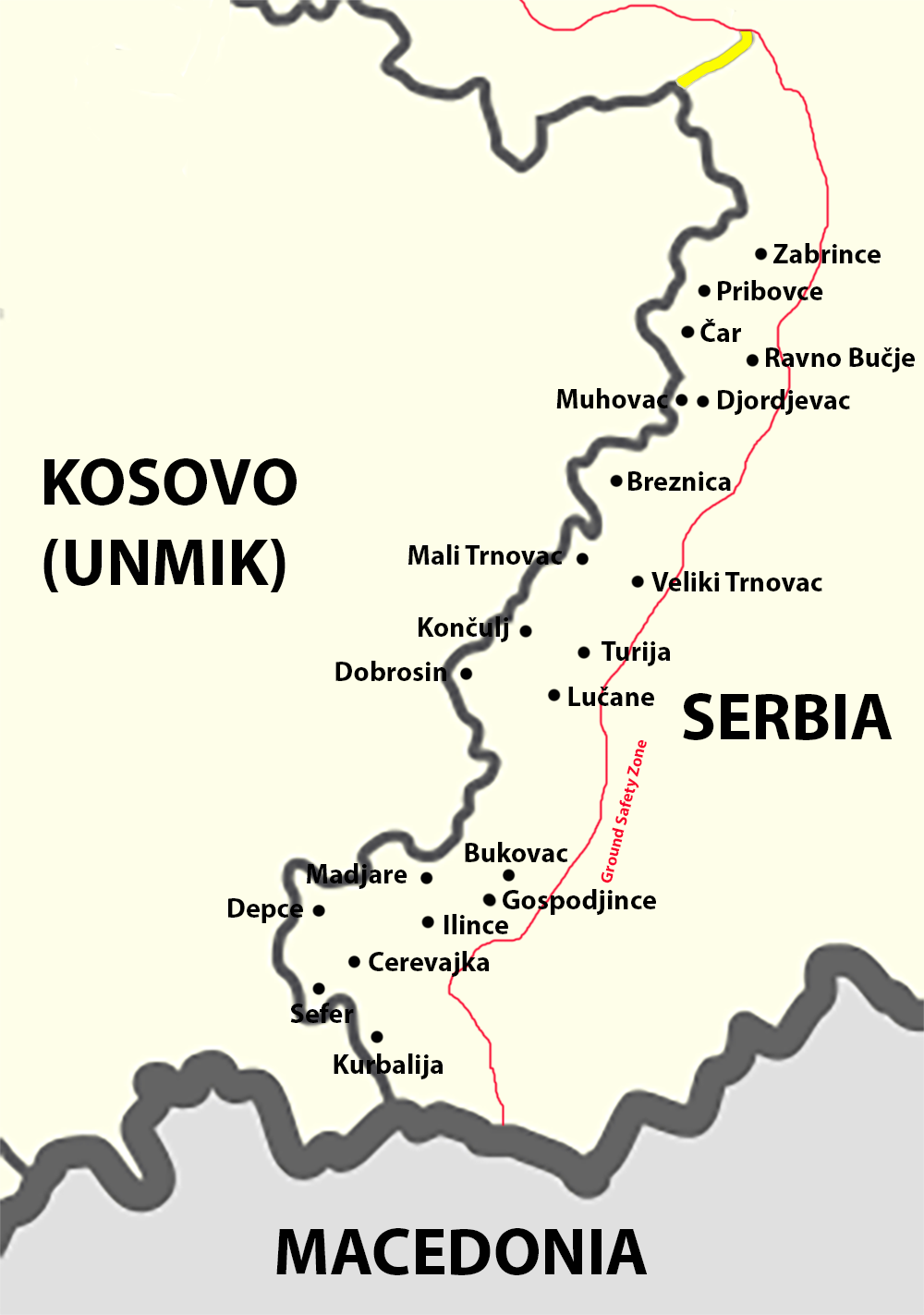
Villages under the control of UÇPMB in 2000

Qazimi was known among his soldiers as Commander Lleshi, and was in charge of the UÇPMB Center zone. It included the villages of Veliki Trnovac Breznica, Mali Trnovac, Dobrosin, Končulj, Lučane, Turija. The command of his sector was in the village of Veliki Trnovac, in which he commanded the 112th Brigade with around 600 to 700 soldiers that carried out the most attacks during the insurgency.

Towards the end of the insurgency, he announced that he would be the last to lay down his weapons, but that he would still lay it down. He then warned that the UÇPMB would fiercely respond to any provocation by Yugoslav Army (VJ) when entering the GSZ, an area that previously VJ units were prohibited from entering after the Kumanovo Agreement.

== Death ==
As part of an agreement by NATO, the VJ were allowed to enter the GSZ via Operation Return. On 21 May 2001, UÇPMB commanders Shefket Musliu, Muhamet Xhemajli, Qazimi and Mustafa Shaqiri signed the Končulj Agreement which resulted in the full demilitarization, demobilization, and disarmament of the UÇPMB. According to the agreement, the VJ was to enter the rest of the GSZ by 31 May 2001. At the same time, the Serbian side agreed to sign the Statement on conditional amnesty for members of the UÇPMB, which promised amnesty to UÇPMB members from 23 May 2001.

Qazimi was killed only a day later on 24 May 2001 during a battle between the UÇPMB and the VJ near Veliki Trnovac, which lasted from 11:30 a.m. to 3:00 p.m. It was later found out that he was killed by a sniper. Journalists were told that day in the Press Center of the Coordination Body for the municipalities of Bujanovac, Preševo and Medveđa that it was indeed an accident, and that Qazimi and other members of UÇPMB were shot because, according to an earlier agreement, they were not supposed to be there while the VJ were entering the GSZ. The then president of the Southern Serbia Coordination Center, Nebojsa Čović, expressed regret over this event, which he repeated several times later.

== Legacy ==
After the conflict, at the entrance to Veliki Trnovac, local Albanians erected a monument to him in 2002. He is highly respected by Albanians in southern Serbia, and a four-day manifestation, called "Commander Lleshi's Days", is held in his honor every year. Qazimi has a museum, located in Veliki Trnovac. It was opened on 26 November 2012, and was built by local Albanians with the help of the Albanian diaspora. It exhibits Qazimi's personal belongings, such as photographs, his uniform and his weapons, as well as the jeep in which he was killed.
