= Timeline of the insurgency in the Preševo Valley =

Battle of Susaja

Abbreviations:

Combatants

- UÇPMB-Liberation Army of Preševo, Medveđa and Bujanovac.
- VJ-Yugoslav Army
- NATO-North Atlantic treaty organization
- KFOR-Kosovo Force (NATO)

== Insurgency ==
=== 1999 ===
- June: Due to the FRY's inability to use any heavy weapons against the UÇPMB, the group expanded and occupied all villages related to Sectors B and C east.
- 21 November: 2 Serbian police officers are killed by a land mine placed by UÇPMB.
- 21 November: Attack at Prepolac. ANA victory. 3 officers killed after an attack on a police checkpoint.

=== 2000 ===
- 16 January: Pasjane Killings. 3 Serbian civilians killed by UÇPMB.
- 4 March: Battle of Dobrosin. UÇPMB victory. UÇPMB capture Dobrosin.
- July – 27 November: Clashes around Bujanovac. UÇPMB victory. UÇPMB captures all villages near Bujanovac besides Lučane. KFOR blocks the roads to Dobrosin stopping further conflicts in the area.
- 21–27 November: Attacks near Dobrosin. UÇPMB victory. Serbian forces withdraw from the Ground Safety Zone. 7 Serbian troops killed.
- 21 November: First Battle of Lučane. UÇPMB victory. 7 Yugoslav troops killed and 5 injured. UÇPMB captures Lučane.
- November: 4 Serbian soldiers killed and many more injured during fighting with UÇPMB.
- 25 December: Skirmish on Saint Ilija Mountain. MUP victory. MUP capture UÇPMB stronghold in Saint Ilija Mountain.
- 30–31 December: 6 Serbian civilians are kidnapped on the Gjilan-Preševo road. Later released.

=== 2001 ===
- 24–28 January Battle of Šušaja. UÇPMB victory. UÇPMB captures Šušaja.
- 14 March: Start of Operation Return (2001).
- 13–14 May: Battle of Oraovica. Serbian victory. Serbian troops recapture Oraovica.
- 24 May: UÇPMB commander Ridvan Qazimi killed in a clash against Serbian forces near the Guri Gat mountain above Bujanovac.
- 1 June: End of Operation Return (2001). Serbian victory. Končulj agreement. Serbian forces capture the GSZ and UÇPMB is disbanded.

== Aftermath ==
2001

- August 3rd: Albanian gunman kills 2 Serbian police officers and injures 2 others.The gunman was never caught, but the Albanian National Army claimed responsibility over the incident.
