= List of conflicts involving Albanian rebel groups in the post–Cold War era =

The following is a list of conflicts involving Albanian rebel groups in the post–Cold War era.

The list gives the name, the date, combatants, and the result of these conflicts following this legend:

Rebel victory
Rebel defeat
Another result
Ongoing conflict

== List ==
Conflict	Combatant 1	Combatant 2	Location	Result	Casualties
Siege of Prekaz (1991)	(Republic of Kosova) Jashari family	(Socialist Federal Republic of Yugoslavia) FR Yugoslavia	Kosovo	Victory: Prekaz declared a no-go area by Serb authorities	3 wounded
Insurgency in Kosovo (1995–1998)	Kosovo Liberation Army (KLA)	FR Yugoslavia	Kosovo	Start of Kosovo War	121 Serb policemen
1997 Albanian civil war	Rebels: Armed civilians who lost their properties; Armed gangs; Albanian army defectors; Salvation Committees; Monarchists	Government: Democratic Party; SHIK; Part of the Albanian police; Republican Guard; (United Nations) UNSC missions: Austria; France; Germany; Greece; Italy; Romania; Spain; Turkey; United States	Albania	Rebel victory: New parliamentary elections; Fatos Nano and the Socialist Party of Albania win the parliamentary election; The entirety of Albania except Tirana falls under Rebel control and later anarchy; End of Sali Berisha‘s presidency	2000 civilians, soldiers, police and secret police officers
Kosovo War (1998–1999)	Kosovo Liberation Army NATO: Belgium; Canada; Denmark; France; Germany; Italy; Netherlands; Norway; Portugal; Spain; Turkey; United Kingdom; United States	FR Yugoslavia	Kosovo	Kumanovo Agreement: Yugoslavia de-facto losses control over Kosovo but Resolution 1244 confirms it’s territorial integrity; Start of armed insurgency in Preševo valley	c. 13,548 fighters and civilians of all ethnicities dead killed
Insurgency in the Preševo Valley (1999–2001)	Liberation Army of Preševo, Medveđa and Bujanovac (UÇPMB)	FR Yugoslavia	Ground Safety Zone	Yugoslav victory: Končulj Agreement; Rebels surrendered, demilitarized and demobilized; Yugoslavia retakes the Ground Safety Zone	60 fighters and civilians killed from both sides
2001 insurgency in Macedonia	National Liberation Army (NLA) Albanian National Army (ANA)	Macedonia	Polog and Kumanovo regions	Ohrid Agreement: Peace was brokered between NLA and Macedonia; Albanian was recognized as an official language besides Macedonian; Albanians received greater rights	150–250 total dead and 1,000 total casualties
Crisis in the Preševo Valley (2002–2013)	Different armed groups Albanian National Army; Former UÇPMB members	FR Yugoslavia (2002–2006) Serbia (2006–2013)	Preševo Valley	Serbian victory: Low-intensity clashes; Many attacks on police and Gendarmery; Monument crisis in 2013; Illegal logging incidents	Several killed on both sides and 7 Serb civilians killed

== See also ==
- List of wars involving Albania
