= Končulj Agreement =

Accords concluded on 2001 about the Insurgency in the Preševo Valley

Basic UÇPMB statement signed about the Insurgency in the Preševo Valley
- Type: Ceasefire
- Signed: 20 May 2001
- Location: Končulj, Serbia, FR Yugoslavia
- Signatories: Shefket Musliu; Mustafa Shaqiri; Ridvan Qazimi "Lleshi"; Muhamet Xhemajli
- Parties: UÇPMB Witnessed by: NATO
- Language: English

Statement on conditional amnesty for members of the UÇPMB
- Type: Ceasefire
- Signed: 23 May 2001
- Signatories: Nebojša Čović; Ninoslav Krstić; Goran Radosavljević
- Language: Serbian

The Končulj Agreement is a colloquial name for two statements, the Basic UÇPMB statement signed about the Insurgency in the Preševo Valley, signed by the Liberation Army of Preševo, Medveđa and Bujanovac (UÇPMB) and the Statement on conditional amnesty for members of the UÇPMB, signed by the Republic of Serbia within FR Yugoslavia in 2001. The Končulj Agreement is the first agreement related to Preševo, Medveđa, and Bujanovac.

It resulted in the full demilitarization, demobilization, and disarmament of the Liberation Army of Presevo, Medveda, and Bujanovac. It also calls for integration of ethnic Albanians into governmental, civic, economic, and police structures, and support from the international community to implement the so-called Čović Plan.

The agreement ended the conflicts that spilled over from Kosovo, with political representatives from the local Albanians, Serbia, and Kosovo committing to demilitarization and demobilization of the UÇPMB. The agreement was witnessed by Sean Sullivan, who was the NATO Head of Office in the FRY. According to that agreement, the Yugoslav Army was to enter Sector B of the Ground Safety Zone (GSZ) by 31 May 2001.

== Background ==
On June 12, 1999, one day after the signing of the Kumanovo Agreement, the Liberation Army of Preševo, Medveđa and Bujanovac (UÇPMB) was founded by Shefket Musliu, an auto mechanic from Končulj, who was the highest commander in the UÇPMB. The group began attacking Serbian civilians and police, with the goal of joining Preševo, Medveđa and Bujanovac into Kosovo, which escalated into an insurgency.

Due to the FRY's inability to use any heavy weapons in the Ground Safety Zone (GSZ) and against the UÇPMB, the group expanded and occupied all villages related to Sectors B and C east, with the exception of Gramada. They divided the sectors into three zones; North zone, Center zone, and South zone.

The Yugoslav Army tried to take back some Serbian-held areas in Mid-November 2000, but they had to retreat following the kidnapping and killings of four policemen and two wounded policemen in the demilitarized zone, allowing the UÇPMB to take one many cities previously held by the FRY.

After the overthrow of Slobodan Milošević on 5 October 2000, Vojislav Koštunica wanted the United States to reduce or disband the GSZ, with KFOR mediating a ceasefire on 24 November 2000.

Earlier in March 2001, NATO allowed Yugoslav forces to take back the GSZ sector by sector in an attempt to decrease the amount of fierce fighting between the UÇPMB and Yugoslav troops. From 23 May 2001, some 400 UÇPMB forces surrendered to KFOR in an attempt to get amnesty from the FRY. The insurgency continued until 1 June 2001 when it officially ended.

== Provisions ==
The key provisions of the agreement were designed to do the following:

- The full demilitarization, demobilization, and disarmament of the Liberation Army of Preševo, Medveđa, and Bujanovac (UÇPMB).
- Integration of ethnic Albanians into governmental, civic, economic and police structures, and support from the international community to implement the so-called Čovic Plan.
- Stop the fighting in Preševo, Medveđa, and Bujanovac.

At the same time, the Serbian side agreed to sign the Statement on conditional amnesty for members of the UÇPMB, which promised amnesty to UÇPMB members from 23 May 2001.
