= Battle of Oraovica =

2001 battle

- Part of the Insurgency in the Preševo Valley
Date	13–14 May 2001
Location	Oraovica, Karadak, Serbia, Federal Republic of Yugoslavia 42°19′18″N 21°39′21″E
Result	Yugoslav victory
Territorial changes	Yugoslav forces regain control over Oraovica

Belligerents
Federal Republic of Yugoslavia	Liberation Army of Preševo, Medveđa and Bujanovac

Commanders and leaders
(Federal Republic of Yugoslavia) Ninoslav Krstić (Federal Republic of Yugoslavia) Goran Radosavljević	Bardhyl Osmani †; Sami Ukshini †; Shaban Ukshini †; Mustafa Shaqiri (WIA)

Units involved
(Federal Republic of Yugoslavia) 211th Armored Brigade (Federal Republic of Yugoslavia) 78th Motorized Brigade; 63rd Parachute Brigade; 72nd Brigade for Special Operations; Police of Serbia	111th Brigade; 113th Brigade; 115th Brigade

Casualties and losses
(Federal Republic of Yugoslavia) None	UÇPMB claim: 2 killed 8 wounded Yugoslav claim: 14–20 killed 80 POWs
- (Albania) 900 Albanian locals displaced

The Battle of Oraovica (Serbian: Bitka na Oraovica) was a conflict between the army and police of the Federal Republic of Yugoslavia and the Albanian militant group Liberation Army of Preševo, Medveđa and Bujanovac (UÇPMB) during the 1999–2001 insurgency in the Preševo Valley.

== Background ==
After the end of the Kosovo War in 1999 with the signing of the Kumanovo agreement, a 5-kilometre-wide Ground Safety Zone (GSZ) was created. It served as a buffer zone between the Yugoslav Army and the Kosovo Force (KFOR). In June 1999, a new Albanian militant insurgent group was formed under the UÇPMB, which started training in the GSZ. The group began attacking Serbian civilians and police, which escalated into an insurgency.

== Battle ==
The village of Oraovica was under the control of UÇPMB. On 14 May Yugoslav forces launched an attack on the UÇPMB stronghold in this Albanian-populated place near the border with Kosovo. Fighting began on 13 May at 6:10 a.m by an attack on Yugoslav forces. At 7:00 a.m, Albanian men attacked Serbian police and army again and fired three rockets towards the village. More incidents happened during the day until 8:00 p.m. On 14 May, Serbian forces captured Oraovica after the UÇPMB attacked them at 2:15 p.m.
