= Končulj =

Končulj Кончуљ Konçul
- Village
- Location within Serbia
- Coordinates: 42.4744°N 21.6878°E
- Country: Serbia
- District: Pčinja District
- Municipality: Bujanovac

Area
  - Total: 13.86 km^{2} (5.35 sq mi)
- Elevation: 520 m (1,710 ft)

Population (2002)
  - Total: 1,306
  - Density: 94.23/km^{2} (244.0/sq mi)
- Time zone: UTC+1 (CET)
  - Summer (DST): UTC+2 (CEST)

Končulj (Serbian Cyrillic: Кончуљ; Albanian: Konçul) is a village located in the municipality of Bujanovac, Serbia. According to the 2002 census, the village has a population of 1,306 people, entirely composed of ethnic Albanians. There is administrative border crossing between central Serbia and Kosovo near Končulj.

== Preševo Valley Insurgency ==
During the Insurgency in the Preševo Valley, the Liberation Army of Preševo, Medveđa and Bujanovac (UÇPMB) was founded in Dobrosin by Shefket Musliu, an auto mechanic and highest commander of the UÇPMB. The group began attacking Serbian civilians and police, with the goal of joining Preševo, Medveđa and Bujanovac into Kosovo, which escalated into an insurgency.

Earlier in March 2001, NATO allowed Yugoslav forces to take back the Ground Safety Zone (GSZ) sector by sector in an attempt to decrease the amount of fierce fighting between the UÇPMB and Yugoslav troops. In early 2001, a UÇPMB fighter died in an accidental explosion at a weapons depot.

=== Končulj agreement ===
On 21 May, 2001, the Končulj agreement was signed between Shefket Musliu, Mustafa Shaqiri, Ridvan Qazimi, and Muhamet Xhemajli. The agreement was witnessed by Sean Sullivan, who was the NATO Head of Office in the Federal Republic of Yugoslavia (FRY). At the same time, the Serbian side agreed to sign the Statement on conditional amnesty for members of the UÇPMB, which promised amnesty to UÇPMB members from 23 May 2001. The insurgency continued until 1 June 2001 when it officially ended.
