= Veliki Trnovac =

Veliki Trnovac Tërnoc i Madh Велики Трновац
- Village
- Велики Трновац
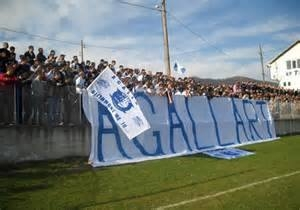
- KF Tërnoci football match in Veliki Trnovac

- Location within Serbia
- Coordinates: 42°28′N 21°44′E
- Country: Serbia
- District: Pčinja District
- Municipality: Bujanovac
- Elevation: 1,099 ft (335 m)

Population (2022)
  - Total: 11,762
- Time zone: UTC+1 (CET)
  - Summer (DST): UTC+2 (CEST)
- Postal code: 17528
- Area code: 0038117

Veliki Trnovac (Serbian Cyrillic: Велики Трновац; Albanian: Tërnoc i Madh) is a village in the municipality of Bujanovac, Serbia. According to the 2022 census, the village had a population of 11,762. Of these, 11,730 (99,52%) were ethnic Albanians, 1 (0,01%) Bulgarian, 1 (0,01%) Bosniak, and 12 (0,17%) others. The village is home to the football club KF Tërnoci.

== History ==
Veliki Trnovac is considered one of the oldest settlements in the Vranje Basin. In the year 1400, Despot Uglješa donated it to the Monastery of Hilandar. Earlier, Veliki Trnovac was a Serbian Christian settlement. Muslim Albanians, who began settling there from the second half of the 18th century onward, expelled the Serbian population.

Present-day Albanians state that nine Serbian families were displaced to Bujanovac. The overall number of expelled Serbs was much larger, although the exact figure cannot be reliably determined. By 1912, Veliki Trnovac was recorded as a Muslim Albanian village. It also contained a small number of Muslim Roma inhabitants.

In the upper part of Veliki Trnovac, the ruins of an old church remained visible until 1935. Around it were old Serbian graves. After the departure of the Serbs, the Albanians destroyed the visible traces of the church and cemetery. In that same year, a new church dedicated to Emperor Constantine and Empress Helena was built on the site.

Another former church site exists in what is now the Albanian Strukar Mahala.

Among the present-day Albanians of Veliki Trnovac, the earliest settlers arrived about 170 years ago. They were the ancestors of four clans: Trup, Strukar, Gash, and Terzi. Other Albanian clans settled there afterward. Today, Veliki Trnovac has three largely neglected cemeteries: Albanian, Serbian, and Roma. For the needs of the Muslim population, there are two mosques. The mosque in Strukar Mahala was built approximately 46 years ago. The village also contains two tekkes (dervish lodges), which were built by the ancestors of the Albanian dervish family known as Adži Musa.

Near Veliki Trnovac, the border between Serbia and the Ottoman Empire was established in 1878. According to local accounts, the Ottoman authorities intended to proclaim the settlement a town, establish a weekly market day, and build military barracks there. However, the local Albanian villagers, who were described as being very powerful, did not allow this. As a result, the neighboring settlement of Bujanovac was designated as the town instead.

=== Insurgency aftermath ===
There is an agreement between the Serbian authorities and local Albanians that Veliki Trnovac will not be attended by police in exchange for peace on the part of local population, an agreement that formed part of the Končulj Agreement in 2001 ending the Insurgency in the Preševo Valley.

After the conflict, at the entrance to Veliki Trnovac, local Albanians erected a monument to Ridvan Qazimi, a former commander of the paramilitary UCPMB, and a four-day manifestation, "Commander Lleshi"s Days", is held in his honor every year. He also got his own museum, which opened on 26 November 2012 in Veliki Trnovac. It was built by local Albanians with the help of the Albanian diaspora. It exhibits Captain Leshi's personal belongings - photographs, uniform, weapons as well as the jeep in which he was killed.

=== 2022 general election ===
During the 2022 general election, elections were repeated five times in Veliki Trnovac. Because of it, official results were announced three months after the official election date.

== Notable people ==
- Nexhat Daci, Kosovar politician
- Shaip Kamberi, Serbian ethnic Albanian politician
- Berat Djimsiti, Albanian footballer
- Ridvan Qazimi, commander of the UÇPMB
- Sadat Pajaziti, football manager
