= 63rd Parachute Brigade =

Special forces unit of the Serbian Armed Forces

- 63. падобранска бригада
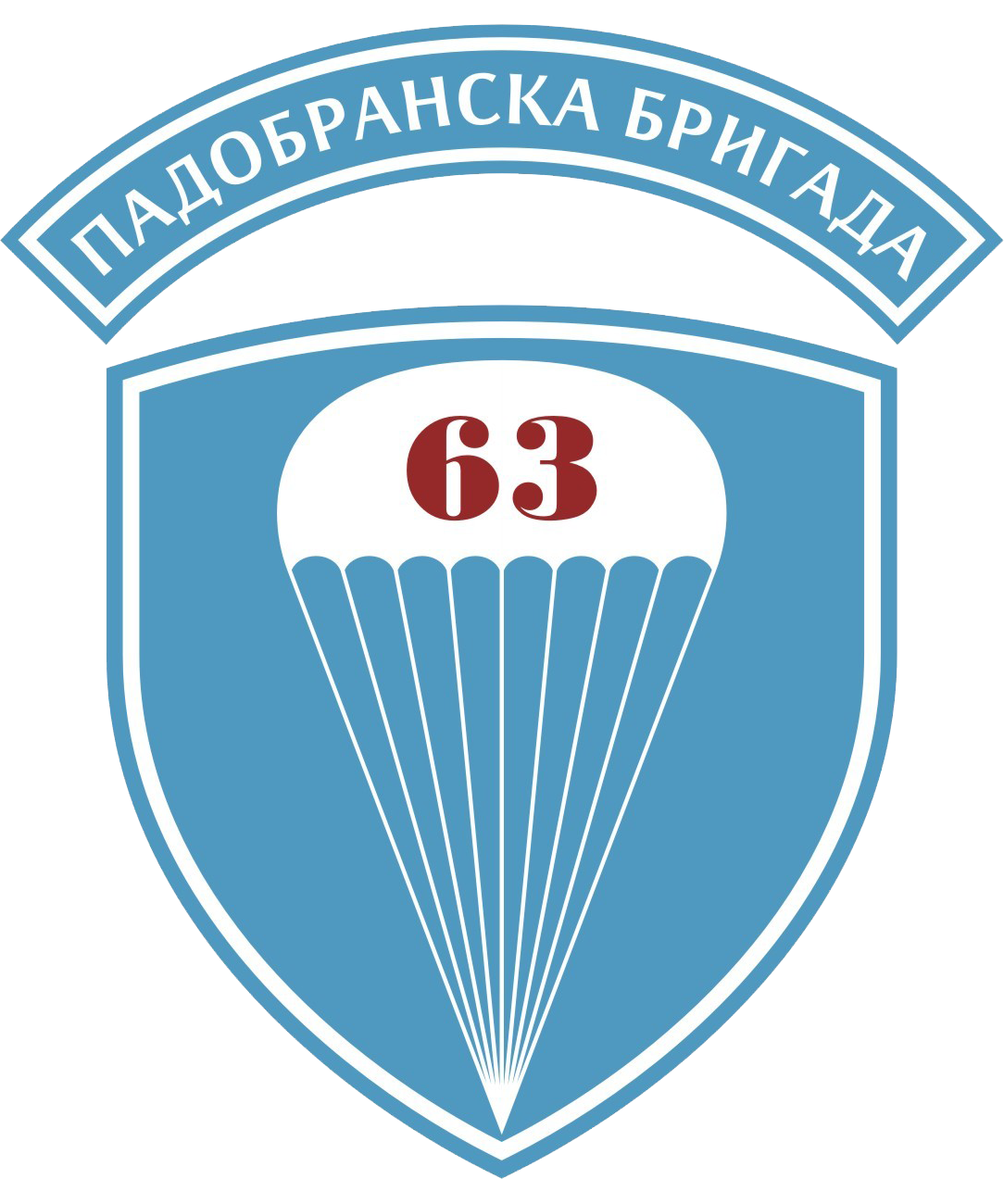
- Active: 1953–1959; 1967–2006; 2019–present
- Country: Serbia
- Branch: Serbian General Staff
- Type: Special forces
- Role: Airborne force Special reconnaissance Direct action
- Part of: Serbian Armed Forces
- Garrison/HQ: Niš Air Base
- Nicknames: The Sixty-third (Šezdeset-treća)
- Mottos: For the fatherland, for the comrade, for the rifle, for soldiers' and warriors' honor, paratroopers of the 63rd Parachute Brigade, ENGAGE! (Za otadžbinu, za druga, za pušku, za vojničku i ratničku čast, padobranci 63. padobranske brigade, RADE!)
- Anniversaries: 14 October
- Engagements: Yugoslav Wars; Croatian War of Independence; Battle of Zadar; Bosnian War; Operation Čapljina; Kosovo War; Battle of Košare; Albania–Yugoslav border incident; Insurgency in the Preševo Valley; Battle of Oraovica
- Website: Official website

Commanders
- Current commander: Brig. general Aleksandar Stupar

The 63rd Parachute Brigade (Serbian: 63. падобранска бригада, romanized: 63. padobranska brigada) is an airborne and special reconnaissance unit, one of two special forces brigades (other being 72nd Brigade for Special Operations) of the Serbian Armed Forces. It is under the command of the General Staff and is based at Niš Air Base.

Formed in 1953, it was the elite unit of both Yugoslav People's Army and Armed Forces of Serbia and Montenegro. Reconfigured in 2006 to a battalion within a newly formed Serbian Armed Forces, the "63rd" regained the status of a brigade in 2019.

== History ==
The first parachute jump in Serbia was taken at the Novi Sad Airport on 2 September 1926. Second Lieutenant Dragutin Dolanski was dropped from an altitude of 650 meters (2,100 feet). The year 1938 was particularly significant for the Yugoslav parachuting, since that was when the First International Aircraft Exhibition was staged in Belgrade. The Exhibition at the Zemun Airport included a combined jump of 10 parachutists, including Katarina Matanović, the first and only woman parachutist in Yugoslavia prior to the 1941 war. The Royal Yugoslav Army had realized the significance of parachute units, and a school of parachuting was opened at Pančevo on 1 October 1939. The School was moved to Novi Sad in 1941, where it remained stationed until the outbreak of the World War II, whence a move to Niš was scheduled. The fate of the School of Parachuting in the Invasion of Yugoslavia has not yet been ascertained. In that war, paratroop raids had a significant role in almost all major military operations. In mid-1944, the Yugoslav Partisans' Supreme Staff requested help from the Allies to form a parachute unit. After the transfer of the Supreme Command to the island of Vis, urgent orders to lower-level commands were delivered by parachuted messengers.

In September 1944, a hundred troops were taken to Bari in Italy, for a parachuting training course. Another hundred volunteers were selected for training from among the wounded soldiers recovering in Italy. The training and drops from airplanes took place in a training centre at Gravina. The School of Parachuting was successfully completed by 191 soldiers and officers. After completion of the training course on 14 October 1944, the First Parachute Battalion was formed, with Lieutenant Čedomir Vranić appointed its commander. The 1st Parachute Battalion recruits also underwent diversionary training, topography and target-shooting courses, and had intensive live-ammunition shooting practice. The Allies supplied the Battalion with complete weaponry and materiel (except for parachutes). In December 1944, the Battalion was shipped to Dubrovnik and on 6 January 1945 arrived in Belgrade. The Battalion however had no combat experience during the Second World War and in July 1945, the 1st Parachute Battalion was disbanded.

Apart from Italy, a number of Yugoslav paratroopers were trained in the USSR during the World War II. Upon return to the country, they were integrated into the existing parachute units. In the 1946–1950 period, a parachute training course was operative under the Air Force Command. In 1946, on the order of the Supreme Staff, the 46th Parachute Battalion was formed at Bela Crkva. In 1948, the Battalion was relocated to Novi Sad. Because of the threat of potential invasion from the Soviet Union, the Battalion was again relocated in 1951, this time to Mostar. In 1952, the 46th Parachute Battalion was divided into two parts. One part remained at Mostar, and the other was transferred to Šabac out of which the new 63rd Parachute Battalion was formed.

By Order No. 200 of the Armed Forces Supreme Command of 5 February 1953, the 63rd Parachute Brigade was formed at Šabac. The brigade was relocated to Novi Sad in 1954 thanks to more agreeable circumstances. Considerable errors have been committed in the understanding of this unit's use and combat tasks. The prevailing position was that the Yugoslav People's Army did not need larger airborne units, as, presumably, battlefield drops from the air had no chance of success in a nuclear war and with modern anti-aircraft defence and mass armoured vehicles in use. On the order of the JNA General Headquarters, the 63rd Parachute Brigade was dismissed in late 1959, and out of it three independent parachute battalions were formed: 159th Parachute Battalion in Skopski Petrovec Air Base; 127th Parachute Battalion at Batajnica Air Base; and 148th Parachute Battalion at Cerklje Air Base. In 1964, a Parachute Training Centre was formed by combining the 159th and 127th Parachute Battalions in Niš. The 63rd Parachute Brigade was once again established on 5 December 1967 by combining the Parachute Training Centre and the 148th Parachute Battalion. From 1967 on, the 63rd Parachute Brigade has been stationed in Niš.

In combat missions during the Yugoslav Wars of the early 1990s, the 63rd Parachute Brigade had 14 casualties: one in War in Slovenia, six in War in Croatia, and seven in War in Bosnia and Herzegovina. Brigade had several deployments in critical hotspots such as Cerklje Air Base in June 1991 (War in Slovenia), Zemunik Donji Air Base in September–October 1991 (War in Croatia) and Čapljina in April 1992 (War in Bosnia and Herzegovina). The Čapljina Operation was particularly significant since only 16 paratroopers supported by the crews of nine Mil Mi-8 helicopters successfully completed a rescue mission in which they air-lifted some 170 soldiers and civilians from the Yugoslav Army barracks in the town that were for days being completely besieged by Croatian paramilitary forces. During the 1999 Kosovo War, the 63rd Brigade was engaged in Battle of Košare where it fought against the KLA but also NATO diversionary detachments attempting raids from Albania on the territory of Serbia, losing six of its members during the course of two-month long battle.

== Structure ==
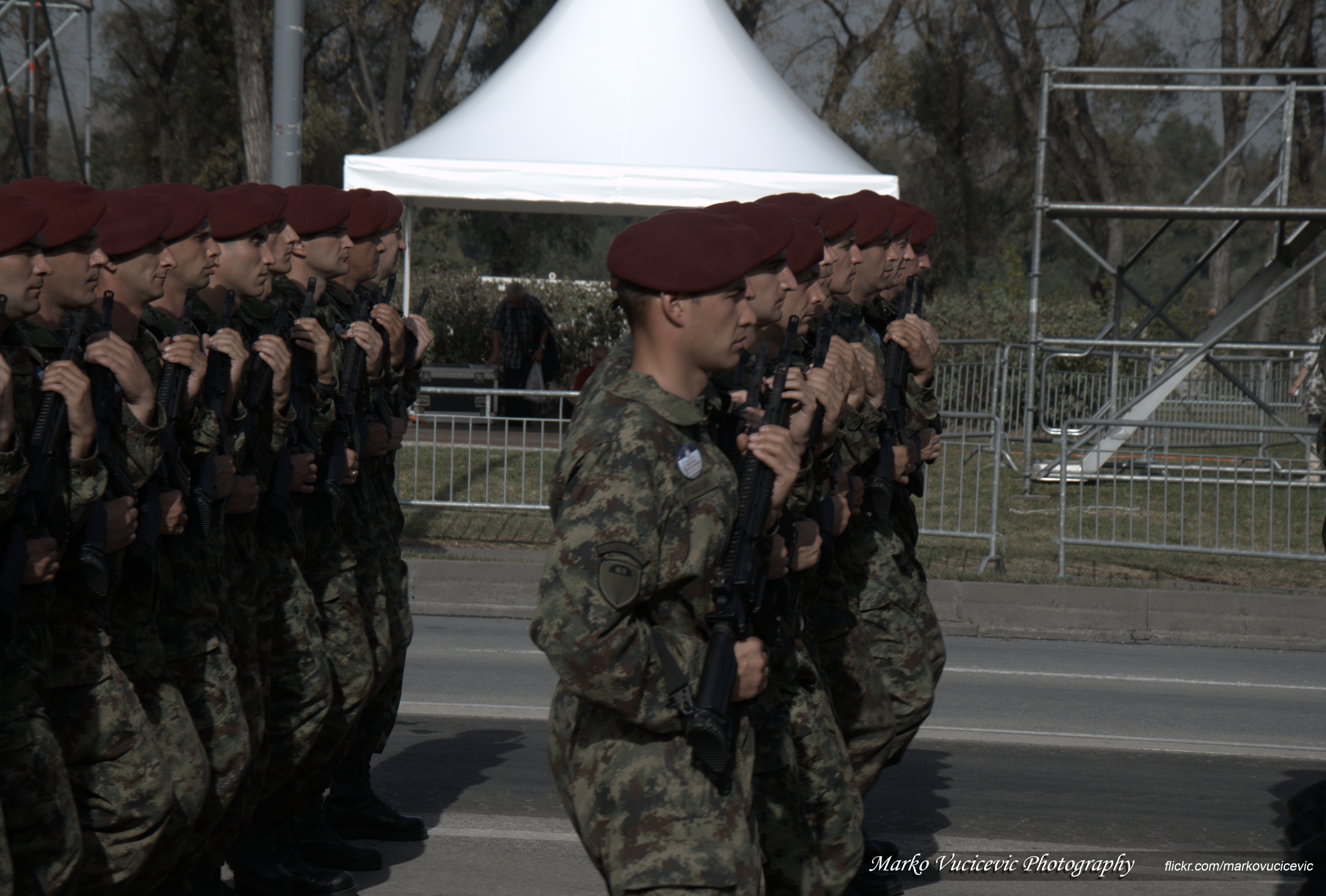
Members of the brigade at 2014 military parade

Although with a brigade status (in order to better honor traditions of the past), 63rd Parachute Brigade is currently more of a battalion-size unit with proclaimed aim of reaching size of a brigade in order to readdress new defense tasks due to increased security threats. It is organized along company lines. There are 4 parachute companies, one CSAR company, one training company, one logistics company as well as a command company.

== Missions ==
The 63rd Parachute Brigade is a modern, highly skilled and experienced Special Forces unit intended for special, reconnaissance and diversionary operations deep behind enemy lines.

== Training ==
Enlisted soldiers have to have at least two years service experience in other units of the Serbian Armed Forces before applying for a position in the 63rd Parachute Brigade. Besides that, all candidates need to fulfill a lot of other requirements and only about two-thirds of all candidates pass the psychophysical tests.

Brigade uses various training grounds and shooting ranges and for training purposes. Training in is divided in three stages, and lasts for three years.

- Selective training phase lasts 13 weeks. The focus of this pahase is aimed at selecting the best mentally and physically capable and highly motivated candidates that can withstand the challenges they may encounter during the service. During selective training candidates need to complete the following courses: physical training, shooting and fire training, tactical training, tactical training for paratroopers, topography and orientation on the ground, parachute training and a final exam.
- Basic training phase lasts one year and consists of: physical training, shooting and fire training, tactical training, tactical training for paratroopers, topography and orientation on the land, resources and systems for fire support, resources and procedures for telecommunications traffic and tactical exercises.
- Advanced training phase lasts for two years and includes training through exchange rate revaluation while attending the following courses: course for officers and non-commissioned officers, advanced parachute training, course for parachuting instructor.

=== Parachute training ===
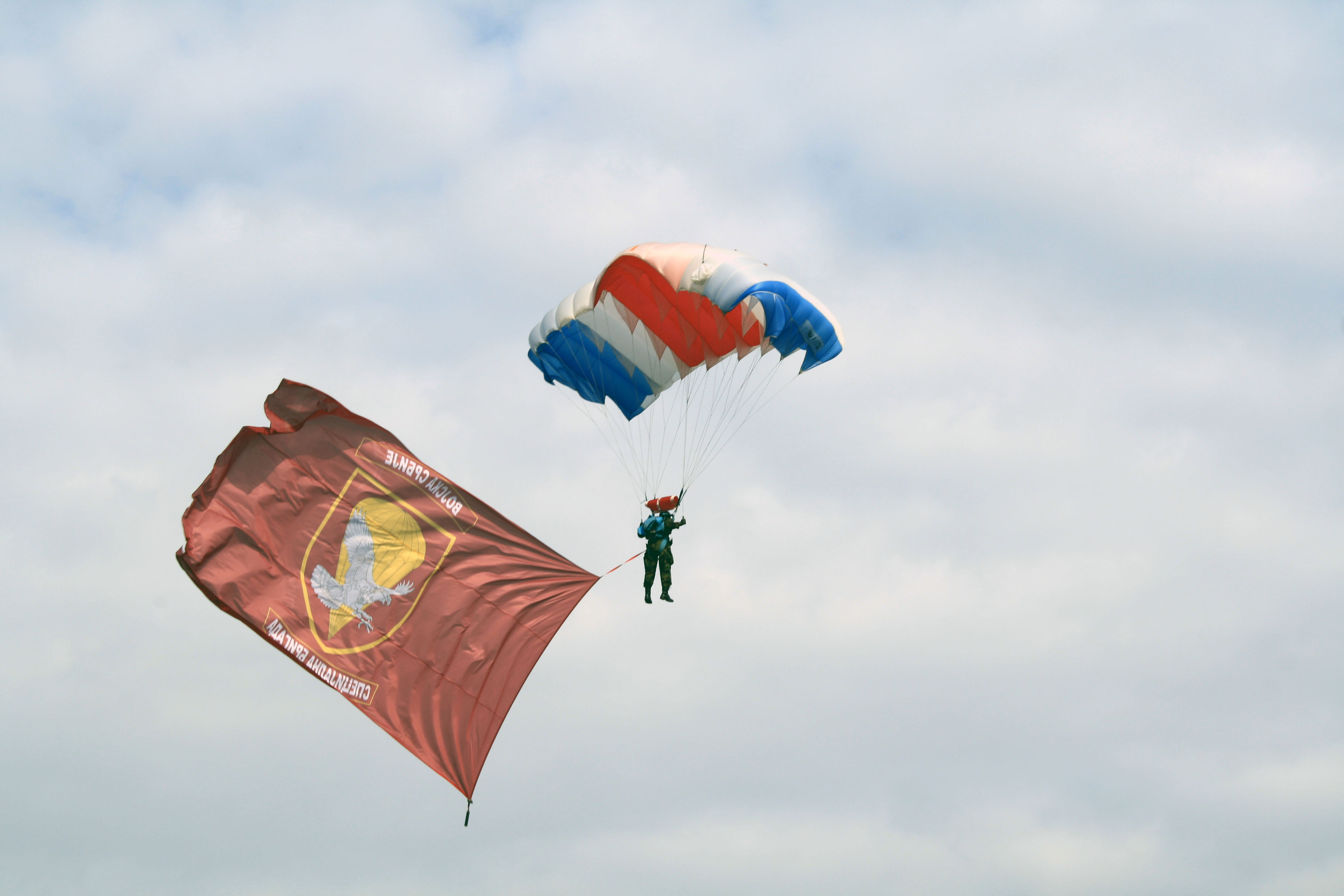
Paratrooper of 63rd Airborne Brigade

The 63rd Parachute Brigade is a unique "military school of parachuting". In the 1947-1990 period, 330,000 parachute dives had been taken, and since 1990, over 10,000 drops have been made each year. The 63rd Parachute Brigade earned the repute of one of the best units thanks to the exceptional efforts on the part of the troops and officers and high marks obtained in combined maneuvers.

When the competences of the 63rd Parachute Brigade members are analyzed, the point to underscore is the safety coefficient of parachute training, a parameter which, in spite of tens of thousands of dives made, is by far better than the comparable safety indicates for parachute units of the world's most powerful armies. The members of the brigade have participated in numerous parachuting and other domestic and international sports events, where they achieved enviable results.

Parachute training is conducted at brigade's home base, Niš Air Base.

== Weapons and equipment ==
The main weapon used by the 63rd Parachute Brigade is the FN SCAR L 5.56x45mm assault rifle. The H&K UMP series are used for the close-quarter battle. The H&K USP is the standard sidearm carried by the soldiers. The FN Minimi is used as light machine gun, 5.56mm and 7.62mm, and snipers use the Sako TRG 42. Land Rover Defender is utility vehicle used by the brigade.

== Traditions ==
=== Anniversary ===
The anniversary of the unit is celebrated on 14 October, in memory of the day when the 1st Parachute Battalion was formed in Bary, Italy in 1944.

=== Patron saint ===
The unit's slava or its saint's feast day is Intercession of the Theotokos.

=== Motto ===
Motto of the Brigade is: "For the Fatherland, for the comrades, for the rifles, for soldiers' and warriors' honor, paratroopers of the 63rd Parachute Brigade, ENGAGE!" (Za otadžbinu, za druga, za pušku, za vojničku i ratničku čast, padobranci 63. padobranske brigade, RADE!). Author of the motto is Dr Mirko Đorđević, aviation medicine specialist as well as a paratrooper with over 7,700 drops conducted.

=== Colors ===
The 63rd Parachute wear antique ruby beret.

=== Decorations ===
Order of the People's Hero (1999)

== See also ==
- 72nd Brigade for Special Operations

== Bibliography ==
Books

- Jugoslovensko padobranstvo (1926–1990) ISBN 86-367-0773-0
- Babac, Dušan Specijalne jedinice jugoslovenske vojske u Aprilskom ratu ISBN 978-86-85957-12-3
