= Gospođince =

Gospođince Госпођинце (Serbian) Gosponicë (Albanian)
- Village (Selo)
- Location within Serbia
- Coordinates: 42°21′51″N 21°37′24″E
- Country: Serbia
- District: Pčinja District
- Municipality: Preševo

Area
  - Total: 3.35 km^{2} (1.29 sq mi)

Population (2002)
  - Total: 41
  - Density: 12/km^{2} (32/sq mi)
- Time zone: UTC+1 (CET)
  - Summer (DST): UTC+2 (CEST)

Gospođince (Serbian Cyrillic: Госпођинце; Albanian: Gosponicë) is a village located in the municipality of Preševo, Serbia. According to the 2002 census, the village has a population of 41 (100,0 %) people, all Albanians.
