= Gornja Šušaja =

Gornja Šušaja Горња Шушаја (Serbian) Shoshajë e Epërme (Albanian)
- Village (Selo)
- Location within Serbia
- Coordinates: 42°21′59″N 21°40′09″E
- Country: Serbia
- District: Pčinja District
- Municipality: Preševo

Area
  - Total: 2.45 km^{2} (0.95 sq mi)

Population (2002)
  - Total: 101
  - Density: 41.2/km^{2} (107/sq mi)
- Time zone: UTC+1 (CET)
  - Summer (DST): UTC+2 (CEST)

Gornja Šušaja (Serbian Cyrillic: Горња Шушаја; Albanian: Shoshajë e Epërme) is a village located in the municipality of Preševo, Serbia. According to the 2002 census, the village has a population of 101 people, all Albanians.
