= Bukovac, Preševo =

Bukovac Буковац (Serbian) Bukoc (Albanian)
- Village (Selo)
- Location within Serbia
- Country: Serbia
- District: Pčinja District
- Municipality: Preševo

Population (2002)
  - Total: 108
- Time zone: UTC+1 (CET)
  - Summer (DST): UTC+2 (CEST)

Bukovac (Serbian Cyrillic: Буковац; Albanian: Bukoc) is a village in the municipality of Preševo, Serbia. According to the 2002 census, the village has a population of 108 people of whom 67 (62,03 %) were ethnic Albanians and 41 (37,96 %) others.
