= Ilince =

Ilince Илинце (Serbian) Ilincë (Albanian)
- Village (Selo)
- Location within Serbia
- Coordinates: 42°21′16″N 21°35′43″E
- Country: Serbia
- District: Pčinja District
- Municipality: Preševo

Area
  - Total: 4.66 km^{2} (1.80 sq mi)

Population (2002)
  - Total: 136
  - Density: 29.2/km^{2} (75.6/sq mi)
- Time zone: UTC+1 (CET)
  - Summer (DST): UTC+2 (CEST)

Ilince (Serbian Cyrillic: Илинце; Albanian: Ilincë) is a village in the municipality of Preševo, Serbia. According to the 2002 census, the village has a population of 136 people. Of these, 134 (98,52 %) were ethnic Albanians, and 2 (1,47 %) were Hungarians.
