= Norča =

Norča Норча (Serbian) Norçë (Albanian)
- Village (Selo)
- Location within Serbia
- Coordinates: 42°17′56″N 21°38′27″E
- Country: Serbia
- District: Pčinja District
- Municipality: Preševo

Area
  - Total: 6.11 km^{2} (2.36 sq mi)

Population (2002)
  - Total: 992
  - Density: 162/km^{2} (421/sq mi)
- Time zone: UTC+1 (CET)
  - Summer (DST): UTC+2 (CEST)

Norča (Serbian Cyrillic: Норча; Albanian: Norçë) is a village located in the municipality of Preševo, Serbia. According to the 2002 census, the village has a population of 992 people. Of these, 979 (98,68 %) were ethnic Albanians, 4 (0,40 %) were Serbs, 3 (0,30 %) were Muslims, and 5 (0,50 %) others.
