= Muhovac =

Muhovac Муховац Muhoc
- Village
- Location within Serbia
- Coordinates: 42°34′03″N 21°45′10″E
- Country: Serbia
- District: Pčinja District
- Municipality: Bujanovac

Area
  - Total: 6.59 km^{2} (2.54 sq mi)
- Elevation: 739 m (2,425 ft)

Population (2002)
  - Total: 570
  - Density: 86/km^{2} (220/sq mi)
- Time zone: UTC+1 (CET)
  - Summer (DST): UTC+2 (CEST)

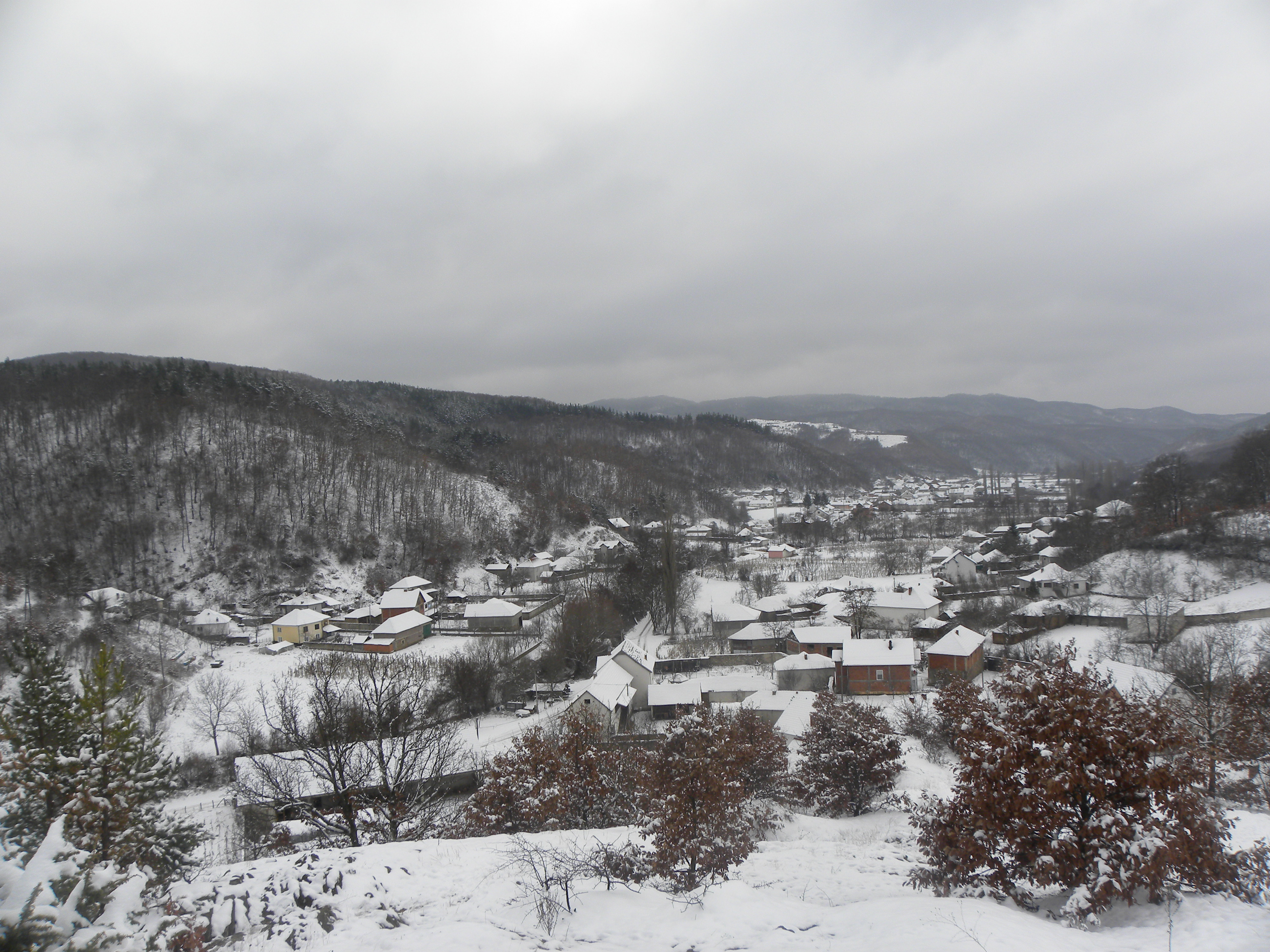
Muhovac Village

Muhovac (Serbian Cyrillic: Муховац; Albanian: Muhoc) is a village located in the municipality of Bujanovac, Serbia. According to the 2002 census, the town has a population of 570 people. Of these, 567 (99,47 %) were ethnic Albanians, 2 (0,35 %) were Bosniaks and 1 (0,17 %) other.
