= Đorđevac =

Đorđevac Ђорђевац Gjergjec
- Village
- Location within Serbia
- Coordinates: 42°21′13″N 21°44′35″E
- Country: Serbia
- Region: Southern and Eastern Serbia
- District: Pčinja
- Municipality: Bujanovac

Population (2002)
  - Total: 0
- Time zone: UTC+1 (CET)
  - Summer (DST): UTC+2 (CEST)

Đorđevac (Albanian: Gjergjec) is a village in the municipality of Bujanovac, Serbia. According to the 1991 census, the village had a population of 65 people, all Albanians. According to the 2002 census, the village was without inhabitants.
