= Dobrosin =

Dobrosin Добросин
- Village
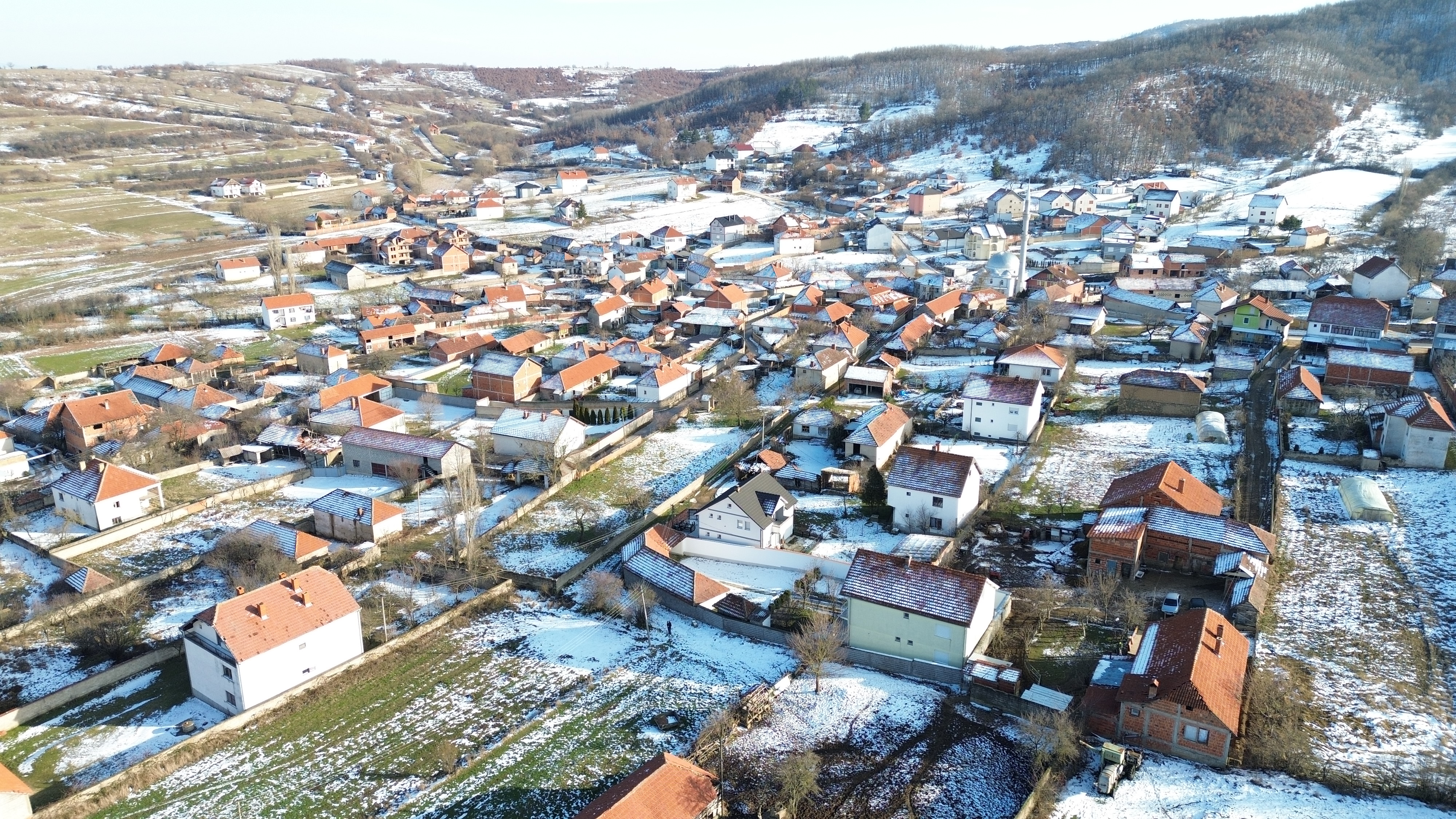

- Location within Serbia
- Coordinates: 42°26′58″N 21°38′10″E
- Country: Serbia
- District: Pčinja District
- Municipality: Bujanovac

Area
  - Total: 8.57 km^{2} (3.31 sq mi)
- Elevation: 677 m (2,221 ft)

Population (2002)
  - Total: 747
  - Density: 87.2/km^{2} (226/sq mi)
- Time zone: UTC+1 (CET)
  - Summer (DST): UTC+2 (CEST)

Dobrosin (Serbian Cyrillic: Добросин, Albanian: Dobrosin) is a village located in the municipality of Bujanovac, southern Serbia.

The village is located on the administrative border with Kosovo, some 16 kilometres from Bujanovac.

== History ==
After the Kosovo War (1998–99), a demilitarized zone was established between Kosovo (governed by United Nations) and inner Serbia and Montenegro, which included Dobrosin. The Liberation Army of Preševo, Medveđa and Bujanovac, an ethnic Albanian organization, was formed in the village in early January 2000. It sought the unification of Albanian-inhabited Preševo Valley with Kosovo, leading an insurgency between 12 June 1999–1 June 2001.

In 2012, three attacks were made on the Serbian border police station at Dobrosin.

== Demographics ==
The village is inhabited by a majority of ethnic Albanians. In 1991 census, the settlement had a population of 1,029 people. In 2002 census, the settlement had a population of 747 people. Of these, 719 (96,25 %) were ethnic Albanians, and 27 (3,61 %) others.
