= Turija (Bujanovac) =

Turija Турија Turi
- Village
- Location within Serbia
- Country: Serbia
- Region: Southern and Eastern Serbia
- District: Pčinja
- Municipality: Bujanovac

Population (2002)
  - Total: 400
- Time zone: UTC+1 (CET)
  - Summer (DST): UTC+2 (CEST)

Turija (Serbian Cyrillic: Турија, Albanian: Turi) is a village in the municipality of Bujanovac, Serbia. According to the 2020 census, the town has a population of 400 people. Of these, 395 (98,75 %) were ethnic Albanians, 4 (1,0 %) were Serbs, and 1 (0,25 %) other.
