= Breznica (Bujanovac) =

Breznica Брезница Breznicë
- Village
- Location within Serbia
- Coordinates: 42.5367°N 21.7150°E
- Country: Serbia
- Region: Southern and Eastern Serbia
- District: Pčinja
- Municipality: Bujanovac

Area
  - Total: 20.23 km^{2} (7.81 sq mi)
- Elevation: 679 m (2,228 ft)

Population (2002)
  - Total: 1,362
  - Density: 67.33/km^{2} (174.4/sq mi)
- Time zone: UTC+1 (CET)
  - Summer (DST): UTC+2 (CEST)

Breznica (Serbian Cyrillic: Брезница; Albanian: Breznicë) is a village located in the municipality of Bujanovac, Serbia. According to the 2002 census, the town has a population of 1,362 people. Of these, 1334 (97,94 %) were ethnic Albanians, 1 (0,07 %) Serb, and 11 (0,80 %) others.
