= Ninoslav Krstić =

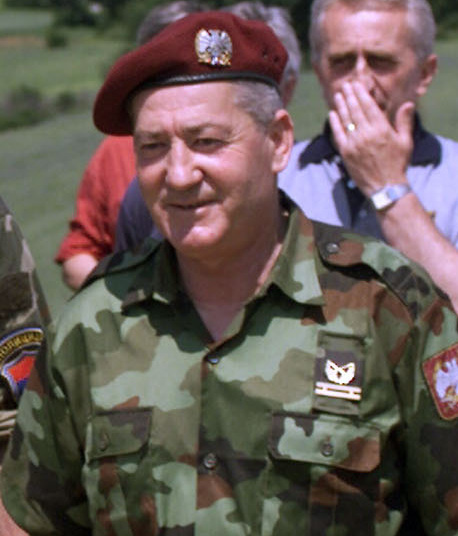
- Lt. Col. Gen. Ninoslav Krstić as Commander of Joint Security Forces during Insurgency in the Preševo Valley in 2001
- Born: 10 July 1946; Niševac, PR Serbia, Yugoslavia
- Died: 5 July 2012 (aged 65); Belgrade, Serbia
- Military career
- Allegiance: SFR Yugoslavia; FR Yugoslavia
- Rank: Lieutenant Colonel General
- Commands: Joint Security Forces (2001)
- Conflicts: Kosovo War; Insurgency in the Preševo Valley
- Other work: Vice President of Coordination Body of Government of Serbia for Preševo, Bujanovac and Medveđa; Head of Forum for Security and Democracy

Ninoslav Krstić (Serbian Cyrillic: Нинослав Крстић; 10 July 1946 – 5 July 2012) was a Serbian and Yugoslav general who served as the commander of the Joint Security Force during the 1999–2001 Insurgency in the Preševo Valley.

== Biography ==
Krstić was born on 10 July 1946, in the village of Niševac, near Svrljig. He graduated from technical high school, and after that from the Military Academy (1968). He graduated from the highest military schools: the Command and Staff Academy (1984) and the School of National Defense (1989). During his career, he was on duty from company commander to corps commander. He was reassigned five times, serving in Niš, Leskovac, Kosovska Mitrovica, Belgrade and Novi Sad. He became a general in 1994 and was appointed commander of the Novi Sad Corps. On the Day of the Yugoslav Army, 16 June 1998, he was appointed Chief of Staff and also Deputy Commander of the First Army. He was promoted to the rank of lieutenant general on 25 December 1998. In late March 1999, during the Kosovo War, Krstić was injured in a NATO airstrike targeting a Yugoslav Army command post. General Srboljub Trajković and several other officers were killed in the same attack. Krstić was appointed head of the VJ inspection on 28 December 1999.

He was appointed head of the command of the Joint VJ and Police, which entered the buffer zone in southern Serbia in March 2001. He signed an agreement with KFOR Commander Karl Cabidjoz on behalf of the VJ on the VJ's entry into the buffer zone.

He was removed from the post of commander of the Joint Forces by the decision of Yugoslav President Vojislav Koštunica and at the request of the VJ Chief of Staff, Colonel General Nebojša Pavković.

Krstić died on 5 July 2012 after a short illness.
