= Mali Trnovac =

Mali Trnovac Мали Трновац Tërnoc i Vogël
- Village
- Location within Serbia
- Coordinates: 42°30′00″N 21°42′10″E
- Country: Serbia
- District: Pčinja District
- Municipality: Bujanovac

Area
  - Total: 7.04 km^{2} (2.72 sq mi)
- Elevation: 607 m (1,991 ft)

Population (2002)
  - Total: 343
  - Density: 48.7/km^{2} (126/sq mi)
- Time zone: UTC+1 (CET)
  - Summer (DST): UTC+2 (CEST)

Mali Trnovac (Serbian Cyrillic: Мали Трновац; Albanian: Tërnoc i Vogël) is a village located in the municipality of Bujanovac, Serbia. According to the 2002 census, the town has a population of 343 people. Of these, 339 (98,83 %) were ethnic Albanians, and 1 (0,29 %) other.
