= Lučane, Serbia =

Lučane Лучане Lluçan
- Village
- Location within Serbia
- Coordinates: 42°26′49″N 21°42′15″E
- Country: Serbia
- Region: Southern and Eastern Serbia
- District: Pčinja
- Municipality: Bujanovac

Population (2002)
  - Total: 1,091
- Time zone: UTC+1 (CET)
  - Summer (DST): UTC+2 (CEST)

Lučane (Serbian Cyrillic: ЛучанеAlbanian: Lluçan) is a village in the municipality of Bujanovac, Serbia. According to the 2002 census, the town has a population of 1091 people. Of these, 1089 (99,81 %) were ethnic Albanians, 1 (0,09 %) Serb and 1 (0,09 %) other.
