= Kumanovo Agreement =

1999 Accord ending the Kosovo War

Military Technical Agreement between the International Security Force (KFOR) and the Governments of the Federal Republic of Yugoslavia and the Republic of Serbia.
- Type: Ceasefire agreement
- Signed: 9 June 1999
- Location: Kumanovo, Republic of Macedonia
- Effective: 10 June 1999
- Signatories: Svetozar Marjanović; Obrad Stevanović; Mike Jackson
- Parties: FR Yugoslavia including the Government of the Republic of Serbia separately; KFOR
- Languages: French; English; Serbian
- Military Technical Agreement

The Military Technical Agreement, also known as the Kumanovo Agreement, signed between the International Security Force (KFOR) and the Governments of the Federal Republic of Yugoslavia and the Republic of Serbia, was an accord concluded on 9 June 1999 in Kumanovo, Republic of Macedonia. It resulted in the end of the Kosovo War, and established new basic relations between Yugoslavia and the Kosovo Force, which would replace units of the Yugoslav Army in Kosovo, as well as the withdrawal of the Police of Serbia from that territory.

== Background ==
The run-up to the Kumanovo Agreement involved a flurry of negotiations not just between Yugoslavia and Serbia but also NATO and Russia. Despite the initial agreement, for instance, on a withdrawal timetable for the Serbian forces in Kosovo, NATO's Operation Allied Force was still underway, pending the completion of full withdrawal of the Serbian troops.

There are sources that cite the role that Russia played in the immediate resolution of the accord. There was a claim about a meeting between Russian Foreign Minister Igor Ivanov and U.S. Secretary of State Madeleine Albright. An initial agreement between the two parties was reached, which involved a commitment on the part of NATO to cease its airstrikes and a willingness to remove a passage it wanted to include in the Kumanovo Agreement in exchange for Russian support for a forthcoming UN Resolution agreed by the Group of Eight. Without the Russian participation, the UN Security Council Resolution on Kosovo would not have been approved and the NATO airstrikes would have continued.

== Provisions of the agreement ==
The key provisions of the agreement were designed to enable the following:

- A cessation of hostilities between NATO's Kosovo Force (KFOR) and the Federal Republic of Yugoslavia followed by an end to the bombing campaign should FRY comply effectively with the agreement.
- Definition of a 25 km air safety zone and 5 km "Ground Safety Zone" around Kosovo's boundaries, into FRY-administered territory where necessary, which FRY military forces could not enter without KFOR permission. Lightly armed police continued to operate within the zone outside of Kosovo according to the agreement.
- During the 11 days following signing, the staged withdrawal from Kosovo by FRY forces, including the clearing of military assets (mines, booby traps) from communications lines, and the provision of information to NATO about remaining hazards.
- The deployment of civil and security forces within Kosovo, pursuant to soon-to-be adopted United Nations Security Council Resolution.
- Authorization for assistance to, and use of necessary force by NATO's Kosovo Force to create a secure environment for the international civilian presence and its peace settlement mission.

The NATO presence was sanctioned by the United Nations Security Council Resolution 1244, which authorized UN Member states and international organizations to maintain an international security presence, as Kosovo Force (KFOR), whose mandate is open-ended unless the UN Security Council decides otherwise. The KFOR was authorized to take all actions necessary to ensure compliance with the agreement.

== See also ==
- Demilitarized zone
- Rambouillet Agreement
