= Hashania =

Hashania is a mountainous and ethnographic region in Kosovo and Serbia. It has an area of 350 square kilometres (140 sq mi).

== Geography ==
Hashania contains 9 villages, 2 of which are in Kosovo and belong to the municipality of Kamenica, they are: Kranidell and Sedllare. And 7 villages in Serbia which belong to the municipality of Bujanovac, they are: Đorđevac, Gornje Novo Selo, Čar, Pribovce, Ravno Bučje, Suharno and Zarbince. The Zarbica river runs through the region.

== History ==
During the Expulsion of the Albanians of 1877-1878 in the Sanjak of Niš, many Albanians became muhaxhirs and settled the region.

In 1948 the region had 4312 inhabitants.

The highest Point in The Hashania Region is Maja e Zarbicës at 1250 Metres Above Sea Level.

== Demographics ==
In 1992 the region had 3202 inhabitants. Most of the inhabitants in Hashania are Muslim Albanians.
