= Rakovac =

Rakovac may refer to:

== People ==
- Rakovac, a Croatian surname
  - Dragutin Rakovac (1813–1854), Croatian writer, translator and journalist
  - Ladislav Rakovac (1847–1906), Croatian physician

== Geography ==
Serbia

- Rakovac (Beočin)
- Rakovac (Bujanovac)
- Rakovac (Novi Pazar)
- Rakovac (Raška)
- Rakovac Monastery

Bosnia and Herzegovina

- Rakovac (Novi Grad)
- Rakovac (Bratunac)
- Rakovac (Pale)

Croatia

- Rakovac, Karlovac, a section of the city of Karlovac, Croatia
