= Battle of Desivojca =

Battle in World War II

- Part of World War II in Yugoslavia and the Insurgency in Karadak–Gollak
Date	19–20 December 1944
Location	Desivojca, Gollak (modern-day Kosovo)
Result	Ballist victory

Belligerents
Balli Kombetar; Support: (Nazi Germany) Germany	Yugoslav Partisans

Commanders and leaders
Sylë Zarbica; Mulla Idriz Gjilani; Shyt Mareci; Muharrem Fejza; Shefki Desivojca; Sylejman Qarri; Jusuf Baftjari; Ramiz Cërnica; Fazli Ramadani; Lam Breznica	(Yugoslav Partisans) Vlada Popović (Yugoslav Partisans) Јovo Šotra

Units involved
Ballists from Gollak	(Yugoslav Partisans) 17th Macedonian Brigade

Strength
Unknown	(Yugoslav Partisans) 1,800 soldiers

Casualties and losses
Unknown	(Yugoslav Partisans) Heavy

The Battle of Desivojca took place on 19 December 1944 during World War II, between Yugoslav Partisans and Balli Kombëtar forces, in the territory of German occupied Albania.

== Background ==
On 1 December 1944, during a meeting in Tërpezë (Viti), it was decided that all Albanian nationalist forces (Ballists), who were collaborators of Nazi Germany, should unite to liberate and safeguard Gjilan and Ferizaj from the atrocities committed by the Partisans and Chetniks. Following this decision, the Committee of Albanian Resistance for Eastern Kosovo was established on 17 December 1944, in the village Zarbincë of Hashania. Mulla Idriz Gjilani was appointed as the commander in chief. The committee included resistance unit commanders from Gollak and Karadak, such as Xheladin Kurbalia, Jusuf Baftjari, Ymer Myqybaba, Sylë Hotla, and others, aiming to swiftly implement defensive measures against Partisan-Chetnik attacks along the border of Eastern Kosovo.

== Battle ==
On December 19, 1944, the 17th Macedonian Brigade, composed of 1,800 soldiers, advanced towards Desivojca, seizing control of the surrounding Gollak Highlands before launching an attack on the village. Upon their arrival, the brigade immediately began perpetrating acts of violence and atrocities, including burning homes and killing innocent civilians. In response, a considerable number of Ballists, led by Mulla Idriz Gjilani and Hoxhe Lipovica, mobilized from the mountainous terrain to come to the aid of the villagers. On December 20, 1944, Ballist forces, under the command of Sylë Zarbica, launched a swift assault on the Partisans from the North, while Riza Shkodra led an attack from the south. Simultaneously, a battalion of Partisans, attempting to prevent encirclement, was ambushed and decimated. The confrontation culminated in the complete annihilation of the 17th Macedonian Brigade, resulting in devastating losses.

== Aftermath ==
On 23 December 1944, following this decisive victory in the Gollak Highlands, local fighters from Desivojca and other parts of Gollak and Hashania, along with soldiers from Karadak under the command of Jusuf Baftjari, Sylë Hotla and Mulla Idriz Gjilani, marched towards Gjilan with the aim of reclaiming the city, yet their efforts were unsuccessful.

== Sources ==
- Selmani, Aliriza (2011), Gjithkund ne Kosove solemnisht u kremtua festa e Fiter - Bajramit [Everywhere in Kosovo, the Fitr - Bajram holiday was solemnly celebrated] (in Albanian), Dituria Islame
