= Uzovo =

Uzovo may refer to:

- Uzovo, Bulgaria
- Uzovo (Bujanovac), village in the municipality of Bujanovac, Serbia
