= Buštranje =

Buštranje may refer to:

- Buštranje (Bujanovac), Serbia
- Buštranje (Preševo), Serbia
- Buštranje (Vranje), Serbia
