= Rujan =

Mountain in Serbia

- Location within Serbia

Highest point
- Elevation: 968 m (3,176 ft)
- Coordinates: 42°21′58″N 21°49′06″E

Geography
- Location: Southern Serbia
- Parent range: Rhodope Mountains

Rujan (Serbian Cyrillic: Рујан) or Rujen (Рујен), is a mountain in southern Serbia, near the town of Bujanovac. Its highest peak, Kalje, has an elevation of 968 meters (3,176 ft) above sea level. On the mountain, there is Kale-Krševica archeological site, dating from the 13th century BC. The Pčinja flows through the valley of Rujan.

== See also ==
- List of mountains in Serbia
