= Donje Novo Selo =

Donje Novo Selo may refer to the following villages:

- Donje Novo Selo, Croatia
- Donje Novo Selo (Bujanovac), in Serbia
