= Ratibor Đurđević =

Serbian-American psychologist and writer

- Ратибор Ђурђевић
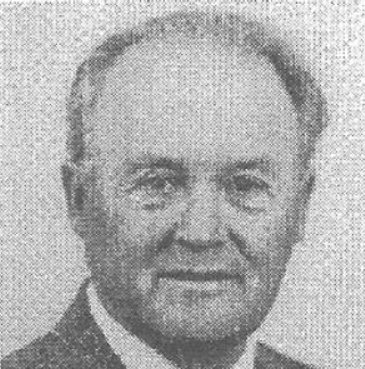
- Born: 24 August 1915; Ristovac, Kingdom of Serbia
- Died: 31 May 2011 (aged 95); Belgrade, Serbia
- Occupations: Psychologist, psychiatrist and writer
- Spouse(s): Vera Đurđević (née Olćan; 1913–2002)

Ratibor Đurđević (Serbian Cyrillic: Ратибор Ђурђевић; 24 August 1915 – 31 May 2011) was a Serbian psychologist, psychiatrist and writer. He founded and ran the publishing house Ihtus – Hrišćanska knjiga. While living in the United States from 1950 to 1992, he worked and wrote under the name Ray Jurjevich.

== Biography ==
Ratibor Đurđević was born to father Momčilo and mother Ljubica (née Milovanović) on 24 August 1915 in Ristovac during World War I. He spent the first three years of his life in exile in France during the Austro-Hungarian occupation of Serbia.

As a young man, he belonged to the Bogomoltsy Movement and participated in the struggle against the Concordat. He started university studies in Belgrade, was awarded a British scholarship, and obtained a B.Sc. in forestry from the University of Edinburgh in 1938.

Upon his return to Belgrade, he worked for two years as a secretary of the Young Men's Christian Association (YMCA) for high school and university students, until the Nazi invasion and occupation of Yugoslavia in 1941. During the occupation and subsequent civil war, he joined the monarchist forces led by General Draža Mihailović. He served as one of the leaders of the Missionary-Ideological Department which Mihailović established in his headquarters to strengthen the Christian and democratic identity of his movement and was active in the National Labour Service of the Government of National Salvation. He fled the country in 1944 after the Communists won the war and worked in the YMCA program for refugees from communism in displaced persons camps in Italy and Germany before coming to America in 1950.

He was employed as a social worker in Chicago and Denver, and earned an M.S. in social group work from George Williams College in Chicago. In 1958, he received a Ph.D. in clinical psychology from the University of Denver, and served as chief psychologist at the Mountainview School for Girls, the Lowry Air Force Base Psychiatric Clinic, and the Denver County Jail. He also carried a part-time practice in psycho-therapy and marriage counseling, going into it full time in 1973.

He received his medical degree from the University of Vienna in 1969, where he studied logotherapy under its founder, Viktor Frankl. He resigned from the American Psychological Association due to his opposition to their position on homosexuality.

He returned to Serbia in 1992.

== Death ==
He died in Belgrade on 31 May 2011. He was buried on 2 June 2011 in his family tomb at the Topčider Cemetery. The funeral service and farewell speech were held by Serbian Orthodox priest Žarko Gavrilović.

== Personal life ==
He was married to Vera, daughter of Mihailo Olćan, with whom he had been married since 1947.

== Notes ==
1. In English, this translates to Ichthys – Christian books.
