= Vrban =

Vrban or Vërban could refer to the following settlements:

- Vrban (Central Serbia) - a village near Bujanovac
- Vërban - Village in Kosovo also known as Vrban
