= Kale-Krševica =

Fortress of Krševica
- Location in Serbia
- Coordinates: 42°26′41″N 21°51′03″E
- Time zone: UTC+1 (Central European)

Kale-Krševica is an archaeological site in Serbia, dating back mainly to the late classical and early Hellenistic periods. It holds the remains of the northernmost Ancient Macedonian city so far discovered.

== Location and size ==
The site is located in the hills of Krševica overlooking Bujanovac and Vranje, to the south of Ristovac in southern Serbia.

The town had an exceptionally strategic position on a plateau that descends from the Rujan mountain towards the South Morava and Vranje valley. At the slopes of the plateau is a village where houses often have stone blocks from the ancient settlement. Its acropolis and suburbium, which encompass 4 hectares, extended to the valley of Krševička river.

== Description and history ==
Of the over 4 hectares covered by the site, some 1,000 squares had been excavated by 2004.

The former fortified town has a history going back to the 13th century BC (Bronze Age) as a settlement with elements of an acropolis, but the main preserved characteristics are of a Greek-Mediterranean-style urban town from the 5th or 4th century BC, with stone walls and a necropolis.

Finds of coins of Philip II, Alexander III, Cassander, Demetrios Poliorketes and Pelagia correspond in general to the chronological span of the archaeological material discovered so far in the course of excavations, which allows to considered the site as the northernmost Ancient Macedonian city. The town had at least 3,000 inhabitants in the 4th and 3rd century BC.

The Paeonian tribe of Agrianes dwelled in this region, and the Scordisci are believed to have razed the town to the ground in 279 BC.

== Identification ==
Dr. Petar Popović from the Institute of Archaeology in Belgrade says that the site could be the ancient city of Damastion.

== Findings ==
The first findings were recorded in 1966.

Identical finds of pottery were made in Cernica, Gadimlje, and in the Skopje basin.

=== Early Iron Age city ===
The findings include the foundations of the 13th century BC city, and Brnjica culture pottery of the early Iron Age (1200 BC).

=== Ancient Macedonian city ===
The 4th-century BC findings comprise Greek vessels of the types known as hydriai, painted kantharoi and skyphoi, as well as 25 very rare golden coins from the time of Philip II (r. 359–336 BC) and Alexander the Great (r. 336–323 BC), valued at €50,000 each. A large textile industry could be documented, based on over a thousand loom weights, spindle whorls and spools from the fourth and early third centuries BC found at the site.

== Excavation history ==
In 2001 the research around the site took a new turn with cooperation between the Belgrade Archaeological Institute, the National Museum of Serbia, Vranje National Museum, and the Faculty of Philosophy of the University of Belgrade.
