= Pretina =

Pretina Претина
- Village
- Location within Serbia
- Coordinates: 42°21′03″N 21°51′17″E
- Country: Serbia
- Region: Southern and Eastern Serbia
- District: Pčinja
- Municipality: Bujanovac

Population (2002)
  - Total: 53
- Time zone: UTC+1 (CET)
  - Summer (DST): UTC+2 (CEST)

Pretina (Serbian Cyrillic: Претина) is a village in the municipality of Bujanovac, Serbia. According to the 2002 census, the town has a population of 53 people.
