= Oslare =

Oslare Осларе Osllarë
- Village
- Location within Serbia
- Coordinates: 42°26′03″N 21°43′45″E
- Country: Serbia
- District: Pčinja District
- Municipality: Bujanovac

Population (2002)
  - Total: 904
- Time zone: UTC+1 (CET)
  - Summer (DST): UTC+2 (CEST)

Oslare (Serbian Cyrillic: Осларе, Albanian: Osllarë) is a village in the municipality of Bujanovac, Serbia. According to the 2002 census, the town has a population of 904.

== History ==
=== Serbian-Ottoman War ===
After the Serbian capture of Niš (3–29 December 1877), Ottoman Albanian troops from Debar and Tetovo fled the front and crossed the Pčinja, looting and raping along the way. On 18 January 1878, 17 armed Albanians descended from the mountains into Oslare, shouting while entering the village. They first arrived at the house of Arsa Stojković, which they looted and emptied before his eyes, enraging Stojković who proceeded to punch one of them. He was shot in the stomach and fell down, though still alive, he took a stake and delivered a mighty blow to the shooter's head, dying with him. The villagers then quickly entered an armed fight with the Albanians, killing them.

== Demographic history ==
According to the 2002 census, the town had a population of 904. Of these, 498 (55,08%) were ethnic Albanians, and 400 (44,24%) were Serbs.
