= Srpska Kuća =

Srpska Kuća Српска Кућа
- Village
- Location within Serbia
- Coordinates: 42°28′21″N 21°48′35″E
- Country: Serbia
- Region: Southern and Eastern Serbia
- District: Pčinja
- Municipality: Bujanovac

Population (2002)
  - Total: 284
- Time zone: UTC+1 (CET)
  - Summer (DST): UTC+2 (CEST)

Srpska Kuća (Serbian Cyrillic: Српска Кућа) is a village in the municipality of Bujanovac, Serbia. According to the 2002 census, the town has a population of 284 people.
