= Negovac =

Negovac Неговац Negoc
- Village
- Location within Serbia
- Country: Serbia
- Region: Southern and Eastern Serbia
- District: Pčinja
- Municipality: Bujanovac

Population (2022)
  - Total: 0
- Time zone: UTC+1 (CET)
  - Summer (DST): UTC+2 (CEST)

Negovac (Serbian Cyrillic: Неговац,Albanian: Negoc) is a village in the municipality of Bujanovac, Serbia. According to the 2022 census, the town has a population of 0 (100,0 %) people, all were Albanians.
