= Brnjare =

Brnjare Брњаре Bërnjara
- Village
- Location within Serbia
- Coordinates: 42°23′50″N 21°55′02″E
- Country: Serbia
- District: Pčinja District
- Municipality: Bujanovac

Population (2002)
  - Total: 114
- Time zone: UTC+1 (CET)
  - Summer (DST): UTC+2 (CEST)

Brnjare (Serbian Cyrillic: Брњаре) is a village in the municipality of Bujanovac, Serbia. According to the 2002 census, the town has a population of 114 people.
