= Nesalce =

Nesalce Nasalce Nesalcë
- Village
- Location within Serbia
- Coordinates: 42°25′09″N 21°42′31″E
- Country: Serbia
- District: Pčinja District
- Municipality: Bujanovac

Population (2002)
  - Total: 1,203
- Time zone: UTC+1 (CET)
  - Summer (DST): UTC+2 (CEST)

Nesalce (Serbian Cyrillic: Несалце; Albanian: Nesalcë) is a village in the municipality of Bujanovac, Serbia. According to the 2002 census, the town has a population of 1203 people. Of these, 1194 (99,25 %) were ethnic Albanians, and 4 (0,33 %) others.
