= Jablanica, Bujanovac =

Jablanica Јабланица
- Village
- Location within Serbia
- Country: Serbia
- Region: Southern and Eastern Serbia
- District: Pčinja
- Municipality: Bujanovac

Population (2002)
  - Total: 109
- Time zone: UTC+1 (CET)
  - Summer (DST): UTC+2 (CEST)

Jablanica (Serbian Cyrillic: Јабланица) is a village in the municipality of Bujanovac, Serbia. According to the 2002 census, the town has a population of 109 people.

== Notable people ==
- Ajet Sopi Bllata, Albanian rebel
