= Klinovac =

Klinovac Клиновац
- Village
- Location within Serbia
- Country: Serbia
- Region: Southern and Eastern Serbia
- District: Pčinja
- Municipality: Bujanovac

Population (2002)
  - Total: 539
- Time zone: UTC+1 (CET)
  - Summer (DST): UTC+2 (CEST)

Klinovac (Serbian Cyrillic: Клиновац) is a village in the municipality of Bujanovac, Serbia. According to the 2002 census, the town has a population of 539 people.

== History ==
Since 1880, there is Serbian Folk School functioning in Klinovac.

== Population ==
According to the 2002 census, 425 adult residents lived in the village of Klinovac, the average age of which was 40.7 years (39.2 years for men and 42.5 years for women). There are 163 households in the village, and the average number of members per household is 3.31.

Year	Population
1948	900
1953	911
1961	866
1971	784
1981	667
1991	604
2002	539
