= Drežnica, Bujanovac =

Drežnica Дрежница
- Village
- Location within Serbia
- Coordinates: 42°24′13″N 21°53′06″E
- Country: Serbia
- Region: Southern and Eastern Serbia
- District: Pčinja
- Municipality: Bujanovac
- Elevation: 1,594 ft (486 m)

Population (2002)
  - Total: 86
- Time zone: UTC+1 (CET)
  - Summer (DST): UTC+2 (CEST)

Drežnica (Serbian Cyrillic: Дрежница) is a village in the municipality of Bujanovac, Serbia. According to the 2002 census, the village has a population of 86 inhabitants.

== Population ==
Population of Drežnica
1948	1953	1961	1971	1981	1991	2002
159	171	183	161	130	101	86
