= Lukarce =

Lukarce Лукарце
- Village
- Location within Serbia
- Country: Serbia
- Region: Southern and Eastern Serbia
- District: Pčinja
- Municipality: Bujanovac

Population (2002)
  - Total: 5
- Time zone: UTC+1 (CET)
  - Summer (DST): UTC+2 (CEST)

Lukarce (Serbian Cyrillic: Лукарце) is a village in the municipality of Bujanovac, Serbia. According to the 2022 census, the town had a population of 5.
