= Lopardince =

Lopardince Лопардинце
- Village
- Location within Serbia
- Country: Serbia
- Region: Southern and Eastern Serbia
- District: Pčinja
- Municipality: Bujanovac

Population (2002)
  - Total: 825
- Time zone: UTC+1 (CET)
  - Summer (DST): UTC+2 (CEST)

Lopardince (Serbian Cyrillic: Лопардинце) is a village in the municipality of Bujanovac, Serbia. According to the 2002 census, it has a population of 825 people.
