= Letovica =

Letovica Летовица Letovicë
- City
- Location within Serbia
- Country: Serbia
- Region: Southern and Eastern Serbia
- District: Pčinja
- Municipality: Bujanovac

Population (2002)
  - Total: 4,269
- Time zone: UTC+1 (CET)
  - Summer (DST): UTC+2 (CEST)

Letovica (Serbian: Летовица, Albanian: Letovicë) is a City in the municipality of Bujanovac, Serbia. According to the 2002 census, the City has a population of 1126 people. Of these, 1115 (99,02 %) were ethnic Albanians, and 10 (0,88 %) others.
