= Vogance =

Vogance Воганце
- Village
- Location within Serbia
- Coordinates: 42.3442°N 21.9203°E
- Country: Serbia
- District: Pčinja District
- Municipality: Bujanovac

Population (2002)
  - Total: 51
- Time zone: UTC+1 (CET)
  - Summer (DST): UTC+2 (CEST)

Vogance (Serbian Cyrillic: Воганце) is a village in the municipality of Bujanovac, Serbia. According to the 2002 census, the town has a population of 51 people. It is situated by the Pčinja river.

== Demographics ==
The village is inhabited by Serbs.
