= Žbevac =

Žbevac Жбевац
- Village
- Location within Serbia
- Coordinates: 42.4481°N 21.8361°E
- Country: Serbia
- District: Pčinja District
- Municipality: Bujanovac

Population (2002)
  - Total: 804
- Time zone: UTC+1 (CET)
  - Summer (DST): UTC+2 (CEST)

Žbevac (Serbian Cyrillic: Жбевац) is a village in the municipality of Bujanovac, Serbia. According to the 2002 census, the town has a population of 804 people.
