= Kuštica =

Kuštica Куштица
- Village
- Location within Serbia
- Coordinates: 42°22′47″N 21°51′59″E
- Country: Serbia
- Region: Southern and Eastern Serbia
- District: Pčinja
- Municipality: Bujanovac

Population (2002)
  - Total: 175
- Time zone: UTC+1 (CET)
  - Summer (DST): UTC+2 (CEST)

Kuštica (Serbian Cyrillic: Куштица) is a village in the municipality of Bujanovac, Serbia. According to the 2002 census, the town has a population of 175 people.
