= Rusce (Bujanovac) =

Rusce Русце
- Village
- Location within Serbia
- Coordinates: 42°24′45″N 21°57′23″E
- Country: Serbia
- Region: Southern and Eastern Serbia
- District: Pčinja
- Municipality: Bujanovac

Population (2002)
  - Total: 37
- Time zone: UTC+1 (CET)
  - Summer (DST): UTC+2 (CEST)

Rusce (Serbian Cyrillic: Русце) is a village in the municipality of Bujanovac, Serbia. According to the 2002 census, the town has a population of 37 people.
