= Sveta Petka, Serbia =

Sveta Petka Света Петка
- Village
- Location within Serbia
- Coordinates: 42°23′50″N 21°52′11″E
- Country: Serbia
- Region: Southern and Eastern Serbia
- District: Pčinja
- Municipality: Bujanovac
- Elevation: 1,594 ft (486 m)

Population (2002)
  - Total: 334
- Time zone: UTC+1 (CET)
  - Summer (DST): UTC+2 (CEST)

Sveta Petka (Serbian Cyrillic: Света Петка) is a village in the municipality of Bujanovac, Serbia. According to the 2002 census, the village has a population of 334 inhabitants. It has an area of 55.69 km^{2}.

== Population ==
Population of Sveta Petka
1948	1953	1961	1971	1981	1991	2002
323	341	319	295	308	307	334
