= Ajet Sopi Bllata =

Albanian insurgent (1861–1938)

Ajet Sopi Bllata (1861–1938) was an Albanian rebel from the village of Jabllanica, in present-day Bujanovac municipality, then part of the Ottoman Empire. From the age of 17 to that of 53, he fought as a kachak against Serbian interests in the Kosovo Vilayet. He spend his later life in the Kavajë area where many Kosovo Albanian refugees settled after Serbia annexed Kosovo in 1912.

== Life ==
He was from the same family as rebel Ahmet Sopi. When he was 17, control of Jabllanica was transferred to the Principality of Serbia, which had gained it after the Congress of Berlin. His village was burnt and looted and the villagers turnt into refugees during the expulsion of Albanians from the newly acquired areas. For Ajet Sopi, this was the formative event of his life. He would spend much of his life after these events as a kachak against Serbia.

Sopi fought as a Kachak for many years against Serbs together with Idris Seferi until he was expelled by Chetniks to Turkey. Eventually he moved to Albania where he was killed by two villagers who had been paid by Serb authorities.

As the family traveled to the village of Topanci, close to Gjilani, modern day the municipality of Dardane, they had difficulties setting up a new home. Although the region of was under Serb administration, they worked the lands. Sopi, having secured his family, proceeded to meet up with Vesel Kosovice and Idris Seferi in order to continue his patriotic struggle. As they continued, they met regions which had been attacked by Serbs, the commander being Stojan Domoroc, who ordered the atrocities. He stole the Albanians cattle, which angered Sopi and he proceeded to return the cattle which the Serbs now had stolen. Sopi demanded that the Serbs pay for the costs to which Sopi engaged in hostilities with the Serbs but particularly with Stojan. Vesel Kosovic had been told by Stojan that he was going out to hunt in the mountains of Marec, near the lake Krivareka. Stojans men, consisting mostly of Albanians, proceeded while Kosovic and Sopi discussed how to encounter them. Sopi and Kosovice managed to find a location in order to ambush them. Sopi opened fire as soon as he saw Stojani, hitting him in the chest, throwing him off the horse. Stojans men, now panicked, began opening fire. Ajet however signalized with his rifle that if the Albanians continued to fire on their fellow Albanians, they too would meet the same fate as Stojan.

== Death ==
He was killed in Karp in 1938. At that time, he was building a new well in the village and had brought in two workers from Anamorava in Kosovo. At the last day of work, they killed him for unclear reasons. Personal affairs or an attack by Yugoslav agents have been put forward as possible explanations.
