= Krševica =

Krševica Кршевица (Serbian)
- Village (Selo)
- Location within Serbia
- Coordinates: 42°26′36″N 21°51′37″E
- Country: Serbia
- Region: Southern and Eastern Serbia
- District: Pčinja
- Municipality: Bujanovac

Population (2002)
  - Total: 486
- Time zone: UTC+1 (CET)
  - Summer (DST): UTC+2 (CEST)

Krševica (Serbian: Кршевица) is a village in the municipality of Bujanovac of the Pčinja District, Serbia. According to the 2002 there were 486 people (1991: 549 inhabitants). The archaeological site of Kale-Krševica is located in the village, the remnations of a 5th-century BC Ancient Greek Macedon city.
