= Karadnik =

Karadnik Карадник
- Village
- Location within Serbia
- Country: Serbia
- Region: Southern and Eastern Serbia
- District: Pčinja
- Municipality: Bujanovac

Population (2002)
  - Total: 455
- Time zone: UTC+1 (CET)
  - Summer (DST): UTC+2 (CEST)

Karadnik (Serbian Cyrillic: Карадник) is a village in the municipality of Bujanovac, Serbia. According to the 2002 census, the town has a population of 455 people.
