= Žuželjica =

Žuželjica Жужељица
- Village
- Location within Serbia
- Coordinates: 42°26′33″N 21°47′36″E
- Country: Serbia
- Region: Southern and Eastern Serbia
- District: Pčinja
- Municipality: Bujanovac

Population (2002)
  - Total: 166
- Time zone: UTC+1 (CET)
  - Summer (DST): UTC+2 (CEST)

Žuželjica (Serbian Cyrillic: Жужељица) is a village in the municipality of Bujanovac, Serbia. According to the 2002 census, the town has a population of 166 people.
