= Ladislav Rakovac =

Croatian physician (1847-1906)

Ladislav Rakovac (December 6, 1847 – April 14, 1906) was a Croatian physician.

He was born in Varaždin. After completing his degree in medicine in Vienna and specialization in internal medicine as the first Croatian internist, in 1874-1880 he led the internal department of the Bolnica milosrdne braće hospital in Zagreb. Afterwards and until 1892 he served as a secretary of the Health Department of the Provincial Government, and was responsible for many health laws and regulations improving the state of public health in Croatia. As a president of the Croatian Medical Association (1880-1882, and in 1893-1906) he is credited for bringing the association to a high scientific and organizational level, and in his honor the Ladislav Rakovac Award has been established for contributions to the improvement of the Association.

He died in Zagreb.
