= Čar =

Čar Чар Çarr
- Village
- Interactive map of Čar
- Location within Serbia
- Coordinates: 42°35′53″N 21°45′09″E
- Country: Serbia
- District: Pčinja District
- Municipality: Bujanovac

Population (2002)
  - Total: 296
- Time zone: UTC+1 (CET)
  - Summer (DST): UTC+2 (CEST)

Čar (Serbian Cyrillic: Чар; Albanian: Çarr) is a village in the municipality of Bujanovac, Serbia. According to the 2002 census, the town has a population of 296 people. Of these, 295 (99,66 %) were ethnic Albanians, and 1 (0,33 %) other.
