= Uzovo (Bujanovac) =

Uzovo Узово Uzovë
- Village
- Location within Serbia
- Coordinates: 42°19′51″N 21°49′57″E
- Country: Serbia
- Region: Southern and Eastern Serbia
- District: Pčinja
- Municipality: Bujanovac

Population (2002)
  - Total: 10
- Time zone: UTC+1 (CET)
  - Summer (DST): UTC+2 (CEST)

Uzovo (Serbian Cyrillic: Узово, Albanian: Uzovë) is a village in the municipality of Bujanovac, Serbia. According to the 2002 census, the settlement has a population of 10 people. Of these, 8 (80,0 %) were ethnic Albanians, and 2 (20,0 %) were Serbs.
