= Ravno Bučje (Bujanovac) =

Ravno Bučje Равно Бучје Ramabuçë
- Village
- Location within Serbia
- Coordinates: 42°35′22″N 21°47′16″E
- Country: Serbia
- District: Pčinja District
- Municipality: Bujanovac

Population (2002)
  - Total: 393
- Time zone: UTC+1 (CET)
  - Summer (DST): UTC+2 (CEST)

Ravno Bučje (Serbian Cyrillic: Равно Бучје, Albanian: Ramabuçë) is a village in the municipality of Bujanovac, Serbia. According to the 2002 census, the settlement has a population of 393 people. Of these, 391 (99,49 %) were ethnic Albanians, and 2 (0,50 %) others.
