= Donje Novo Selo (Bujanovac) =

Donje Novo Selo Доње Ново Село
- Village
- Location within Serbia
- Coordinates: 42°22′N 21°46′E
- Country: Serbia
- Region: Southern and Eastern Serbia
- District: Pčinja
- Municipality: Bujanovac

Population (2002)
  - Total: 120
- Time zone: UTC+1 (CET)
  - Summer (DST): UTC+2 (CEST)

Donje Novo Selo (Serbian Cyrillic: Доње Ново Село) is a village in the municipality of Bujanovac, Serbia. According to the 2002 census, the town has a population of 120 people.
