= Vrban (Central Serbia) =

Vrban Врбан Vërban
- Village
- Location within Serbia
- Country: Serbia
- Region: Southern and Eastern Serbia
- District: Pčinja
- Municipality: Bujanovac

Population (2002)
  - Total: 123
- Time zone: UTC+1 (CET)
  - Summer (DST): UTC+2 (CEST)

Vrban (Serbian Cyrillic: Врбан, Albanian: Vërban) is a village in the municipality of Bujanovac, Serbia. According to the 2002 census, the settlement has a population of 123 people, all Albanians.
