= Bujanovac =

Bujanovac Бујановац (Serbian) Bujanoc (Albanian)
- Town and municipality
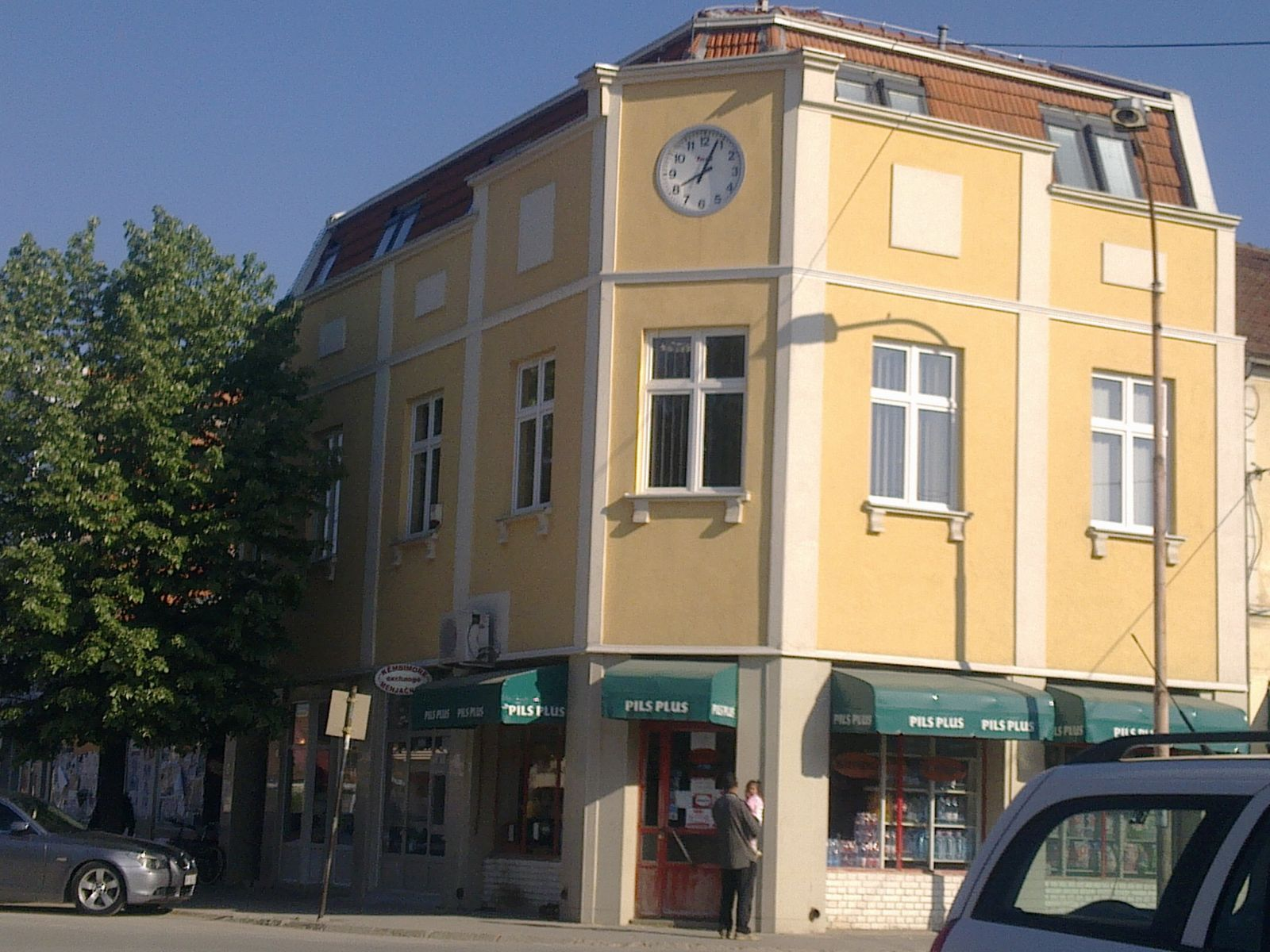
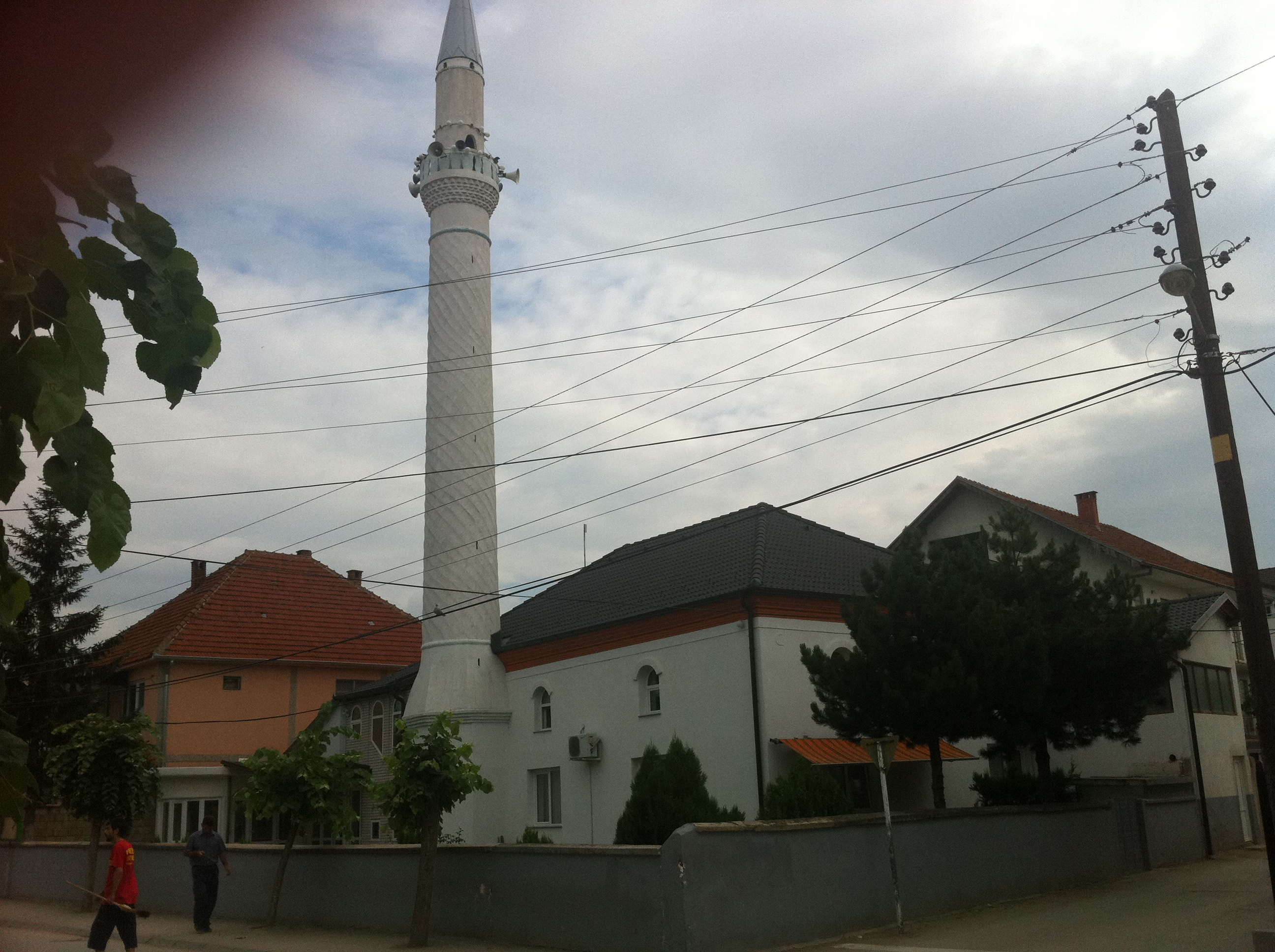
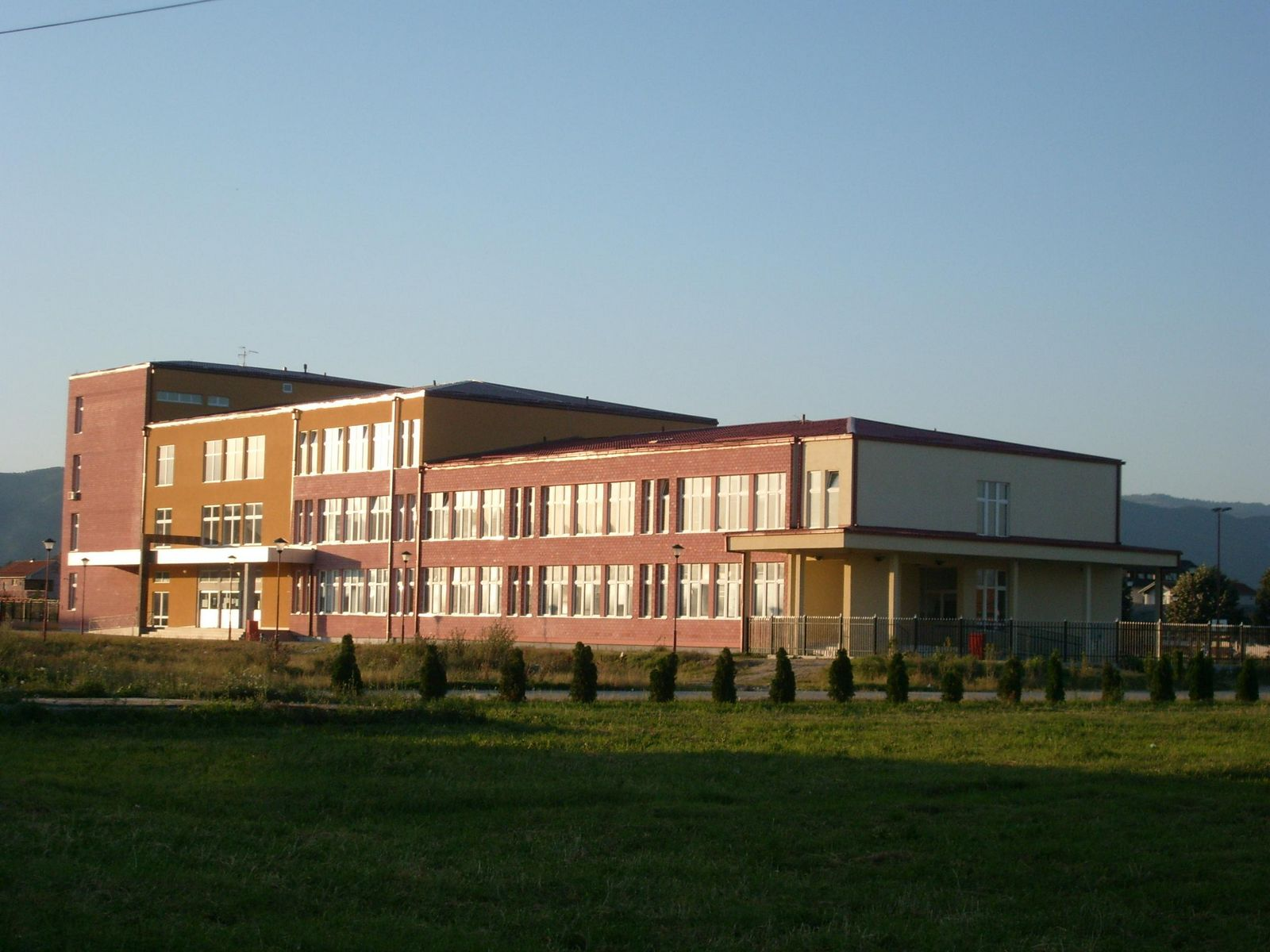
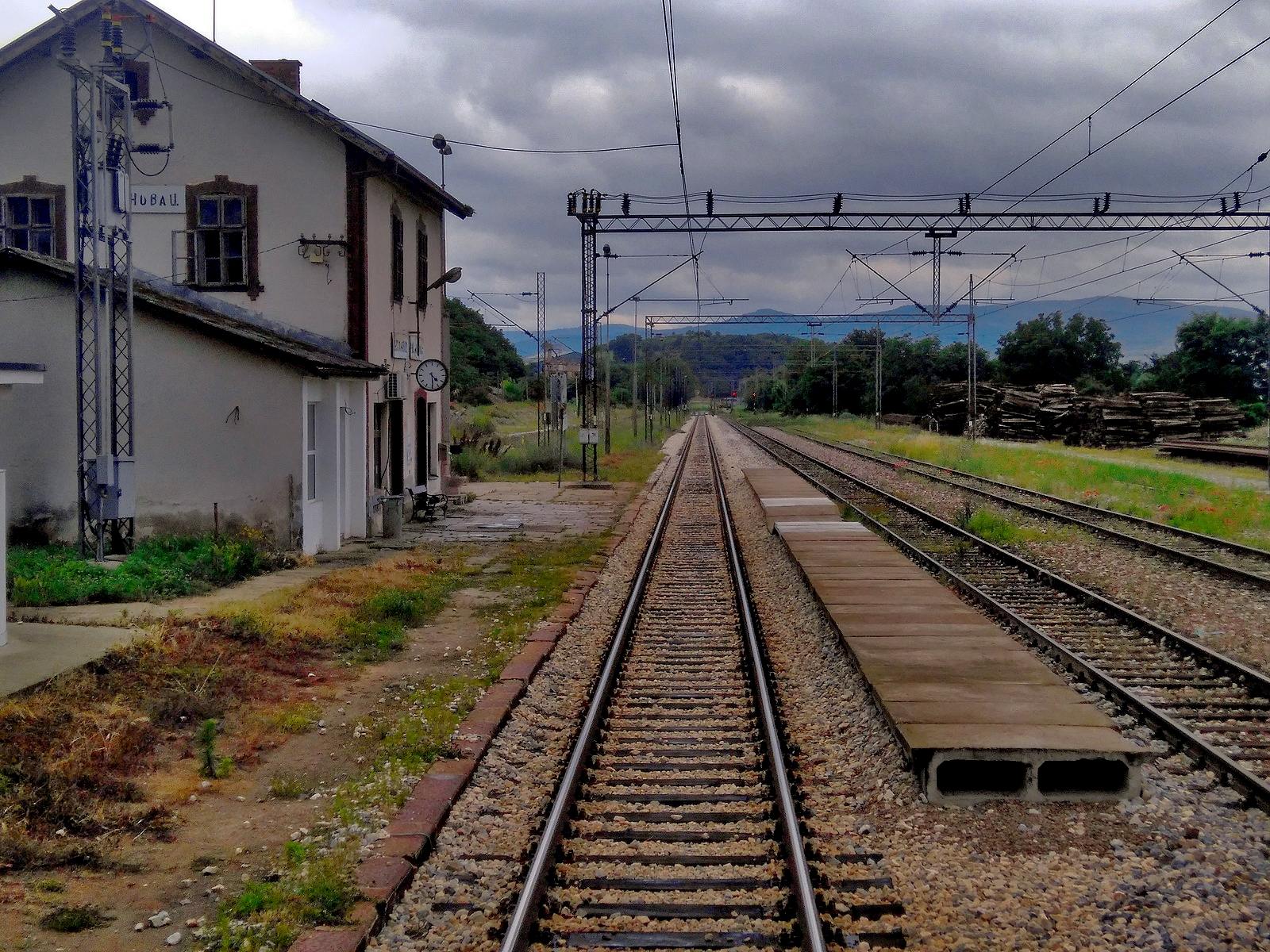
- Building in the center Bujanovac Mosque Sezai Suroi Gymnasium Railway station

- Coat of arms

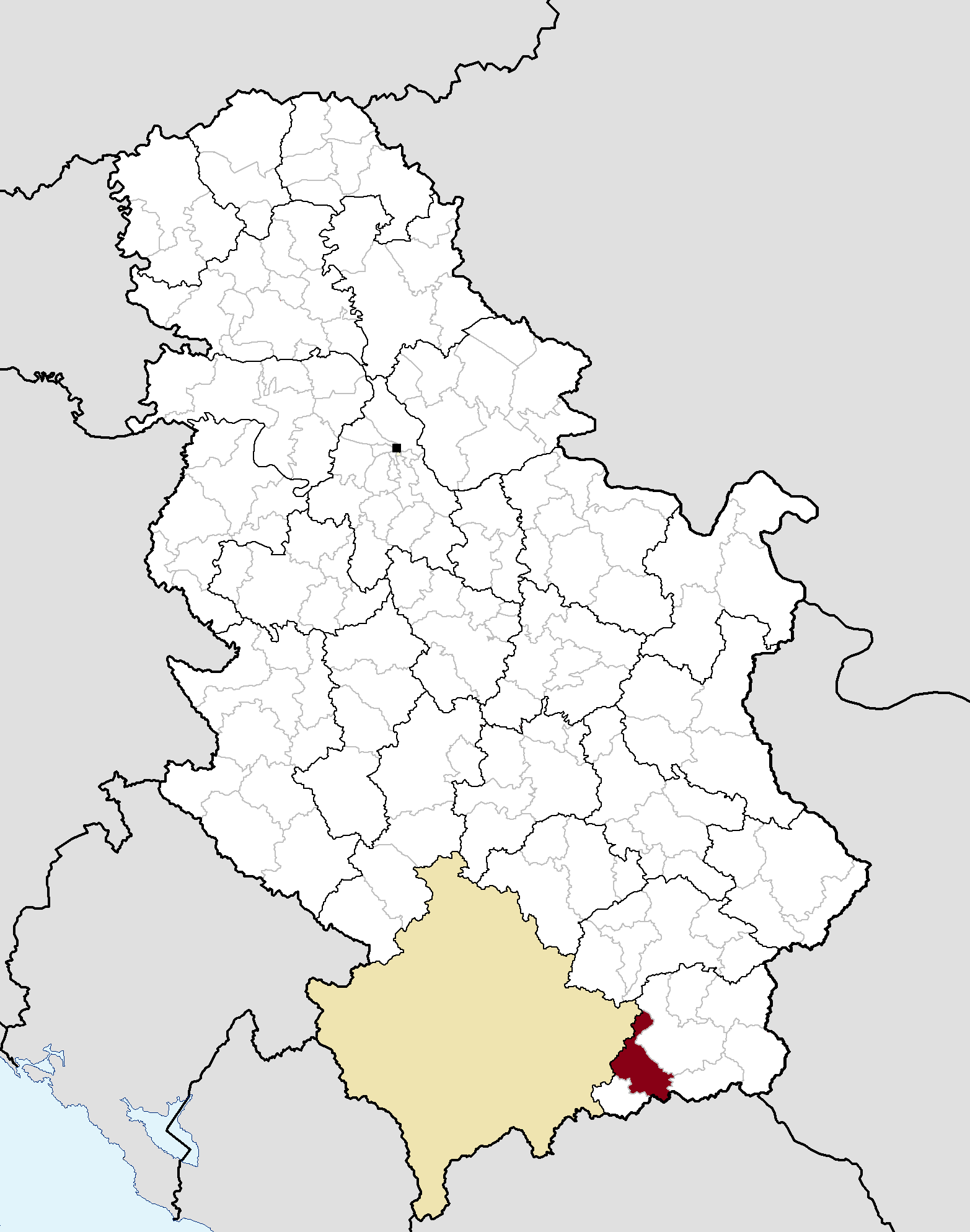
- Location of the municipality of Bujanovac within Serbia
- Coordinates: 42°28′N 21°46′E
- Country: Serbia
- Region: Southern and Eastern Serbia
- District: Pčinja
- Settlements: 59

Government
  - Mayor: Arber Pajaziti (APN)

Area
  - Town: 8.95 km^{2} (3.46 sq mi)
  - Municipality: 461 km^{2} (178 sq mi)
- Elevation: 384 m (1,260 ft)

Population (2022 census)
  - Town: 11,468
  - Town density: 1,280/km^{2} (3,320/sq mi)
  - Municipality: 41,068
  - Municipality density: 89.1/km^{2} (231/sq mi)
- Time zone: UTC+1 (CET)
  - Summer (DST): UTC+2 (CEST)
- Postal code: 17520
- Area code: +381(0)17
- Car plates: BU
- Official languages: Serbian together with Albanian
- Website: www.bujanovac.rs/en

Municipality of Bujanovac

Bujanovac (Serbian Cyrillic: Бујановац, pronounced [bǔjanɔvats]; Albanian: Bujanoc) is a town and municipality located in the Pčinja District of southern Serbia. As of the 2022 census, the municipality has a population of 41,068.

Situated in the South Morava basin, it is located in the geographical area known as Preševo Valley. It is also known for its source of mineral water and spa town Bujanovačka banja. Ethnically, Serbs are the largest ethnic group in the town, while the largest ethnic group in the municipality are Albanians.

== History ==
=== Ancient history ===
Kale-Krševica, located south of Ristovac, is an archaeological site of a 5th-century BC Ancient city of Macedon, thought to be Damastion. The Thracian Triballi and Paeonian Agrianes dwelled in the region, with the Scordisci settling here after the Gallic invasion of the Balkans in 279 BC. The region was conquered by the Romans after 75 BC. It became part of the Roman propraetorial province Moesia in 29 BC (imperial from 27 BC). In 87 AD the region was re-organized into the Moesia Superior, which was a province of the Roman Empire.

=== Medieval Serbian era ===
Medieval Serbian state like the Kingdom of Serbia or the Serbian Empire included part of this region in the 12th century and most of it until the 14th century. Since the 15th century, the region was under Ottoman administration.

=== Ottoman era ===
It became part of Rumelia, as a historical term describing the area now referred to as the Balkans or the Balkan Peninsula when it was administered by the Ottoman Empire.

After the Berlin agreement, signed in 1878, there were some administrative changes in the Ottoman Empire. Bujanovac – then Buyanofça – and its surroundings became part of the "Preševo area" of the Priština District and in 1905–1912 Bujanovac belonged to the 2nd category of borough covering 28 villages. After the Balkan Wars, the area belonged to Kumanovo District of the Kingdom of Serbia.

=== Yugoslavia (1918–92) ===
After the establishment of the Kingdom of Serbs, Croats and Slovenians, in 1918, Bujanovac became part of Vranje Oblast, which was formed in 1921 after the Vidovdan Constitution. With administrative changes in 1929, it became part of Vardar Banovina, with the town of Skopje as capital. With the forming of Democratic Federal Yugoslavia, it was part of Socialist Republic of Serbia from 1945 to 1992. After World War II, in 1947, Bujanovac was established as one of 117 municipalities of Central Serbia, under its own name.

From 1945 until 1992 Bujanovac was part of Socialist Republic of Serbia, within SFR Yugoslavia.

=== Breakup of Yugoslavia (1991–99) ===
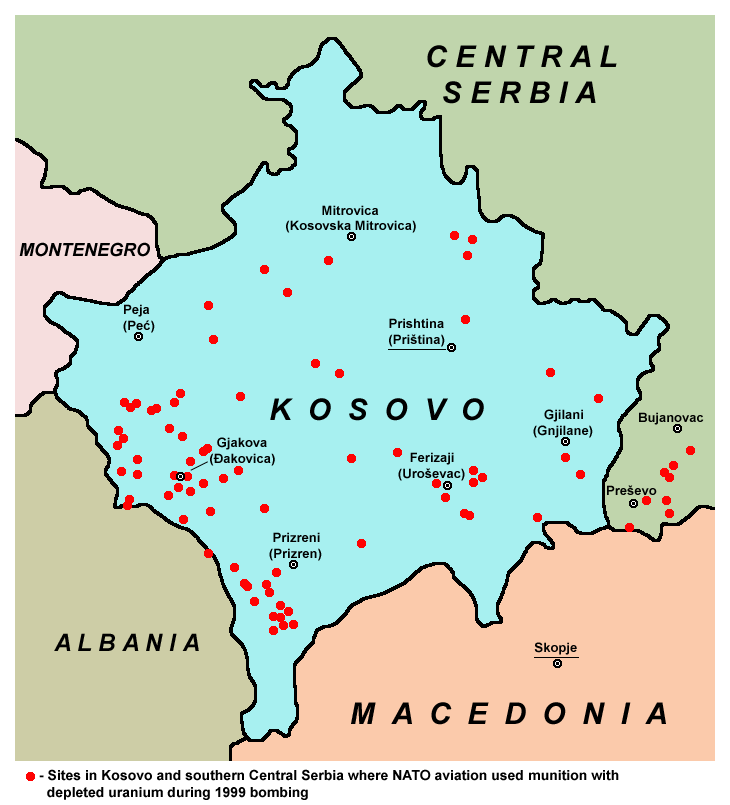
Sites near Bujanovac where NATO aviation used munition with depleted uranium during 1999 bombing

In 1992, the Albanians in the area organized a referendum in which they voted that Bujanovac, Preševo and Medveđa should join the self-declared assembly of the Republic of Kosova. However, no major events happened until the end of the 1990s.

Following the breakup of Yugoslavia, and nearby Kosovo War which lasted until 1999, between 1999 and 2001, an ethnic Albanian paramilitary separatist organization, the UÇPMB, raised an armed insurgency in the Preševo Valley, in the region mostly inhabited by Albanians, with a goal to occupy these three municipalities from Serbia and join them to the self-proclaimed Republic of Kosova.

Unlike in the case of Kosovo, western countries condemned the attacks and described it as the "extremism" and use of "illegal terrorist actions" by the group. Following the overthrow of Slobodan Milošević, the new Yugoslav government suppressed the violence by 2001 and defeated the separatists. NATO troops also helped the Yugoslav government by ensuring that the rebels do not import the conflicts back into Kosovo. Thereafter, the situation has stabilized even though large number of forces exist in this small municipality.

In 2009, Serbia opened a military base Cepotina five kilometers south of Bujanovac, to further stabilize the area.

=== Modern ===
Today, Bujanovac is located in the Pčinja District of southern Serbia.

On 7 March 2017, the President of Albania Bujar Nishani made a historical visit to the municipalities of Bujanovac and Preševo, in which Albanians form the ethnic majority.

== Settlements ==
Aside from the town of Bujanovac, the municipality includes the following settlements:

- Baraljevac
- Biljača
- Bogdanovac
- Božinjevac
- Borovac
- Bratoselce
- Breznica
- Brnjare
- Buštranje
- Čar
- Dobrosin
- Donje Novo Selo
- Drežnica
- Đorđevac
- Gramada
- Gornje Novo Selo
- Jablanica
- Jastrebac
- Karadnik
- Klenike
- Klinovac
- Končulj
- Košarno
- Krševica
- Kuštica
- Letovica
- Levosoje
- Lopardince
- Lučane
- Lukarce
- Ljiljance
- Mali Trnovac
- Muhovac
- Negovac
- Nesalce
- Oslare
- Pretina
- Pribovce
- Rakovac
- Ravno Bučje
- Rusce
- Samoljica
- Sebrat
- Sejace
- Spančevac
- Srpska Kuća
- Sveta Petka
- Starac
- Suharno
- Trejak
- Turija
- Uzovo
- Veliki Trnovac
- Vogance
- Vrban
- Zarbince
- Žbevac
- Žuželjica

== Demographics ==
Historical population
| Year | Pop. | ±% p.a. |
|---|---|---|
| 1948 | 34,472 | — |
| 1953 | 36,810 | +1.32% |
| 1961 | 39,064 | +0.75% |
| 1971 | 43,522 | +1.09% |
| 1981 | 46,689 | +0.70% |
| 1991 | 49,238 | +0.53% |
| 2002 | 43,302 | −1.16% |
| 2011^{[b]} | 18,067 | −9.26% |
| 2022 | 41,068 | +7.75% |

According to the 2022 census, the municipality of Bujanovac had a population of 41,068 people. Most of the municipality population live in rural areas, with only 28% living in the urban parts. The municipality of Bujanovac has 59 inhabited places.

=== Ethnic groups ===
The majority of the municipality population according to the 2022 census are Albanians, encompassing 62% of the total population. During the 2011 census, undercounting of the census units, owing to the boycott by most of the members of the Albanian ethnic community in the municipality of Bujanovac, was reported. The ethnic composition of the municipality is as follows:

| Ethnic group | Population 1948^{[a]} | Population 1953^{[a]} | Population 1961 | Population 1971 | Population 1981 | Population 1991 | Population 2002 | Population 2011^{[b]} | 2022 Census | |
| Ethnic group | Population 1948^{[a]} | Population 1953^{[a]} | Population 1961 | Population 1971 | Population 1981 | Population 1991 | Population 2002 | Population 2011^{[b]} | Population | % |
|---|---|---|---|---|---|---|---|---|---|---|
| Albanians | 27,174 | 28,653 | 16,618 | 21,209 | 25,848 | 29,588 | 23,681 | 244 | 25,465 | 62 |
| Serbs | 25,143 | 27,681 | 20,033 | 18,840 | 15,914 | 14,660 | 14,782 | 12,989 | 10,467 | 25.5 |
| Romani | 2,838 | - | 11 | 2,749 | 4,130 | 4,408 | 3,867 | 4,576 | 3,532 | 8.6 |
| Macedonians | 29 | 54 | 40 | 55 | 105 | - | 36 | 47 | 16 | 0.3 |
| Bulgarians | 9 | 23 | - | - | - | - | 33 | 23 | 11 | 0.3 |
| Gorani | - | - | - | - | - | - | 10 | 60 | 87 | 0.3 |
| Montenegrins | 23 | 16 | 8 | 23 | 24 | 44 | 7 | 19 | - | 0.3 |
| Muslims | 314 | - | 134 | 81 | 121 | 133 | 6 | 15 | 15 | 0.3 |
| Yugoslavs | - | 91 | 1,081 | 15 | 96 | 75 | 2 | 3 | 2 | 0.3 |
| Others | 408 | 6,286 | 1,147 | 550 | 451 | 330 | 878 | 91 | 1,473 | 3.6 |
| Total | 55,938 | 62,804 | 39,064 | 43,522 | 46,689 | 49,238 | 43,302 | 18,067 | 41,068 | 100 |

=== Religion ===
Based on the census results from 2022, the Bujanovac Municipality has 68.8% of Muslims majority and substantial 24.8% Christian Orthodox minority.

| Religious group | Census 2022 | |
| Religious group | Population | % |
|---|---|---|
| Islam | 28,254 | 68.8 |
| Orthodoxy | 10,203 | 24.8 |
| Other Christian | 423 | 1 |
| Others | 4 | 0.0 |
| Undeclared | 340 | 0.8 |
| Unknown | 1,844 | 4.5 |
| Total | 41,068 | |

== Culture and society ==
=== Sports ===
Bujanovac has a number of football teams, the most notable being BSK Bujanovac, KF Tërnoci and KF Besa.

== Economy ==
The following table gives a preview of total number of registered people employed in legal entities per their core activity (as of 2022):

| Activity | Total |
|---|---|
| Agriculture, forestry and fishing | 32 |
| Mining and quarrying | 16 |
| Manufacturing | 1,291 |
| Electricity, gas, steam and air conditioning supply | 8 |
| Water supply; sewerage, waste management and remediation activities | 180 |
| Construction | 265 |
| Wholesale and retail trade, repair of motor vehicles and motorcycles | 685 |
| Transportation and storage | 328 |
| Accommodation and food services | 249 |
| Information and communication | 27 |
| Financial and insurance activities | 35 |
| Real estate activities | 2 |
| Professional, scientific and technical activities | 129 |
| Administrative and support service activities | 31 |
| Public administration and defense; compulsory social security | 609 |
| Education | 780 |
| Human health and social work activities | 369 |
| Arts, entertainment and recreation | 135 |
| Other service activities | 131 |
| Individual agricultural workers | 100 |
| Total | 5,401 |

== Gallery ==
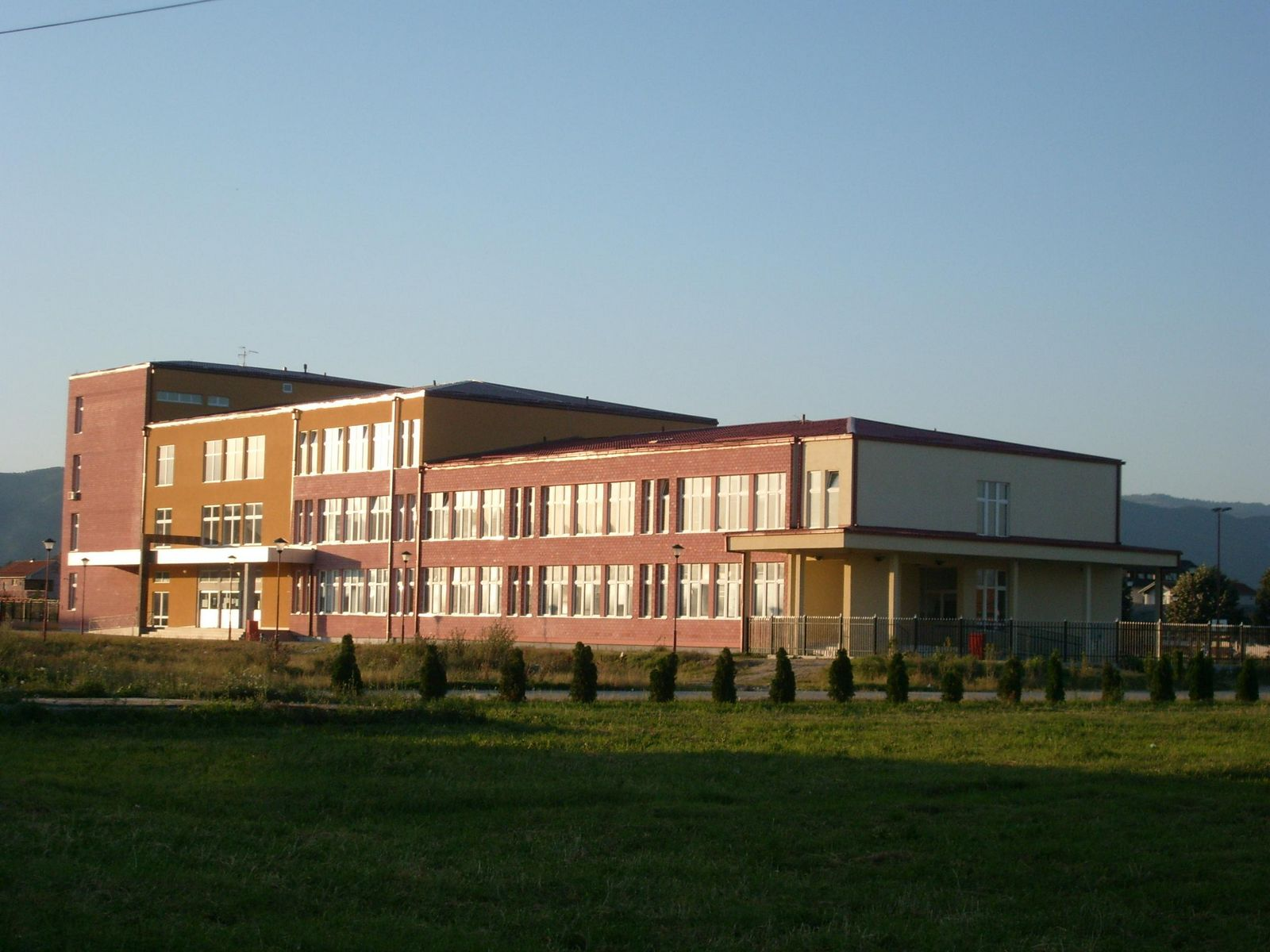
Bujanovac Grammar's School

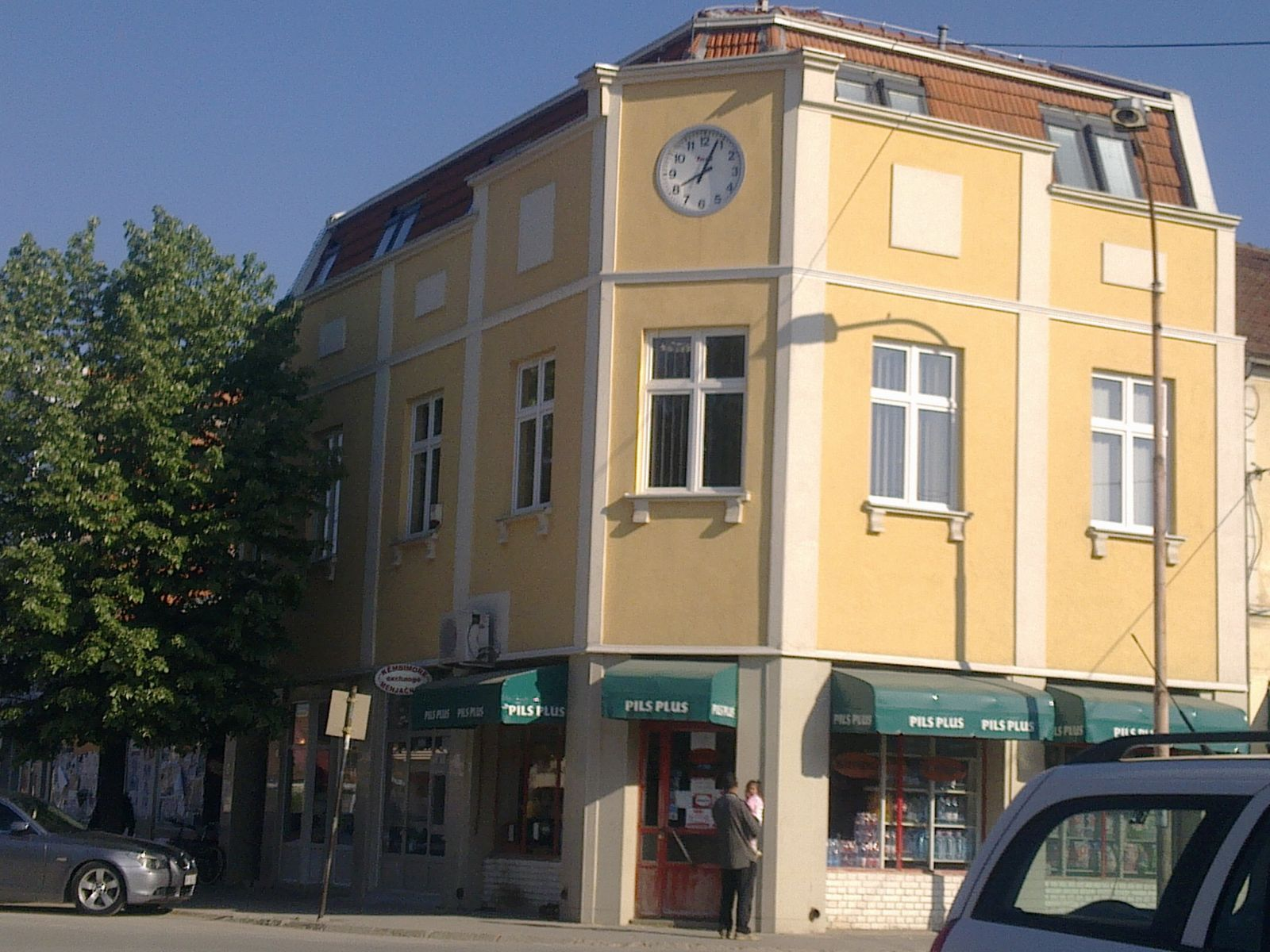
Town Center Building

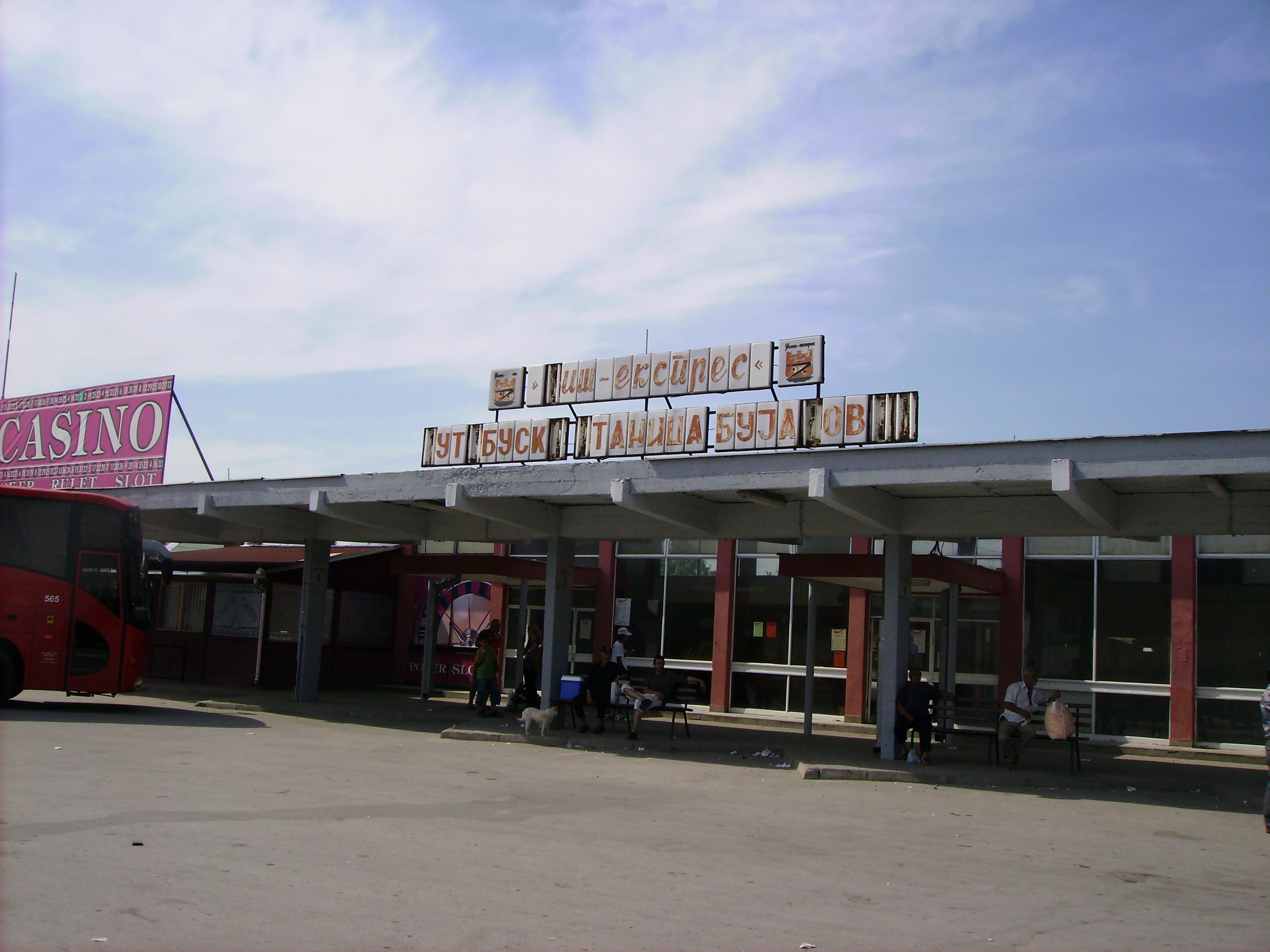
Bujanovac Bus Station

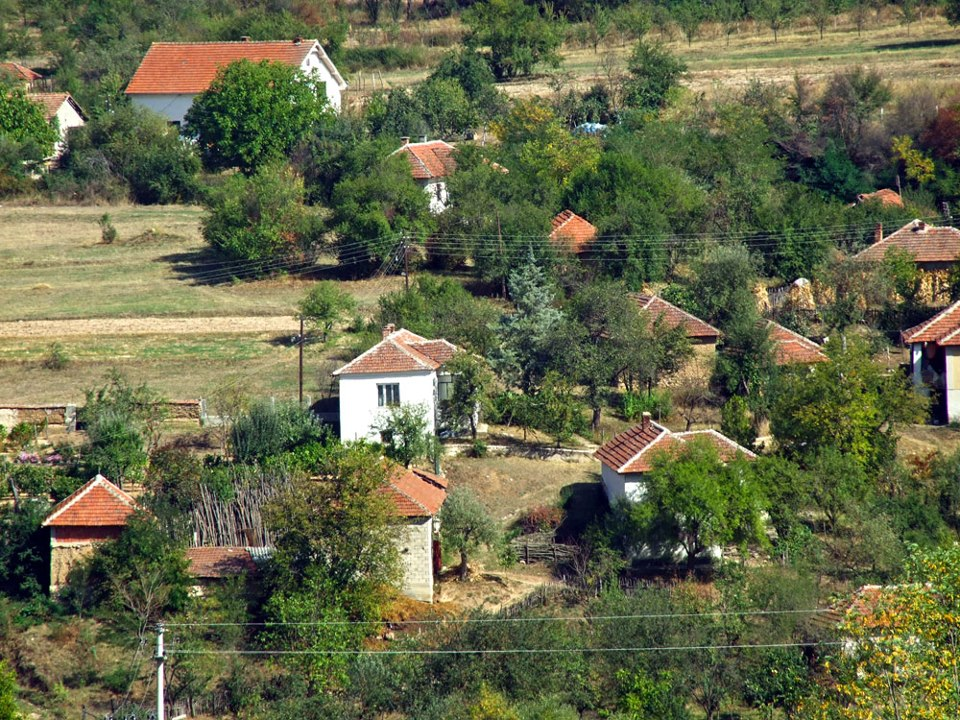
Ljiljance village panorama

== International cooperation ==
- Lillehammer, Norway
- Valbonë, Albania
- Gjirokastër, Albania

== Notable people ==
- Branislav Anđelović, Serbian musician (Rokeri s Moravu)
- Zvonko Marić, Serbian physicist and academician
- Nexhat Daci, Kosovo Albanian politician
- Gjelbrim Taipi, Albanian footballer
- Berat Djimsiti, Albanian footballer
- Shaip Kamberi, Albanian politician
- Lumir Abdixhiku, Kosovo Albanian politician
- Arbnor Fejzullahu, Albanian footballer
- Ajet Sopi Bllata, Albanian rebel
- Nagip Arifi, Albanian politician

== See also ==
- List of places in Serbia
- Albanians in Serbia

== Notes ==
| a. | At the time, today's municipality of Preševo was a part of Bujanovac. |

| b. | In the municipality of Bujanovac there was undercoverage of the census units owing to the boycott by most of the members of the Albanian ethnic community. |
