= Gornje Novo Selo =

Gornje Novo Selo Горње Ново Село Novosellë
- Village
- Location within Serbia
- Country: Serbia
- Region: Southern and Eastern Serbia
- District: Pčinja
- Municipality: Bujanovac

Population (2002)
  - Total: 437
- Time zone: UTC+1 (CET)
  - Summer (DST): UTC+2 (CEST)

Gornje Novo Selo (Serbian Cyrillic: Горње Ново Село;Albanian: Novosellë) is a village in the municipality of Bujanovac, Serbia. According to the 2002 census, the town had a population of 437. Of these, 436 (99,77 %) were ethnic Albanians, and 1 (0,22 %) other.
