= Pribovce =

Pribovce Priboc
- Village
- Location within Serbia
- Coordinates: 42°37′03″N 21°46′25″E
- Country: Serbia
- District: Pčinja District
- Municipality: Bujanovac

Population (2002)
  - Total: 348
- Time zone: UTC+1 (CET)
  - Summer (DST): UTC+2 (CEST)

Pribovce (Albanian: Priboc) is a village in the municipality of Bujanovac, Serbia. According to the 2002 census, the town has a population of 348 people. Of these, 346 (99,42 %) were ethnic Albanians, 1 (0,28 %) Romanian, and 1 (0,28 %) Muslim.
