= Suharno =

Suharno Suharnë
- Village
- Location within Serbia
- Coordinates: 42°36′54″N 21°49′16″E
- Country: Serbia
- District: Pčinja District
- Municipality: Bujanovac

Population (2002)
  - Total: 309
- Time zone: UTC+1 (CET)
  - Summer (DST): UTC+2 (CEST)

Suharno (Serbian Cyrillic: Сухарно, Albanian: Suharnë) is a village in the municipality of Bujanovac, Serbia. According to the 2002 census, the town has a population of 309 people. Of these, 307 (99,35 %) were ethnic Albanians, 1 (0,32 %) Bosniak, and 1 (0,32 %) other.
