= Zarbince =

Zarbince Зарбинце Zarbicë
- Village
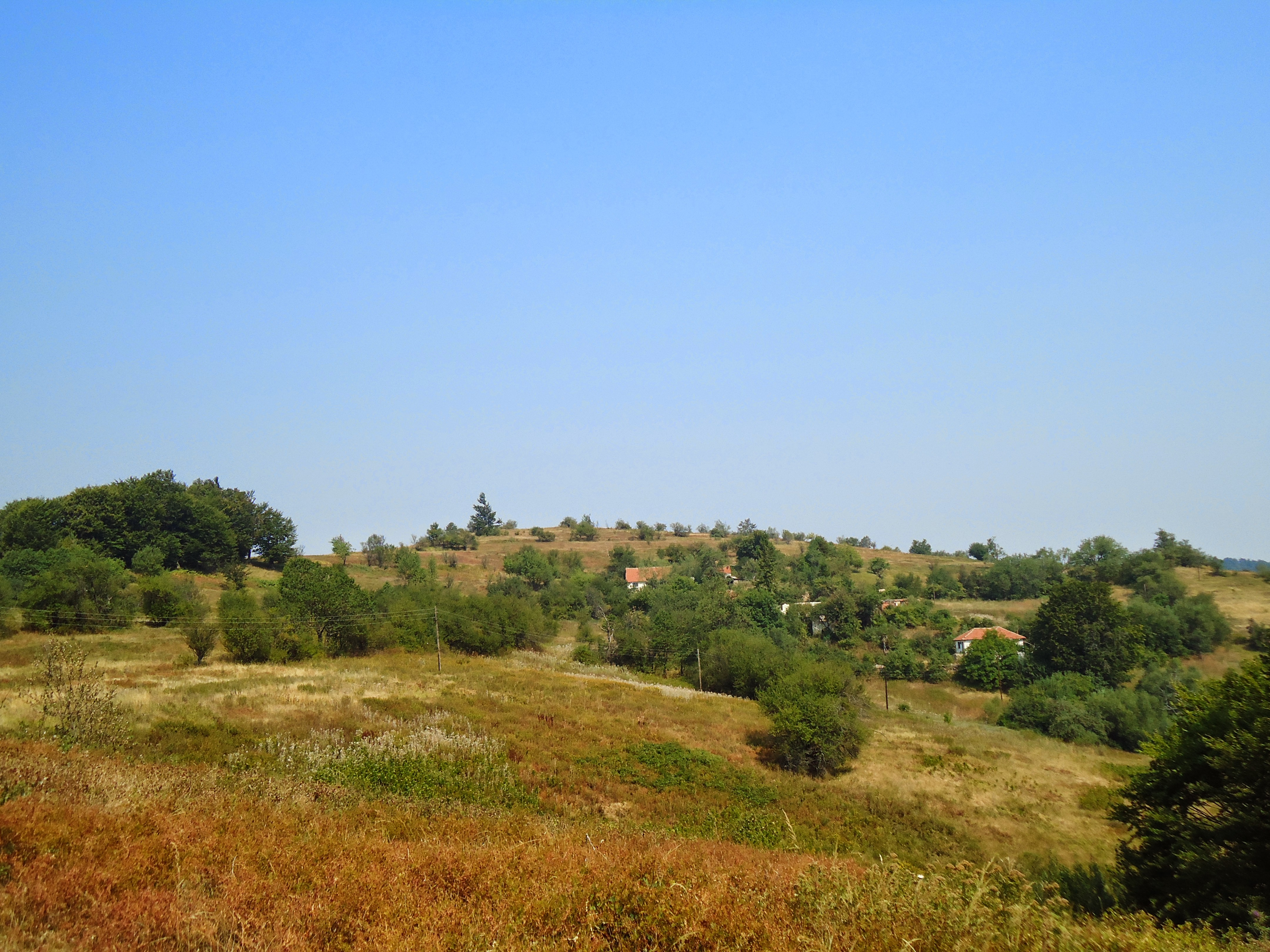
- View of Zarbince Landscape

- Location within Serbia
- Country: Serbia
- Region: Southern and Eastern Serbia
- District: Pčinja
- Municipality: Bujanovac

Population (2002)
  - Total: 652
- Time zone: UTC+1 (CET)
  - Summer (DST): UTC+2 (CEST)

Zarbince (Serbian Cyrillic: Зарбинце, Albanian: Zarbicë) is a village in the municipality of Bujanovac, Serbia. According to the 2002 census, the town has a population of 652 people. Of these, 643 (98,61 %) were ethnic Albanians, 1 (0,15 %) Bosniaks, and 1 (0,15 %) other.
