= Ristovac =

Ristovac Ристовац (Serbian)
- Village (Selo)
- Location within Serbia
- Coordinates: 42°28′07″N 21°50′34″E
- Country: Serbia
- District: Pčinja
- Municipality: Vranje
- Time zone: UTC+1 (CET)
  - Summer (DST): UTC+2 (CEST)

Ristovac (Serbian Cyrillic: Ристовац) is a small town in the Municipality of Vranje located in the Pčinja District of south-east Serbia. Ristovac has 342 according to the 2002 census.
