= Ljanik =

Ljanik Љаник (Serbian)
- Village (Selo)
- Location within Serbia
- Coordinates: 42°18′47″N 21°49′05″E
- Country: Serbia
- District: Pčinja District
- Municipality: Preševo

Area
  - Total: 5.33 km^{2} (2.06 sq mi)

Population (2002)
  - Total: 29
  - Density: 5.4/km^{2} (14/sq mi)
- Time zone: UTC+1 (CET)
  - Summer (DST): UTC+2 (CEST)

Ljanik (Serbian Cyrillic: Љаник) is a village located in the municipality of Preševo, Serbia. According to the 2002 census, the village has a population of 29 people, all ethnic Serbs. The toponym is derived from ljanik, a variant of the word pčelinjak ("apiary"). The village was known for its beehives and hence got its name. There are two neighbourhoods (mahale), called Selo and Rosulja. It is located at the slopes of the Rujan mountain.

The village is one out of four with Serb majority in the Preševo municipality, along with Svinjište, Slavujevac and Cakanovac; the rest having an Albanian majority.
