= Ranatovce =

Ranatovce Ратановце (Serbian) Ranatoc (Albanian)
- Village (Selo)
- Location within Serbia
- Coordinates: 42°22′32″N 21°34′58″E
- Country: Serbia
- District: Pčinja District
- Municipality: Preševo

Area
  - Total: 2.93 km^{2} (1.13 sq mi)

Population (2002)
  - Total: 65
  - Density: 22/km^{2} (57/sq mi)
- Time zone: UTC+1 (CET)
  - Summer (DST): UTC+2 (CEST)

Ranatovce (Serbian Cyrillic: Ранатовце; Albanian: Ranatoc) is a village located in the municipality of Preševo, Serbia. According to the 2002 census, the village has a population of 65 people. Of these, 64 were ethnic Albanians, and 1 other.

== History ==
Ranatovce belongs to the ethnographic region of Karadak, specifically the subregion of Llapushnica. Until the summer of 1947, the villages of Llapushnica—Ranatovce, Stanevce, Kurbalija, Depce, Sefer, Bujić, Cerevajka, Pečeno and Maxherja—were part of the Municipality of Zhegër, located in the District of Gjilan and Kosovo. However, they were unexpectedly incorporated by Yugoslav authorities into the Municipality of Preševo, with which they had no cultural ties and only limited connections. The inhabitants are divided into four clans, two of which descend from the Sopi tribe, one which descend from the Krasniqi tribe, while the other descend Berisha tribe.
