= Mustafë Memeti =

Albanian imam in Switzerland

Mustafë Mehmeti
- Title: Imam

Personal life
- Born: August 20, 1962 (age 63)
- Citizenship: Swiss
- Education: Islamic University of Madinah

Religious life
- Religion: Islam
- Denomination: Sunni
- Jurisprudence: Hanafi

Mustafë Memeti (born in Žujince, Preševo, Kosovo, 20 August 1962) is an Albanian imam in Switzerland.

He is imam at the Bern Islamic Center and President of the Albanian Islamic Organization of Switzerland (Albanian: Bashkësisë Islame Shqiptare në Zvicër). He also volunteers pastoral care at the local Thorberg Castle Prison. Memeti participates in the interfaith project known as the House of Religions. In 2014, he was named “Swiss Citizen of the Year” by the SonntagsZeitung.

== Biography ==
He was born the fourth of eight children to Mullah Vaxhid Memeti. He attended primary school in Kosovo and left town at the age of thirteen to study in the Arab world. He studied in Syria, Tunisia, and ended up in Saudi Arabia. He studied sharia (law), fiqh (jurisprudence), and hadith interpretation at the Islamic University of Madinah in Medina, earning a 95% score on his thesis entitled Martesa e përkohshme „muta“ në Shiizm dhe tek Ehlu Suneti dhe Xhemati (“Temporary Marriage or Nikah mut’ah in Shia and Sunni Societies”).

Memeti is married, has three children, and lives with them in Bern.
