= Iljasa Zulfiu =

Serbian footballer

Personal information
- Full name: Iljasa Zulfiu
- Date of birth: 27 March 1998 (age 28)
- Place of birth: Miratovac, Serbia, FR Yugoslavia
- Height: 1.67 m (5 ft 6 in)
- Position: Second striker

Team information
- Current team: Dukagjini
- Number: 23

Youth career
- 2008–2015: Lugina
- 2015–2017: Radnik Surdulica

Senior career*
Years	Team	Apps	(Gls)
2017–2018	Radnik Surdulica	1	(0)
2017	→ Pukovac (loan)	6	(0)
2017–2018	→ Ozren Sokobanja (loan)	29	(6)
2018–2019	Flamurtari	1	(2)
2019–2021	Malisheva		
2021–2022	Laçi	30	(2)
2022–2024	Dukagjini	51	(7)
2024	Zhenis	12	(1)
2024–2025	Drita	32	(1)
2025–	Dukagjini	25	(4)
- * Club domestic league appearances and goals as of 22 June 2026

Iljasa Zulfiu (Serbian: Иљаса Зулфији, romanized: Iljasa Zulfiji, Albanian: Ilaz Zylfiu; born 27 March 1998) is a Serbian professional footballer who plays as a second striker for Kosovo Superleague club Dukagjini.

== Club career ==
=== Radnik Surdulica ===
Born in Miratovac, a small town in the municipality of Preševo as a member of Albanian ethnic group, Zulfiu started playing football at the age of 10. He was playing with football club Lugina, based in Aliđerce, until he joined Radnik Surdulica as a youngster. After almost two years with youth team, Zulfiu signed a one-year scholarship contract with Radnik in February 2017. He was also loaned on dual registration to the Serbian League East side Pukovac, making six appearances until the end of the 2016–17 campaign.

In summer 2017, Zulfiu joined the first team of Radnik Surdulica under coach Simo Krunić, but moved on new loan deal to Ozren Sokobanja shortly after. He scored his premier goal for the first season victory of Ozren over Timok on 16 September 2017. After the whole first-half season in the third-ranked league, a loan deal was terminated and Zulfiu returned to Radnik ending of November same year.

On 29 November 2017, Zulfiu made his official debut for Radnik Surdulica, replacing Miloš Stanković in 69 minute of the Serbian SuperLiga match against Red Star Belgrade. He has been reported as the first Albanian footballer in the club history since finding in 1926. In February 2018, Zulfiu signed his first four-your professional contract with Radnik, after which he extended his loan deal to Ozren until the end of 2017–18 campaign.

Returning from loan deal in summer 2018, Zulfiu started new season preparing under coach Mladen Dodić, but after being excluded from the 2018–19 Serbian SuperLiga player list, Zulfiu mutually terminated the contract and left Radnik as a free agent on the last day of July same year, along with teammate Krsta Đorđević.

== Playing style ==
Zulfiu is a 1.67 m high attacker, who usually plays as a second striker or attacking midfielder. He is characterized by speed and lucidity, affirmed as a goalscorer in the Serbian League East. He has also promoted himself as a free kick taker, scoring in a match against Jedinstvo Paraćin. He is often compared with Fadil Vokrri, a former Kosovo Albanian football forward.

== Honours ==
Drita

- Kosovo Superleague: 2024–25

Individual

- Kosovo Superleague Star of the Week: 2025–26 (Week 6)

== Career statistics ==
As of 3 August 2023

Club	Season	League			Cup		Other		Total	
Club	Season	Division	Apps	Goals	Apps	Goals	Apps	Goals	Apps	Goals
Radnik Surdulica	2016–17	Serbian SuperLiga	0	0	0	0	—		0	0
Radnik Surdulica	2017–18	Serbian SuperLiga	1	0	0	0	—		1	0
Radnik Surdulica	Total		1	0	0	0	—		1	0
Pukovac (loan)	2016–17	Serbian League East	6	0	0	0	—		6	0
Ozren Sokobanja (loan)	2017–18	Serbian League East	29	6	0	0	—		29	6
Flamurtari	2018–19	Kosovo Superleague	1	0	0	0	—		1	0
Malisheva	2019–20	Kosovo First League	Not available							
Malisheva	2020–21	Kosovo First League	Not available							
Malisheva	Total		36	6	0	0	—		36	6
Laçi	2020–21	Kategoria Superiore	9	0	0	0	—		9	0
Laçi	2021–22	Kategoria Superiore	21	2	5	0	5	0	31	2
Laçi	2022–23	Kategoria Superiore	0	0	0	0	0	0	0	0
Laçi	Total		30	2	5	0	5	0	40	2
Dukagjini	2022–23	Kosovo Superleague	34	4	1	0	—		35	4
Dukagjini	2023–24	Kosovo Superleague	0	0	0	0	4	4	4	4
Dukagjini	Total		34	4	1	0	4	4	39	8
Career total			101	12	6	0	9	4	116	16
