= Depce =

Depce Депце (Serbian) Depcë (Albanian)
- Village (Selo)
- Location within Serbia
- Coordinates: 42°21′35″N 21°33′15″E
- Country: Serbia
- District: Pčinja District
- Municipality: Preševo

Area
  - Total: 9.18 km^{2} (3.54 sq mi)
- Elevation: 799 m (2,621 ft)

Population (2002)
  - Total: 441
  - Density: 48.0/km^{2} (124/sq mi)
- Time zone: UTC+1 (CET)
  - Summer (DST): UTC+2 (CEST)

Depce (Serbian Cyrillic: Депце; Albanian: Depcë) is a village located in the municipality of Preševo, Serbia. According to the 2002 census, the village has a population of 441 people. Of these, 423 (95,91 %) were ethnic Albanians, and 17 (3,85 %) others. Agim Ramadani and his family originally hail from Depce.

== History ==
Depca belongs to the ethnographic region of Karadak, specifically the subregion of Llapushnica. Until the summer of 1947, the villages of Llapushnica—Depce, Kurbalija, Stanevce, Sefer, Bujić, Cerevajka, Pečeno, Maxherja, and Ranatovce—were part of the Municipality of Zhegër, located in the District of Gjilan and Kosovo. However, they were unexpectedly incorporated by Yugoslav authorities into the Municipality of Preševo, with which they had no cultural ties and only limited connections. All inhabitants descend from the Berisha tribe and are divided into three clans: Ukmemet, Gjinaj, and Zekbasha.

== Notable people ==
- Agim Ramadani, Albanian commander of the KLA (By origin)
