= Military of Serbia Civil Services =

The Military of Serbia Civil Services (Serbian Land Forces) provide aid in case of natural disasters deemed serious by the National Assembly of Serbia. Civil aid is outlined in the second pillar of the Serbian Armed Forces' mission statement.

== Donations ==
During the Russia–Ukraine gas disputes, Serbia and its neighbors were left without natural gas. Hours after possible sanctions had been announced, the 19th logistics battalion with the Army First Brigade donated and distributed heaters that used an alternate fuel source. Some of these heaters went to the Novi Sad military medical center.

== United Nations Children's Fund ==
Chief of the Department for Training and Doctrine Major General Petar Cornakov presented to the UNICEF program “School without Violence” a donation of approximately 290,000 RSD ($6,000 USD), collected by the members of Serbian Armed Forces and the Ministry of Defense. The Serbian Armed Forces support similar campaigns to help children receive additional education and protection.

== Military Medical Academy ==
The Military Medical Academy is a military hospital in Belgrade, which the Serbian Armed Forces opened to all citizens of Serbia. Citizens are free to use the hospital on certain days of the week, while during other times, the hospital is reserved for military use.

== Blood drive ==
The Serbian Armed Forces organized a blood donation campaign on 28 May 2008.

== Medical assistance ==
The medical units of the Serbian Armed Forces provide free medical assistance and water supply to remote Albanian-dominated villages of Presevo and Bujanovac in South Serbia. Military doctors have visited the villages of Mali Trnovac and Trstena. The mayor of Mali Trnovac, Sabri Jukupi, as well as the inhabitants reacted relatively positively. The mayor extended “his gratitude to soldiers of the Serbian Armed Forces” and stated that the medicine received was important to his family.

== Surgical emergencies ==
Lieutenant Colonel Goran Stankovic of the Serbian Armed Forces shared an example of a 15-year-old boy, Jeton Malici from Presevo, who was helping his father in the woods chopping trees and injured his leg with a chainsaw. His father, Skender, brought him to the local military base in Cvore. Captain First Class Jovica Bosanac provided first aid to the boy and ordered a military medical vehicle to transport him to Presevo. After the boy recovered, Jeton's father brought sweets and refreshments for the soldiers and commanders. The members of the 78th Motorized Brigade had to dig out a 1.1 km long water canal due to the inaccessibility of the terrain.

== Road construction ==
The 78th Motorized Brigade is credited with the construction of many roads, including for the village of Muhovac in South Serbia, which was previously inaccessible. Another project in the Trniste municipality involved the unit clearing kilometers of roads that were mostly inaccessible. The Serbian Armed Force members repaired an 8-kilometre-long (5.0 mi) road from Bujici to Ranitovac village. In addition, the military built a road to a local mosque in South Serbia in the village of Ilince.

== Unexploded missile cleanup ==
161 depleted uranium missiles were recovered in southern Serbia, yet no recovery was made in Kosovo due to the legal restrictions on the Serbian army. The missiles were left in Reljan, near Presevo after the 1999 NATO bombing campaign. During the 78-day air strikes on Serbia's predecessor Yugoslavia in 1999, NATO dropped 31,000 missiles and bombs containing depleted uranium. In Kosovo, NATO identified 112 sites it attacked with depleted uranium munitions. NATO did not give the government of Serbia a comprehensive list of the bombing sites. The army's cleanup operation in Reljan cleared 12 hectares of contaminated grounds. 2.4 cubic meters of contaminated soil was collected and removed. The Serbian government funded the cleanup operation in the Reljan site with €350,000 (US$450,000).
