= Bujić =

Bujić Бујић (Serbian) Buhiç (Albanian)
- Village (Selo)
- Location within Serbia
- Coordinates: 42°20′08″N 21°36′08″E
- Country: Serbia
- District: Pčinja District
- Municipality: Preševo

Area
  - Total: 2.52 km^{2} (0.97 sq mi)

Population (2002)
  - Total: 89
  - Density: 35/km^{2} (91/sq mi)
- Time zone: UTC+1 (CET)
  - Summer (DST): UTC+2 (CEST)

Bujić (Serbian Cyrillic: Бујић; Albanian: Buhiç) is a village located in the municipality of Preševo, Serbia. According to the 2002 census, the village has a population of 89 people of which 88 are Albanian and 1 other.

== History ==
Bujić belongs to the ethnographic region of Karadak, specifically the subregion of Llapushnica. Until the summer of 1947, the villages of Llapushnica—Bujić, Stanevce, Kurbalija, Depce, Sefer, Cerevajka, Pečeno, Maxherja, and Ranatovce—were part of the Municipality of Zhegër, located in the District of Gjilan and Kosovo. However, they were unexpectedly incorporated by Yugoslav authorities into the Municipality of Preševo, with which they had no cultural ties and only limited connections. The inhabitants are divided into three clans, as well as one Muhaxhir clan, all of which descend from the Berisha tribe.
