= Oraovica (Preševo) =

Oraovica: Ораовица (Serbian); Rahovicë (Albanian)
- Village (Selo)
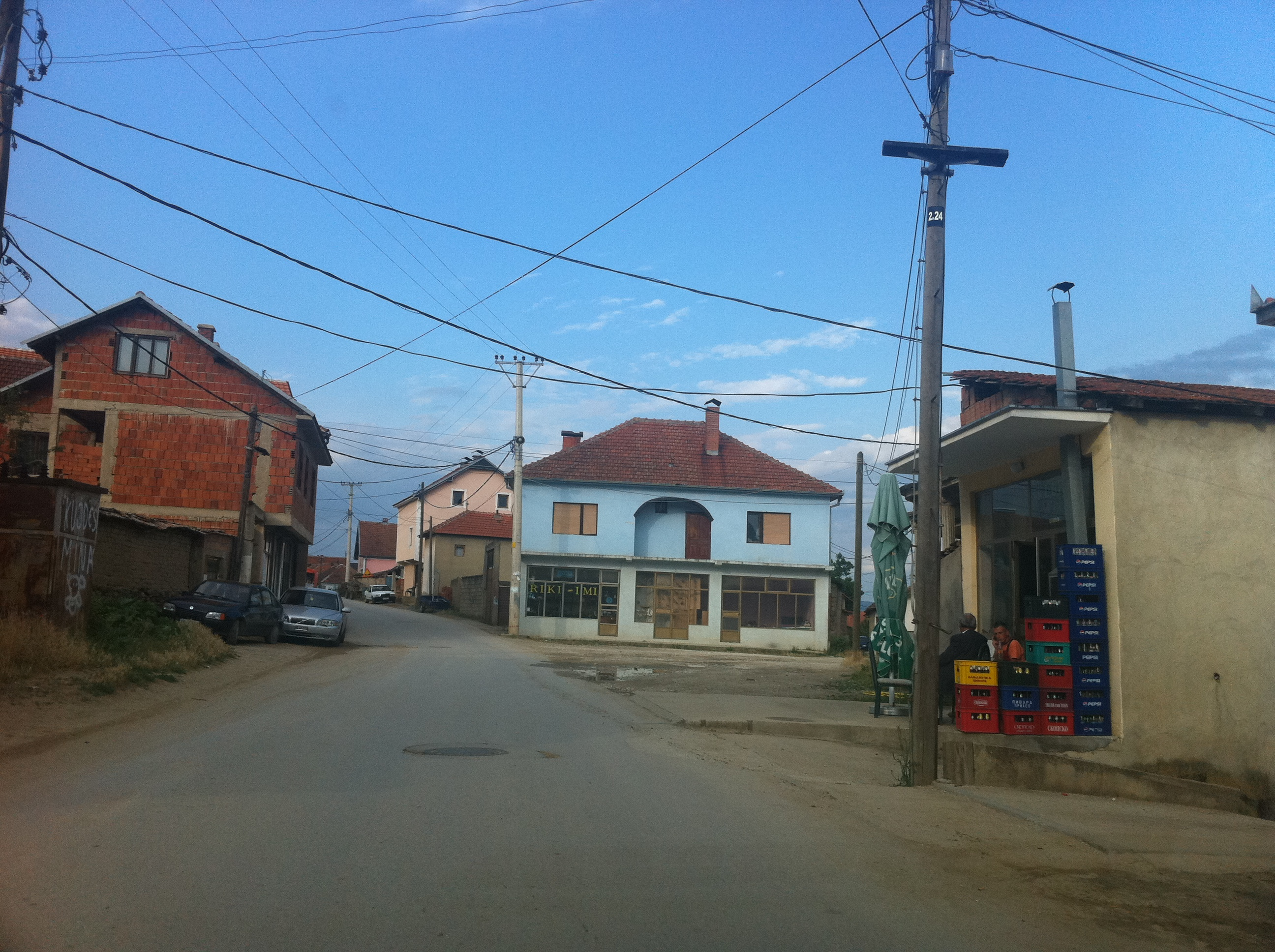

- Location within Serbia
- Coordinates: 42°19′18″N 21°39′21″E
- Country: Serbia
- District: Pčinja District
- Municipality: Preševo

Area
  - Total: 17.35 km^{2} (6.70 sq mi)

Population (2002)
  - Total: 3,774
  - Density: 217.5/km^{2} (563.4/sq mi)
- Time zone: UTC+1 (CET)
  - Summer (DST): UTC+2 (CEST)

Oraovica (Serbian Cyrillic: Ораовица; Albanian: Rahovicë) is a village located in the municipality of Preševo, Serbia. According to the 2002 census, the village had a population of 3774 people. Of these, 3737 (99,01 %) were ethnic Albanians, 2 (0,05 %) Muslims, 1 (0,02 %) Serb and 26 (0,68 %) others.

== See also ==
- Battle of Oraovica
