= Buštranje, Preševo =

Buštranje Буштрање (Serbian) Bushtran (Albanian)
- Village (Selo)
- Location within Serbia
- Coordinates: 42°19′50″N 21°45′18″E
- Country: Serbia
- District: Pčinja District
- Municipality: Preševo

Area
  - Total: 9.51 km^{2} (3.67 sq mi)

Population (2002)
  - Total: 872
  - Density: 91.7/km^{2} (237/sq mi)
- Time zone: UTC+1 (CET)
  - Summer (DST): UTC+2 (CEST)

Buštranje (Albanian: Bushtran) is a village located in the municipality of Preševo, Serbia. According to the 2002 census, the village had a population of 872, of whom 682 (78,21 %) were ethnic Albanians, 186 (21,33 %) were Serbs and 2 (0,22 %) others.
