= Trnava, Preševo =

Trnava Трнава (Serbian) Tërnavë (Albanian)
- Village (Selo)
- Location within Serbia
- Coordinates: 42°16′51″N 21°38′47″E
- Country: Serbia
- District: Pčinja District
- Municipality: Preševo

Area
  - Total: 19.60 km^{2} (7.57 sq mi)

Population (2011)
  - Total: 1,160
  - Density: 59.2/km^{2} (153/sq mi)
- Time zone: UTC+1 (CET)
  - Summer (DST): UTC+2 (CEST)

Trnava (Serbian Cyrillic: Трнава; Albanian: Tërnavë) is a village located in the municipality of Preševo, Serbia. According to the 2002 census, the village had a population of 1,160 people. Of these, 1,018 (87.75 %) were ethnic Albanians, 109 (9.39 %) were Serbs, 2 (0.17 %) Bosniaks, 1 (0.08 %) Hungarian, 1 (0.08 %) Macedonian, and 28 (2.41 %) others.
