= Bukarevac =

Bukarevac Букаревац (Serbian) Bukuroc (Albanian)
- Village (Selo)
- Location within Serbia
- Coordinates: 42°20′05″N 21°42′34″E
- Country: Serbia
- District: Pčinja District
- Municipality: Preševo

Area
  - Total: 4.63 km^{2} (1.79 sq mi)

Population (2002)
  - Total: 905
  - Density: 195/km^{2} (506/sq mi)
- Time zone: UTC+1 (CET)
  - Summer (DST): UTC+2 (CEST)

Bukarevac (Serbian Cyrillic: Букаревац; Albanian: Bukuroc) is a village located in the municipality of Preševo, Serbia. According to the 2002 census, the village has a population of 905 people. Of these, 899 (99,33%) were ethnic Albanians, and 6 (0,66 %) others. The name of the settlement Bukarevac originates from the anthroponym Bukor, from the family name Bukorovci.
