= Gare, Preševo =

Gare Гаре (Serbian) Garja (Albanian)
- Village (Selo)
- Location within Serbia
- Coordinates: 42°22′15″N 21°37′22″E
- Country: Serbia
- District: Pčinja District
- Municipality: Preševo

Area
  - Total: 5.30 km^{2} (2.05 sq mi)

Population (2002)
  - Total: 110
  - Density: 21/km^{2} (54/sq mi)
- Time zone: UTC+1 (CET)
  - Summer (DST): UTC+2 (CEST)

Gare (Serbian Cyrillic: Гаре) is a village located in the municipality of Preševo, Serbia. According to the 2002 census, the village had a population of 110 people, all Albanians. According to the 2002 census, the village was without inhabitants.
