= Strezovce =

Strezovce may refer to:

- Strezovce, Staro Nagoričane, North Macedonia
- Strezovce (Preševo), Serbia
- Strezovce mine, Kosovo
