= Berčevac =

Berčevac Берчавац (Serbian) Berçec (Albanian)
- Village (Selo)
- Location within Serbia
- Coordinates: 42°23′18″N 21°38′56″E
- Country: Serbia
- District: Pčinja District
- Municipality: Preševo

Area
  - Total: 4.11 km^{2} (1.59 sq mi)

Population (2002)
  - Total: 19
  - Density: 4.6/km^{2} (12/sq mi)
- Time zone: UTC+1 (CET)
  - Summer (DST): UTC+2 (CEST)

Berčevac (Serbian Cyrillic: Берчевац; Albanian: Berçec) is a village located in the municipality of Preševo, Serbia. According to the 2002 census, the village has a population of 19 people. Of these, 18 were ethnic Albanians, and 1 other.
