= Golemi Dol =

Golemi Dol Големи Дол (Serbian) Golemidoll (Albanian)
- Village (Selo)
- Location within Serbia
- Coordinates: 42°18′01″N 21°44′12″E
- Country: Serbia
- District: Pčinja District
- Municipality: Preševo

Area
  - Total: 5.28 km^{2} (2.04 sq mi)

Population (2002)
  - Total: 294
  - Density: 55.7/km^{2} (144/sq mi)
- Time zone: UTC+1 (CET)
  - Summer (DST): UTC+2 (CEST)

Golemi Dol (Serbian Cyrillic: Големи Дол; Albanian: Golemidoll) is a village located in the municipality of Preševo, Serbia. According to the 2002 census, the village has a population of 294 people. Of these, 266 (90,47 %) were ethnic Albanians, and 28 (9,52 %) were Serbs.
