= Donja Šušaja =

Donja Šušaja Доња Шушаја (Serbian) Shoshajë e Poshtme (Albanian)
- Village (Selo)
- Location within Serbia
- Coordinates: 42°20′56″N 21°41′21″E
- Country: Serbia
- District: Pčinja District
- Municipality: Preševo

Area
  - Total: 1.01 km^{2} (0.39 sq mi)

Population (2002)
  - Total: 342
  - Density: 339/km^{2} (877/sq mi)
- Time zone: UTC+1 (CET)
  - Summer (DST): UTC+2 (CEST)

Donja Šušaja (Serbian Cyrillic: Доња Шушаја; Albanian: Shoshajë e Poshtme) is a village located in the municipality of Preševo, Serbia. According to the 2002 census, the village has a population of 342 people. Of these, 341 (99,70 %) were ethnic Albanians, and 1 (0,29 %) other.
