= Miratovac =

Miratovac Миратовац (Serbian) Miratoc (Albanian)
- Village (Selo)
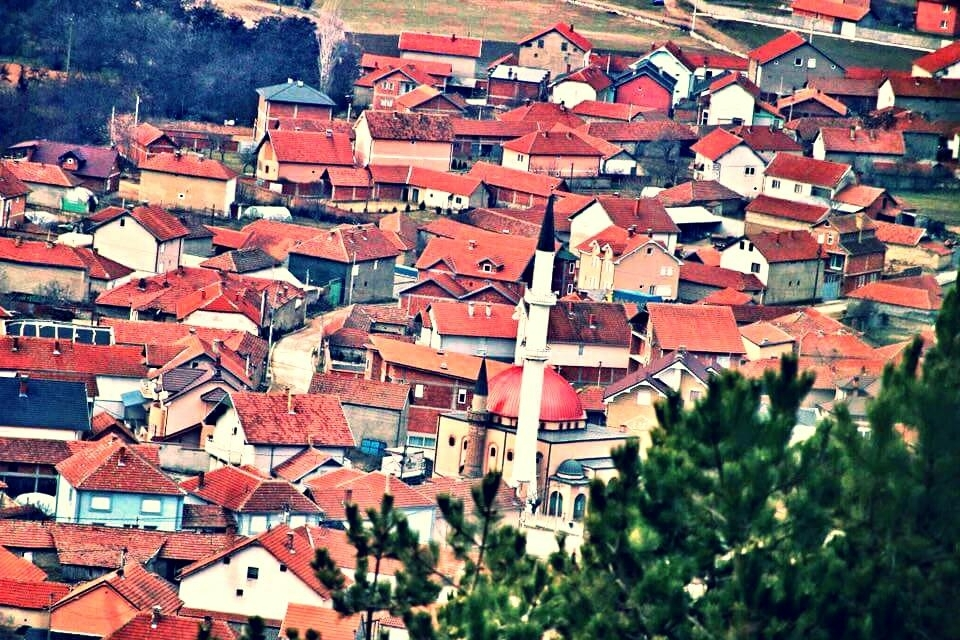

- Location within Serbia
- Coordinates: 42°15′34″N 21°39′49″E
- Country: Serbia
- District: Pčinja District
- Municipality: Preševo

Area
  - Total: 25.05 km^{2} (9.67 sq mi)

Population (2011)
  - Total: 2,774
  - Density: 110.7/km^{2} (286.8/sq mi)
- Time zone: UTC+1 (CET)
  - Summer (DST): UTC+2 (CEST)

Miratovac (Serbian: Миратовац; Albanian: Miratoc) is a village located in the municipality of Preševo, Serbia.

== Demographics ==
According to the 2002 census, the town has a population of 2774 people. Of these, 2731 (98,44 %) were ethnic Albanians, 13 (0,46 %) were Serbs, 1 (0,03 %) Muslim, 1 (0,03 %) Bosniak, and 26 (0,93 %) others.

== Notable people ==
- Fidan Aliti, Albanian football player
