= Žujince =

Žujince Жујинце (Serbian) Zhunicë (Albanian)
- Village (Selo)
- Location within Serbia
- Coordinates: 42°18′55″N 21°42′07″E
- Country: Serbia
- District: Pčinja District
- Municipality: Preševo

Area
  - Total: 8.31 km^{2} (3.21 sq mi)

Population (2002)
  - Total: 1,248
  - Density: 150/km^{2} (389/sq mi)
- Time zone: UTC+1 (CET)
  - Summer (DST): UTC+2 (CEST)

Žujince (Serbian Cyrillic: Жујинце; Albanian: Zhunicë) is a village located in the municipality of Preševo, Serbia. According to the 2002 census, the village had a population of 1,248 people. Of these, 1,189 (95.27%) were ethnic Albanians, 52 (4.16%) were Serbs, and 3 (0.24%) described themselves as belonging to other ethnicities.
