= Strezovce (Preševo) =

Strezovce Стрезовце (Serbian) Strezoc (Albanian)
- Village (Selo)
- Location within Serbia
- Coordinates: 42°16′33″N 21°43′48″E
- Country: Serbia
- District: Pčinja District
- Municipality: Preševo

Area
  - Total: 9.52 km^{2} (3.68 sq mi)

Population (2002)
  - Total: 995
  - Density: 105/km^{2} (271/sq mi)
- Time zone: UTC+1 (CET)
  - Summer (DST): UTC+2 (CEST)

Strezovce (Serbian Cyrillic: Стрезовце; Albanian: Strezoc) is a village located in the municipality of Preševo, Serbia. According to the 2002 census, the village had a population of 995 people. Of these, 708 (71.15 %) were ethnic Albanians, 272 (27.33 %) were Serbs, 2 (0.20 %) Muslims, 2 (0.20 %) Macedonians, and 9 (0.90 %) others.
