= Slavujevac =

Slavujevac Славујевац (Serbian)
- Village (Selo)
- Location within Serbia
- Coordinates: 42°16′19″N 21°45′53″E
- Country: Serbia
- District: Pčinja District
- Municipality: Preševo

Area
  - Total: 10.01 km^{2} (3.86 sq mi)

Population (2002)
  - Total: 482
  - Density: 48.2/km^{2} (125/sq mi)
- Time zone: UTC+1 (CET)
  - Summer (DST): UTC+2 (CEST)

Slavujevac (Serbian Cyrillic: Славујевац) is a village located in the municipality of Preševo, Serbia. According to the 2002 census, the village has a population of 482 people.
