= Svinjište =

Svinjište Свињиште (Serbian)
- Village (Selo)
- Location within Serbia
- Coordinates: 42°19′43″N 21°48′02″E
- Country: Serbia
- District: Pčinja District
- Municipality: Preševo

Area
  - Total: 6.32 km^{2} (2.44 sq mi)

Population (2002)
  - Total: 103
  - Density: 16.3/km^{2} (42.2/sq mi)
- Time zone: UTC+1 (CET)
  - Summer (DST): UTC+2 (CEST)

Svinjište (Serbian Cyrillic: Свињиште) is a village located in the municipality of Preševo, Serbia. According to the 2002 census, the village has a population of 103 people.
