= Reljan =

Reljan Рељан (Serbian) Leran (Albanian)
- Village (Selo)
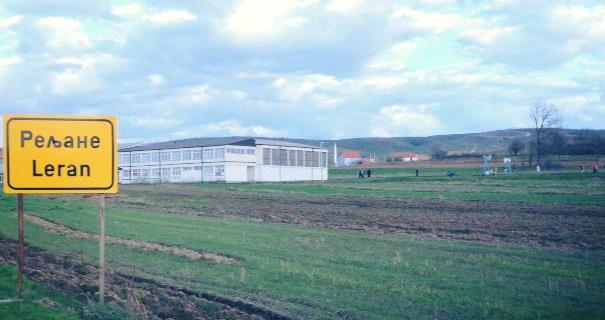
- Entry into the village

- Location within Serbia
- Coordinates: 42°18′35″N 21°44′08″E
- Country: Serbia
- District: Pčinja District
- Municipality: Preševo

Area
  - Total: 8.98 km^{2} (3.47 sq mi)

Population (2002)
  - Total: 694
  - Density: 77.3/km^{2} (200/sq mi)
- Time zone: UTC+1 (CET)
  - Summer (DST): UTC+2 (CEST)

Reljan (Serbian Cyrillic: Рељан; Albanian: Leran) is a village located in the municipality of Preševo, Serbia. According to the 2002 census, the village had a population of 694 people. Of these, 489 (70.46 %) were ethnic Albanians, 203 (29.25 %) were Serbs, 1 (0.14 %) Russian, and 1 (0.14 %) other.
