= Aliđerce =

Aliđerce Алиђерце (Serbian) Geraj (Albanian)
- Village (Selo)
- Location within Serbia
- Coordinates: 42°17′27″N 21°44′00″E
- Country: Serbia
- District: Pčinja District
- Municipality: Preševo

Area
  - Total: 5.08 km^{2} (1.96 sq mi)

Population (2002)
  - Total: 1,033
  - Density: 203/km^{2} (527/sq mi)
- Time zone: UTC+1 (CET)
  - Summer (DST): UTC+2 (CEST)

Aliđerce (Serbian Cyrillic: Алиђерце; Albanian: Geraj) is a village located in the municipality of Preševo, Serbia. According to the 2002 census, the village had a population of 1,033 people. Of these, 1,022 (98.93%) were ethnic Albanians, 1 Muslim (0.09 %), 1 Bosniak (0.09 %) and 9 others (0.87%).
