= Cakanovac =

Cakanovac Цакановац (Serbian) Cakanoc (Albanian)
- Village (Selo)
- Location within Serbia
- Coordinates: 42°16′30″N 21°40′51″E
- Country: Serbia
- District: Pčinja District
- Municipality: Preševo

Area
  - Total: 3.05 km^{2} (1.18 sq mi)

Population (2002)
  - Total: 221
  - Density: 72.5/km^{2} (188/sq mi)
- Time zone: UTC+1 (CET)
  - Summer (DST): UTC+2 (CEST)

Cakanovac (Serbian Cyrillic: Цакановац; Albanian: Cakanoc) is a village located in the municipality of Preševo, Serbia. According to the 2002 census, the village has a population of 221 people. Of these, 186 (84,16 %) were Serbs, 32 (14,47 %) were ethnic Albanians, and 3 (1,35 %) Macedonians.
