= Preševo =

Preševo Прешево (Serbian) Preshevë (Albanian)
- Town and municipality
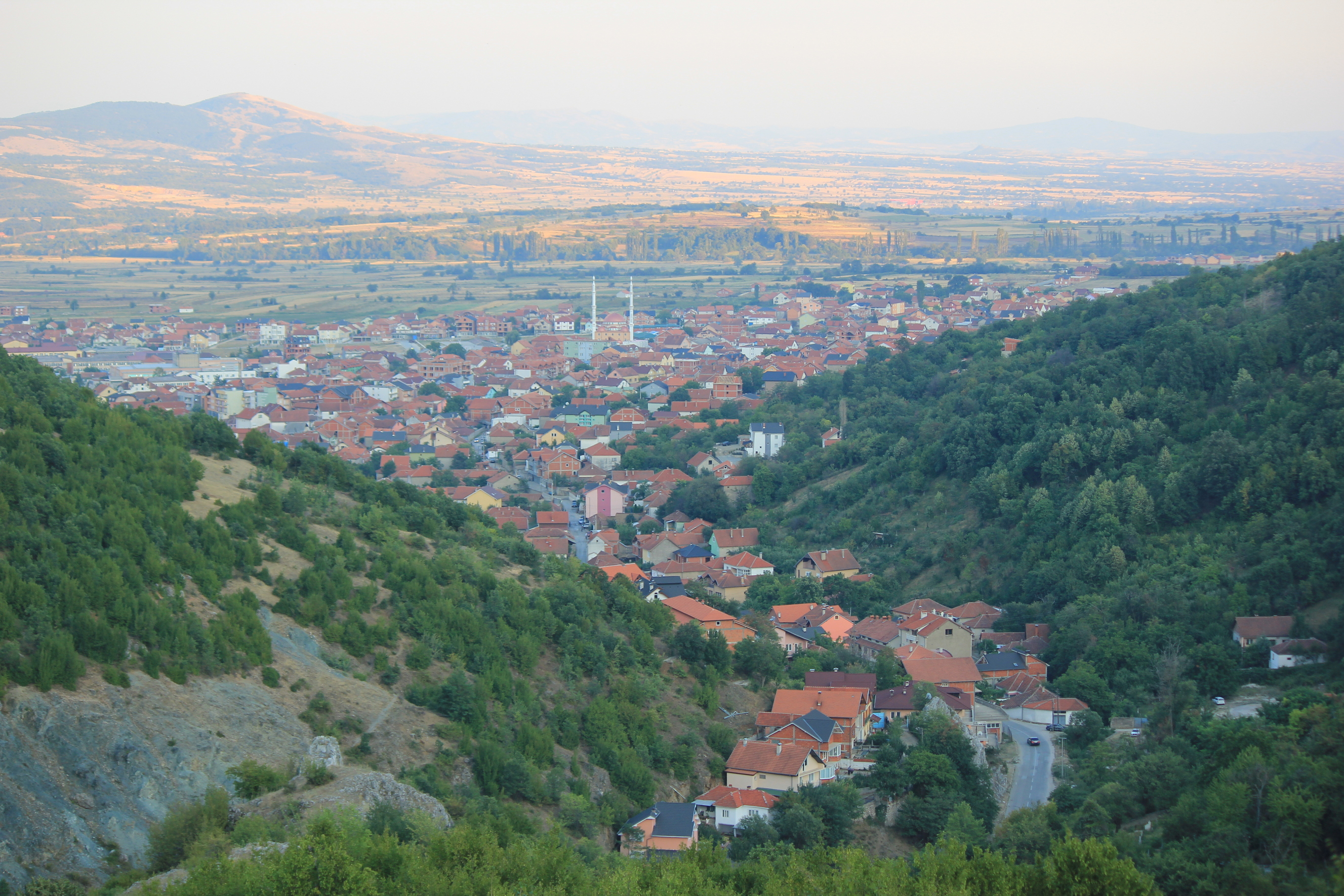
- Panorama of Preševo

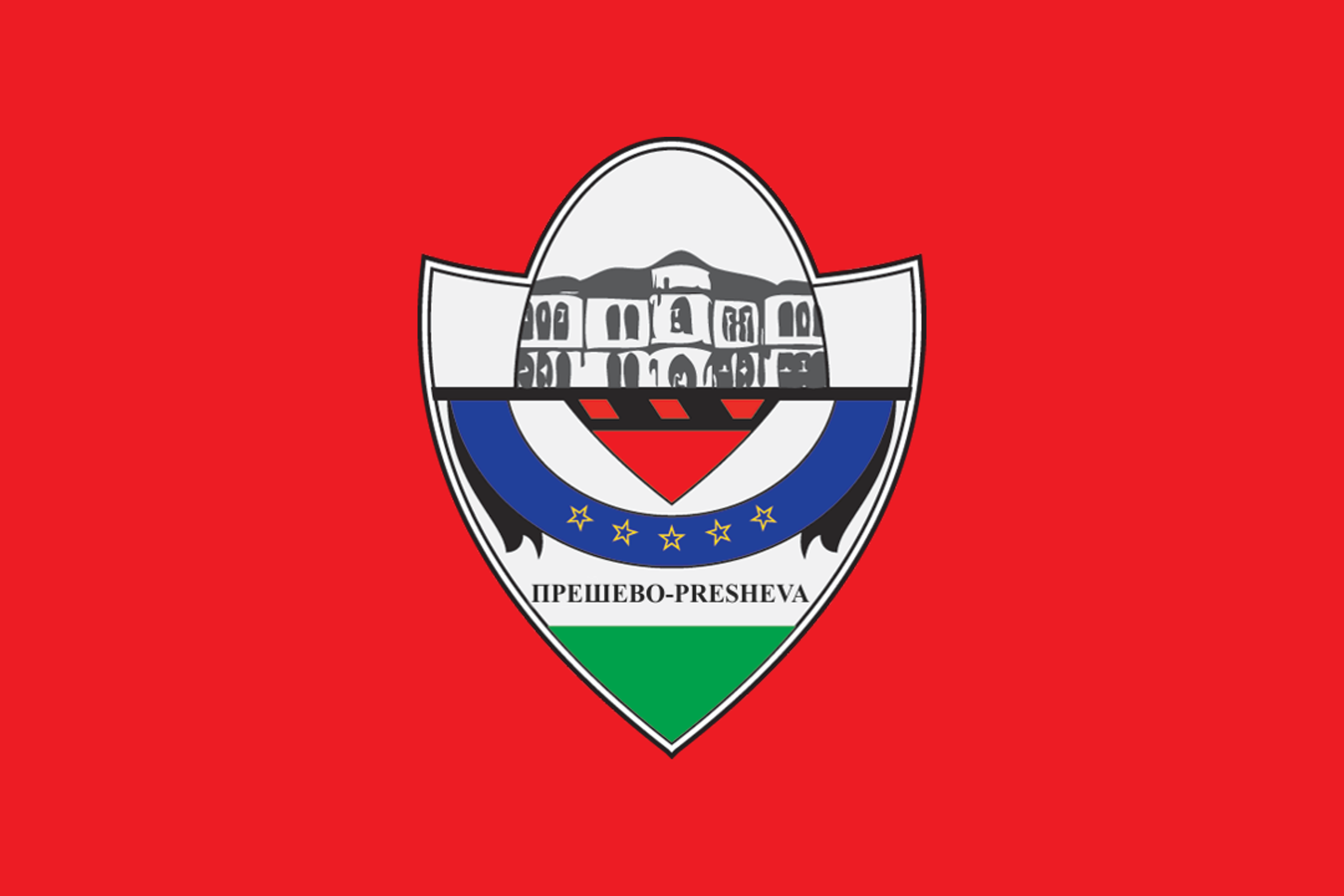
- Flag Coat of arms

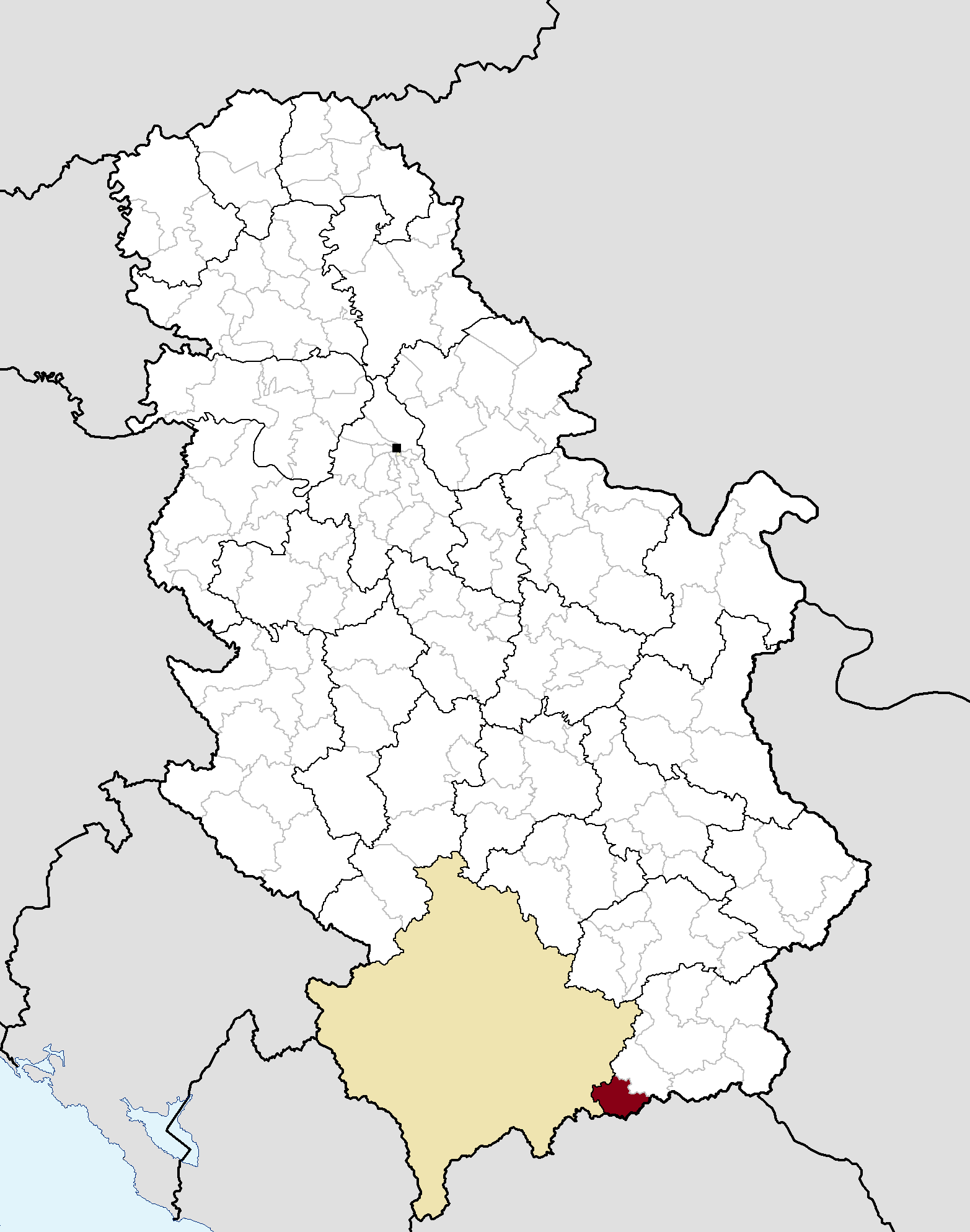
- Location of the municipality of Preševo within Serbia
- Coordinates: 42°18′32″N 21°38′52″E
- Country: Serbia
- Region: Southern and Eastern Serbia
- District: Pčinja
- Settlements: 35

Government
  - Mayor: Ardita Sinani (PVD)

Area
  - Town: 22.42 km^{2} (8.66 sq mi)
  - Municipality: 264 km^{2} (102 sq mi)
- Elevation: 463 m (1,519 ft)

Population (2022 census)
  - Municipality: 33,449
  - Municipality density: 127/km^{2} (328/sq mi)
- Time zone: UTC+1 (CET)
  - Summer (DST): UTC+2 (CEST)
- Postal code: 17523
- Area code: +381(0)17
- Car plates: VR
- Official languages: Official: Serbian; In official use: Serbian; Albanian
- Website: www.presevo.rs

Preševo (Serbian Cyrillic: Прешево, Serbian pronunciation: [prêʃeʋə]; Albanian: Presheva, Albanian pronunciation: [preʃevə]) is a town and municipality located in the Pčinja District of southern Serbia. As of the 2022 census, the municipality has a population of 33,449 inhabitants. It is the southernmost town in Central Serbia and largest in the geographical region of Preševo Valley.

Preševo is also a modern cultural center of Albanians in Serbia. Albanians form the ethnic majority of the municipality, followed by Serbs, Roma and other ethnic groups.

== History ==
Municipality of Preševo in Pčinja District

Slavs arrived roughly in the 7th century, when they first migrated to the Balkans, and by the Middle Ages, Preševo was part of the Kingdom of Serbia. According to Serbian Emperor Stefan Dušan's charter to the monastery of Arhiljevica dated August 1355, sevastokrator Dejan possessed a large province east of Skopska Crna Gora. It included the old župe (counties) of Žegligovo and Preševo (modern Kumanovo region with Sredorek, Kozjačija and the larger part of Pčinja). As despot under the rule of Serbian monarch Stefan Uroš V, Dejan was entrusted with the administration of the territory between South Morava, Pčinja, Skopska Crna Gora (hereditary lands) and in the east, the Upper Struma river with Velbuzhd, a province notably larger than during Dušan's life. After the death of Dejan, his province, besides the župe of Žegligovo and Upper Struma, was appropriated to nobleman Vlatko Paskačić. Dejan's eldest son Jovan also received the title of despot, like his father before, by Emperor Uroš. In the new redistribution of feudal power, after 1371, the brothers despot Jovan and gospodin Konstantin greatly expanded their province. Not only did they recreate their father's province but also at least doubled the territory, on all sides, but chiefly towards the south. Ottoman sources report that in 1373, the Ottoman army compelled Jovan (who they called Saruyar) in the upper Struma, to recognize Ottoman vassalage. As King of Serbia Prince Marko had done, also the Dejanović brothers recognized Ottoman sovereignty. Although vassals, they had their own government. In the Wallachian victory at the Battle of Rovine (17 May 1395), both Marko and Konstantin died. The provinces of Marko and Konstantin became Ottoman.

From 1877 to 1913, Preševo was part of Kosovo Vilayet of the Ottoman Empire. According to the statistics of the Bulgarian ethnographer Vasil Kanchov, from 1900, the settlement is recorded as Prešovo as having 2000 inhabitants, all Albanian Muslims. Following the First Balkan War in 1912, the Kingdom of Serbia returned the area.

=== Yugoslavia (1918–92) ===
The Kingdom of Yugoslavia was formed after World War I. From 1929 to 1941, Preševo was part of the Vardar Banovina.

During the April War the Kingdom of Yugoslavia capitulated after 12 days of war against the Axis powers. On April 20, Bulgaria occupied part of the Kingdom of Yugoslavia, including Preševo. The royal authoritarian dictatorship of Bulgaria occupied the area until September 7, 1944, when they handed the area over to Nazi Germany. The Albanian collaborationist regime, along with Balli Kombëtar, subsequently took over the area. In mid-November, the Partisans forced the Balli Kombëtar to retreat.

From 1945 until 1992, Preševo was part of Socialist Republic of Serbia, within SFR Yugoslavia.

=== Breakup of Yugoslavia (1991–99) ===
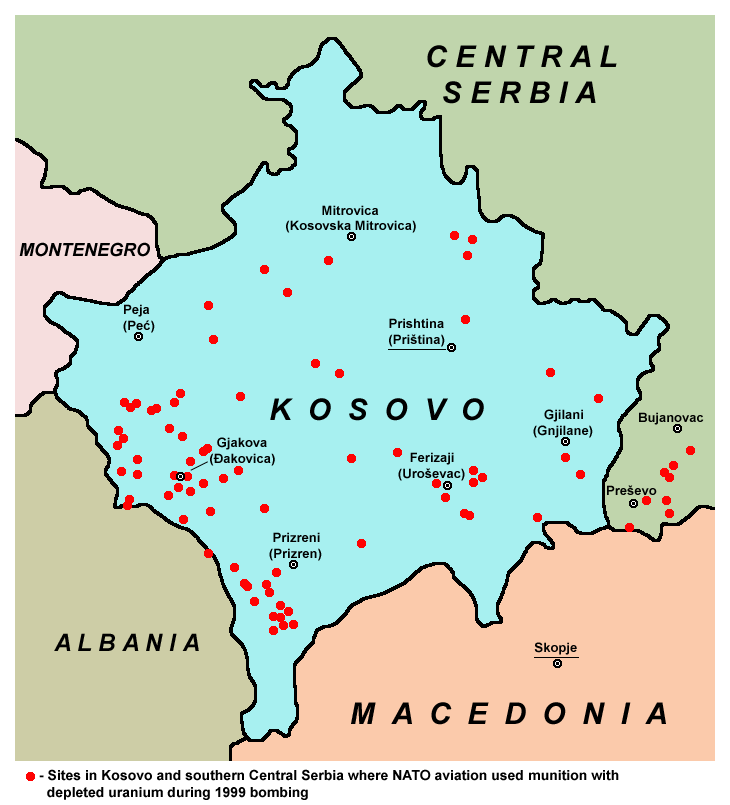
Sites near Preševo where NATO aviation used munition with depleted uranium during 1999 bombing

In 1992, the Albanians separatists in the area organized a referendum in which they voted that Preševo, Medveđa and Bujanovac should join the self-declared assembly of the proto-state Republic of Kosova. However, no major events happened until the end of the 1990s.

During the NATO bombing of Yugoslavia in 1999, a total of 161 depleted uranium bullets have been recovered in Reljan near Preševo in southern Serbia. The Serbian government has funded the cleanup operation of the Reljan site with 350,000 euros.

Following the breakup of Yugoslavia, and nearby Kosovo War which lasted until 1999, between 1999 and 2001, an ethnic Albanian paramilitary separatist organization, the UÇPMB, raised an armed insurgency in the Preševo Valley, in the region mostly inhabited by Albanians, with a goal to occupy these three municipalities from Serbia and attempt to join them to the self-proclaimed proto-state Republic of Kosova.

Following the overthrow of Slobodan Milošević, the new Serbian government suppressed the violence by 2001 and defeated the separatists. NATO troops also helped the Serbian government by ensuring that the rebels do not import the conflicts back into Kosovo.

In 2009, Serbia opened a military base Cepotina 5 kilometers south of Bujanovac, to further stabilize the area.

=== Modern ===
Today, Preševo is located in the Pčinja District of southern Serbia.

On 7 March 2017, the President of Albania Bujar Nishani made a visit to the municipalities of Bujanovac and Preševo, in which Albanians form the ethnic majority.

== Settlements ==
Aside from the town of Preševo, the municipality includes the following settlements:

- Aliđerce
- Berčevac
- Bujić
- Bukarevac
- Bukovac
- Buštranje
- Cakanovac
- Cerevajka
- Crnotince
- Čukarka
- Depce
- Donja Šušaja
- Gare
- Golemi Dol
- Gornja Šušaja
- Gospođince
- Ilince
- Kurbalija
- Ljanik
- Mađare
- Miratovac
- Norča
- Oraovica
- Pečeno
- Rajince
- Ranatovce
- Reljan
- Sefer
- Slavujevac
- Stanevce
- Strezovce
- Svinjište
- Trnava
- Žujince

== Demographics ==
Historical population
Year	Pop.	±% p.a.
1948	23,379	—
1953	24,607	+1.03%
1961	26,738	+1.04%
1971	30,056	+1.18%
1981	33,948	+1.23%
1991	38,943	+1.38%
2002	34,904	−0.99%
2011^{[a]}	23,080	−4.49%
2022	33,449	+3.43%

According to the 2002 census results, the municipality of Preševo has 34,904 inhabitants. The 2011 census was largely boycotted by the majority (Albanians) of the municipality. As a result, only 3,080 were inhabitants were registered. As of the 2022 census, the municipality has a population of 33,449 inhabitants.

=== Ethnic groups ===
According to the census conducted in 2002, Albanians form nearly 90% of the municipality, and over 95% of the town. Most of the remainder of its inhabitants are Serbs, who are mainly concentrated in the settlements of Ljanik, Svinjište, Slavujevac and Cakanovac. The rest of the settlements have an absolute Albanian majority.

The ethnic composition of the municipality:

Ethnic group	Population 1961	Population 1971	Population 1981	Population 1991	Population 2002	Population 2011^{[a]}	2022 Census	
Ethnic group	Population 1961	Population 1971	Population 1981	Population 1991	Population 2002	Population 2011^{[a]}	Population	%
Albanians	18,229	23,625	28,961	34,992	31,098	416	31,340	93.7
Serbs	6,741	5,777	4,204	3,206	2,984	2,294	1,607	4.8
Roma	146	312	434	505	322	271	219	0.6
Macedonians	43	71	36	-	21	14	6	0.0
Muslims	40	70	100	118	15	2	1	0.0
Montenegrins	14	8	19	7	2	-	1	0.0
Yugoslavs	94	18	27	35	-	1	1	0.0
Others	1,431	176	167	80	462	82	274	0.8
Total	26,738	30,057	33,948	38,943	34,904	3,080	33,449	

=== Notable people ===
- Bardhly Osmani, Albanian guerrilla separatist for the UÇPMB
- Fidan Aliti, Kosovo-Albanian footballer, national team
- Idriz Seferi, Albanian nationalist figure, born in Sefer
- Iljasa Zulfiu, Albanian-Serbian footballer

== Economy ==
The average salary in Preševo (2025) is significantly below the national net wage average.

The following table gives a preview of the total number of registered people employed in legal entities per their core activity (as of 2022):

Activity	Total
Agriculture, forestry and fishing	8
Mining and quarrying	43
Manufacturing	696
Electricity, gas, steam and air conditioning supply	2
Water supply; sewerage, waste management and remediation activities	68
Construction	231
Wholesale and retail trade, repair of motor vehicles and motorcycles	487
Transportation and storage	436
Accommodation and food services	198
Information and communication	25
Financial and insurance activities	30
Real estate activities	-
Professional, scientific and technical activities	96
Administrative and support service activities	24
Public administration and defense; compulsory social security	595
Education	690
Human health and social work activities	302
Arts, entertainment and recreation	107
Other service activities	122
Individual agricultural workers	19
Total	4,180

== Politics ==
=== Elections ===
In December 2005, the leader of the Albanian Democratic party (PDSH) Ragmi Mustafa became the president of the municipality. He was re-elected several times and served as the president of the municipality until 2016.

On 7 March 2017, the President of Albania Bujar Nishani made a historical visit to the municipalities of Preševo and Bujanovac, in which Albanians form the ethnic majority. Three days later, Ardita Sinani became the president of the municipality of Preševo, following the resignation of Shqiprim Arifi due to the termination of the municipal coalition.

=== Stele controversies 2012–13 ===
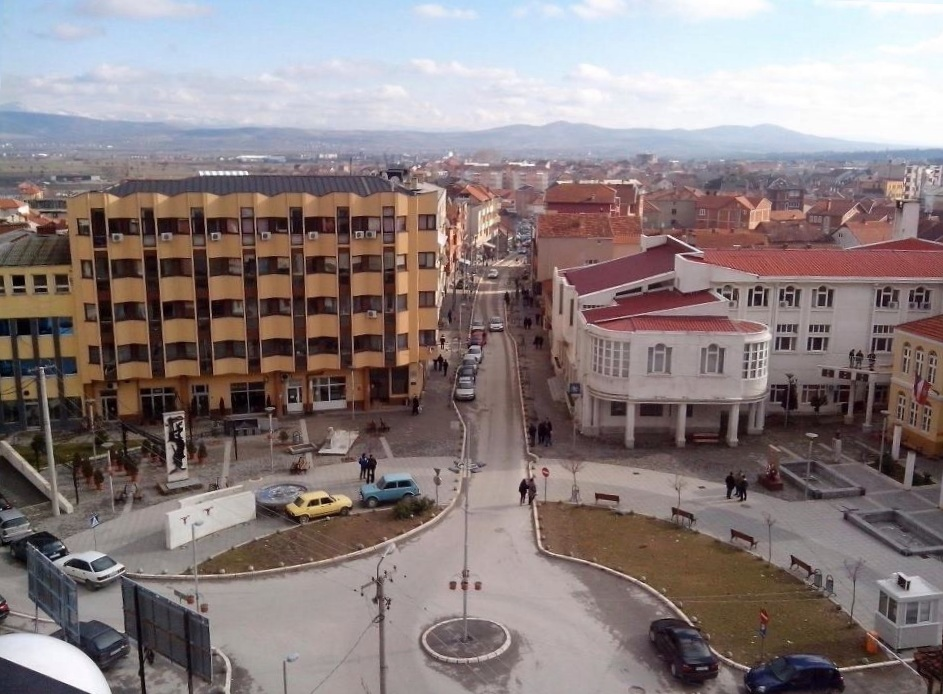
Town center of Preševo

On 21 November 2012, the municipality council of Preševo erected a stele in the center of the town honouring members of the former UÇPMB, who died during the Preševo Valley Conflict from 1999 to 2001, causing a public outcry throughout Serbia. The Prime Minister of Serbia, Ivica Dačić, said about this incident: "It's best that they remove it themselves, because this is a needless provocation, nowhere else in Europe can a memorial plaque be erected to those who are members of terrorist organizations and those who were directly involved in the murders of police officers and soldiers". He called for the removal of the stele by 17 January, then several Albanian politicians and organizations responded with criticism. Mayor of Preševo Ragmi Mustafa said that the stele shows the identity of the Albanians in the region and announced that it would end the cooperation with national authorities of Serbia if the monument were removed. Serbian Minister of Defence Aleksandar Vučić announced that they will act in frame of the law in connection with the controversial stele, and that no one can act against them for all are under the same applicable constitution. He added that Serbia wants peace but will respond to any provocation.

Deputies of the Assembly of Kosovo Rexhep Selimi and Nait Hasani, a former member of the Kosovo Liberation Army (UÇK), threatened armed conflict if the institutions of Serbia removed the memorial plaque. The former U.S. diplomat, United Nations regional representative of Mitrovica Gerard Gallucci said: "Serbs, do not fall for provocations like this with the memorial plaque in Preševo". President of the National Assembly of Serbia Nebojša Stefanović explained that it is unacceptable that in Serbia there is a memorial plaque to a terrorist organization and those who killed the citizens of Serbia. He added that is not an ethnic conflict, but the problem is the honoring of those who killed Serbs with a memorial plaque in Serbia. Nevertheless, a member of the Coalition of Albanians of the Preševo Valley, Jonuz Musliu, which has one seat in the Parliament of Serbia, said that the stele would not be removed. However, the stele was removed by a bulldozer which was guarded by members of the Serbian Gendarmery on 20 January 2013. Despite threats from various Albanian nationalist organizations, there were no incidents during and after the removal.

As a first reaction, the former commander of UÇPMB, Orhan Rexhepi, made the separatist statement that this is a "historic day", because "Preševo and Bujanovac will be a part of Kosovo." Ragmi Mustafa, Preševo's Mayor, confirmed shortly afterwards that the Albanians want a union with Kosovo for a long time.

The former president of the National Council for Cooperation with the Hague Tribunal and a minister in Serbian government Rasim Ljajić responded and said that the Preševo valley will not be part of Kosovo or may be because the Albanian representatives from southern Serbia do not have the support of the international community. He also warned against the exploitation of the situation by the Albanians. The operation of the Serbian police broke into the local population from turmoil. During the day, several hundred people gathered at the site of the stele and laid flowers and candles in memory of the fallen UÇPMB members. The Albanian prime minister, Sali Berisha, announced that "the Albanian government calls the international institutions to stop this action", even though the U.S. had already announced earlier that it is an internal affair of Serbia, which should solve their elected representatives.

On the evening of 20 January, a group of Albanians who protested against the removal of the stele gathered in Gjakova. Some of them forcibly tried to enter in the Serbian monastery of the Holy Virgin, where several nuns still live, but the attack was prevented by the KFOR and Kosovo police. On the night of 21 January, the group reconviened at the Serbian enclave Goraždevac, were the monuments of the Serb victims of the NATO bombing in 1999, and the Serbian children who were shot at the Bistrica river by Albanians in 2003 was desecrated and destroyed. Thousands of Preševo citizens rallied on 21 January 2013, to protest the removal of the stele dedicated to Albanian guerrillas. Serbian prime minister Ivica Dačić said that there was no reason for any kind of protests, the illicit stele was not destroyed, nor was violence used. He added that "I doubt that in the United States, Al-Qaeda veterans, or those who have carried out several terrorist attacks in London or Paris, would decide whether a memorial stele should be built." The Albanian prime minister Sali Berisha announced, during a press conference in Tirana, that Albania would review its relations with Serbia, if that is necessary. He also stated that the Albanian government will do everything in his power to help the Albanians in Serbia. Albin Kurti, leader of the political party Vetëvendosje said instead, that greatest responsible for this situation is more likely in Kosovo, the government of Hashim Thaçi.

In response to the removal of the stele, dozens of Albanians, led by former UÇK veterans, destroyed a memorial plaque from the World War II in Viti with a crane, and were not prevented by the Kosovo Police. Till the evening of 21 January, over 140 Serbian gravestones were destroyed throughout Kosovo. A chapel and several crosses were also burned. Subsequently, representatives of the United States, the European Union, as well as the OSCE, KFOR and EULEX, sharply condemned the destruction of Serbian monuments and tombs. They added that there is no justification for this violence, and that such actions were totally unacceptable.

== See also ==
- List of places in Serbia
- Albanians in Serbia

== Notes ==
a.	In the municipality of Preševo there was undercoverage of the census units owing to the boycott by most of the members of the Albanian ethnic community.
