= Zhegër =

Zhegër Жегра Žegra
- Village
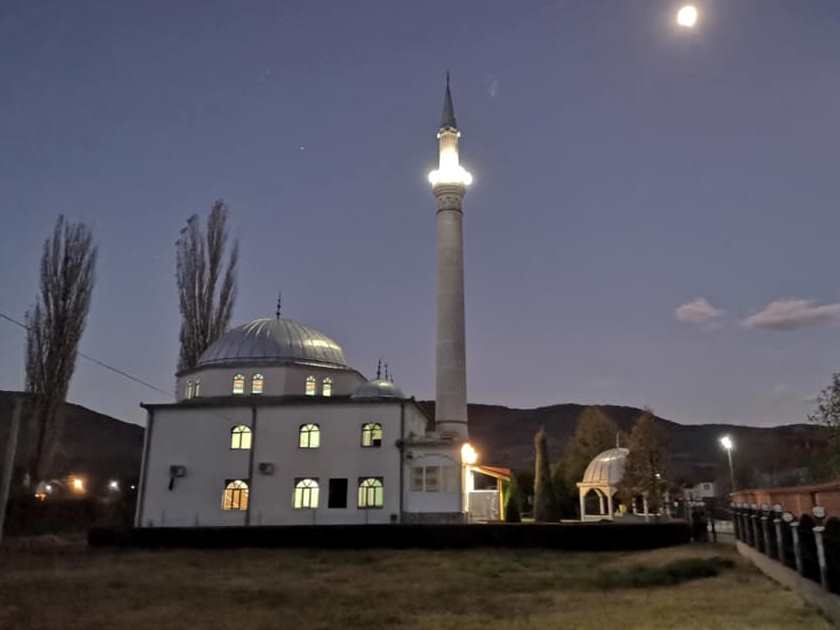
- A mosque in Zhegër
- Interactive map of Zhegër
- Location in Kosovo
- Coordinates: 42°22′14″N 21°29′6″E
- Country: Kosovo
- District: Gjilan
- Municipality: Gjilan

Population (2024)
  - Total: 2,655
- Time zone: UTC+1 (CET)
  - Summer (DST): UTC+2 (CEST)

Zhegër (in Albanian) or Žegra (in Serbian; Жегра) is a village in the Gjilan district of Kosovo. It is located in the Karadak region on the banks of the Žegra river, a right tributary of the Binačka Morava, at the foot of Kušljevica (614 m), on both sides of the road towards Donja Budriga.

== Etymology ==
Žegra is mentioned for the first time as a place of residence in the charter of King Milutin when it was handed over to the Gračanica Monastery, then in the charter of Empress Milica with her sons, in 1393. The village was a feudal holding of the monastery to which it paid a regular tribute. On the occasion of the appointment of the mezhds of the village of Livoç, in Mikel Lluakri's book in the 15th century, it is mentioned as Segra, while in the 1455 Ottoman register of Vëllk Vilayet, it is mentioned as Zhipa, which according to the settlements for the district, as the researcher Sherafedin Kadriu states, turns out to be Zhegër.

== History ==
On 13 April 1999, during the Kosovo War, ethnic Albanians from the village were reportedly expelled by Yugoslav forces. After the end of the war, some 500 ethnic Serbs fled from the village. The United Nations High Commissioner for Refugees (UNHCR) estimated that prior to the war they constituted 10% of the majority ethnic Albanian village.

The village was the site of a clash between armed Serbs and U.S. Marines from the Kosovo Force (KFOR) on 23 June 1999, in the aftermath of the war, in which the Marines killed three people.

== Geography ==
The settlement of Zhegër is located near the border of North Macedonia, at the foot of the Karadak Mountains, and is rich in fertile land. It has an elongated shape (3.7 km), along the Karadak River and lies in the southeastern part of Kosovo, in the triangle between Kosovo, Serbia and North Macedonia. The suitable geographical position enables a good access to other centers of Kosovo and the region.

Cadastral areas within the local community in Zhegër are: Demiraj, Haxhaj, Kurexh, Selisht and Terziaj

== Economy ==
As in other parts of Kosovo, Zhegër faces high unemployment. The individual household sector employs a significant number of residents, mainly engaged in agriculture and animal husbandry.

== Demographics ==
The 2011 Kosovo census recorded 3,327 inhabitants, nearly all of whom were ethnic Albanians.

== Notable people ==
- Agim Ramadani, KLA commander
- Xherdan Shaqiri (born 1991) a Swiss professional footballer who plays for Swiss Super Ligue club FC Basel and Switzerland.
