= Pčinja District =

Administrative district of Serbia

Pčinja District Пчињски округ
- Administrative district of Serbia
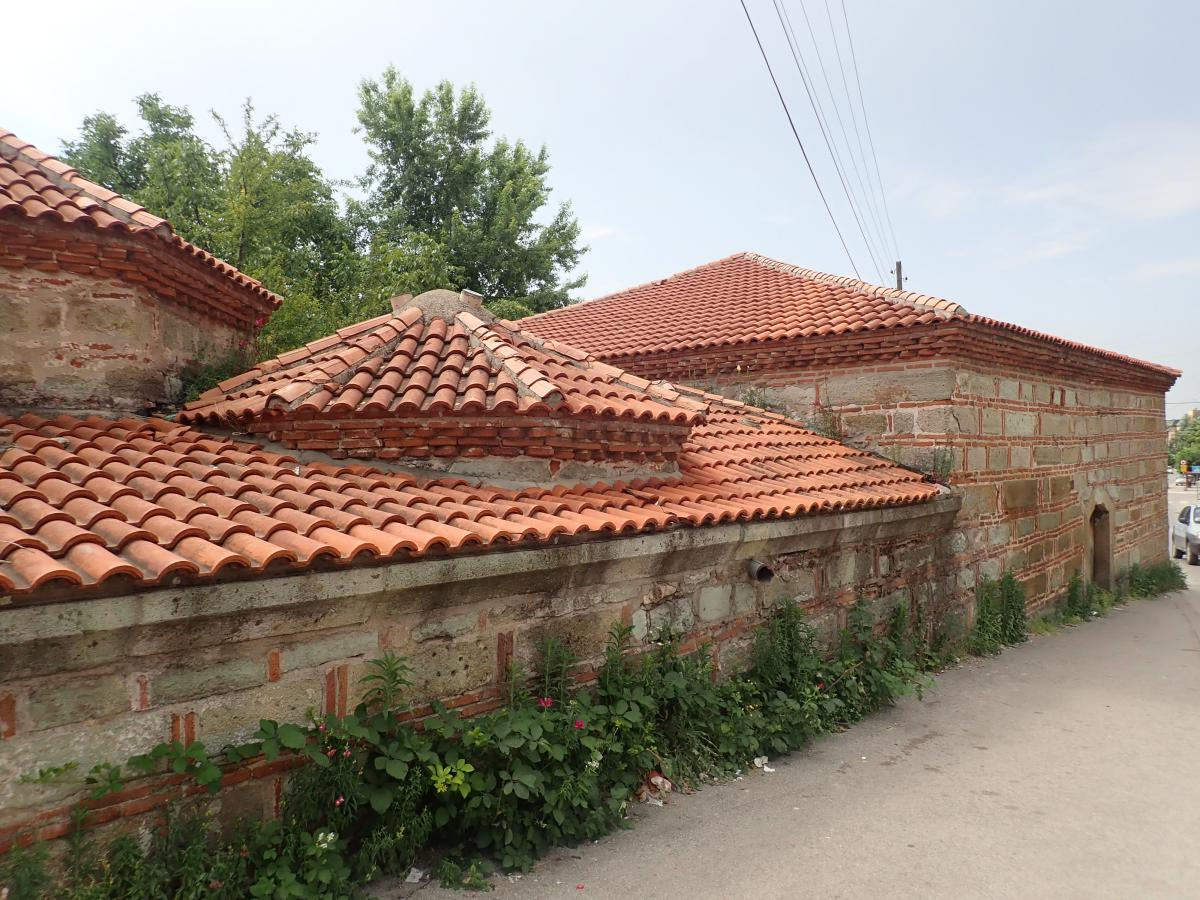
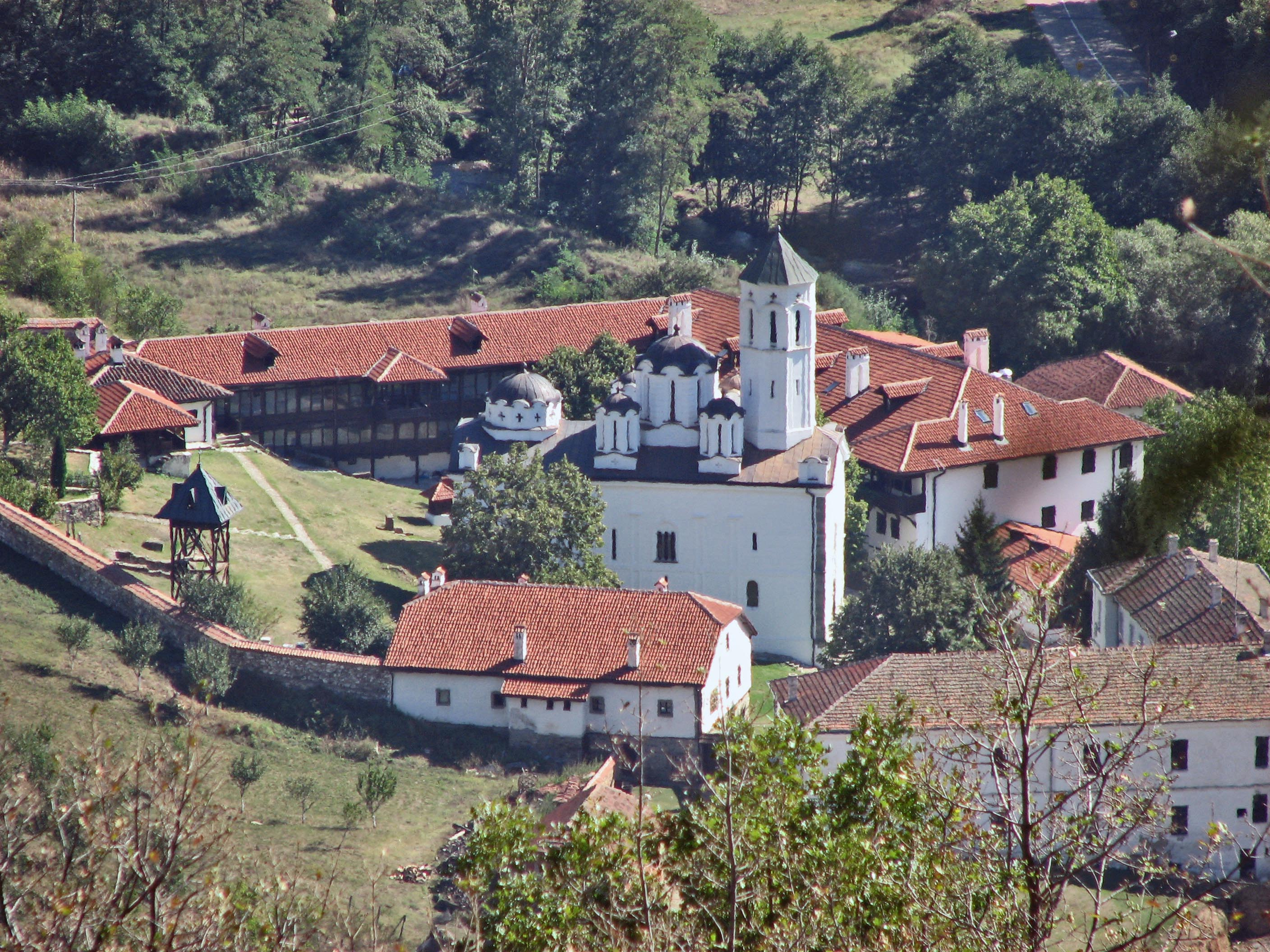
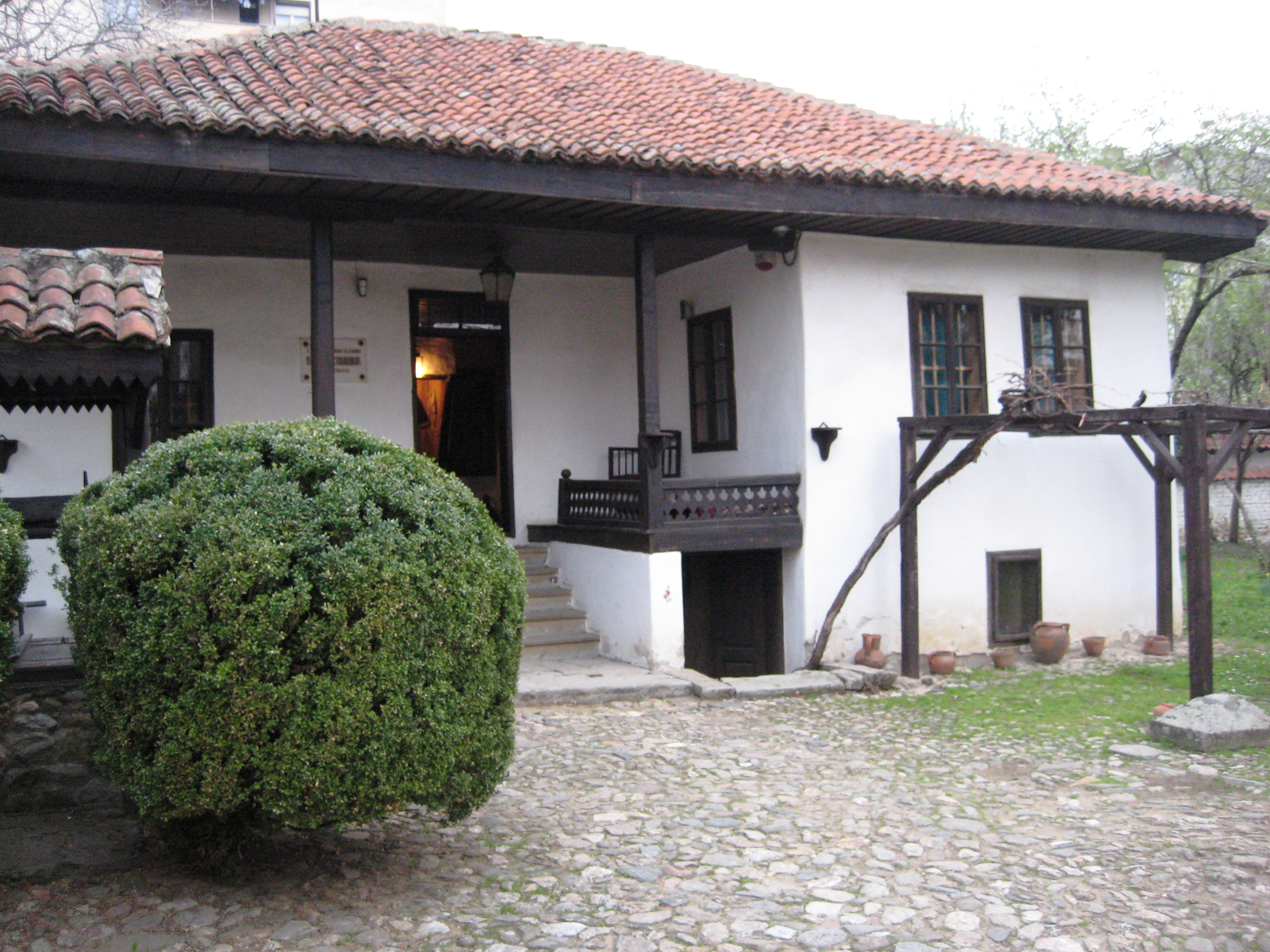
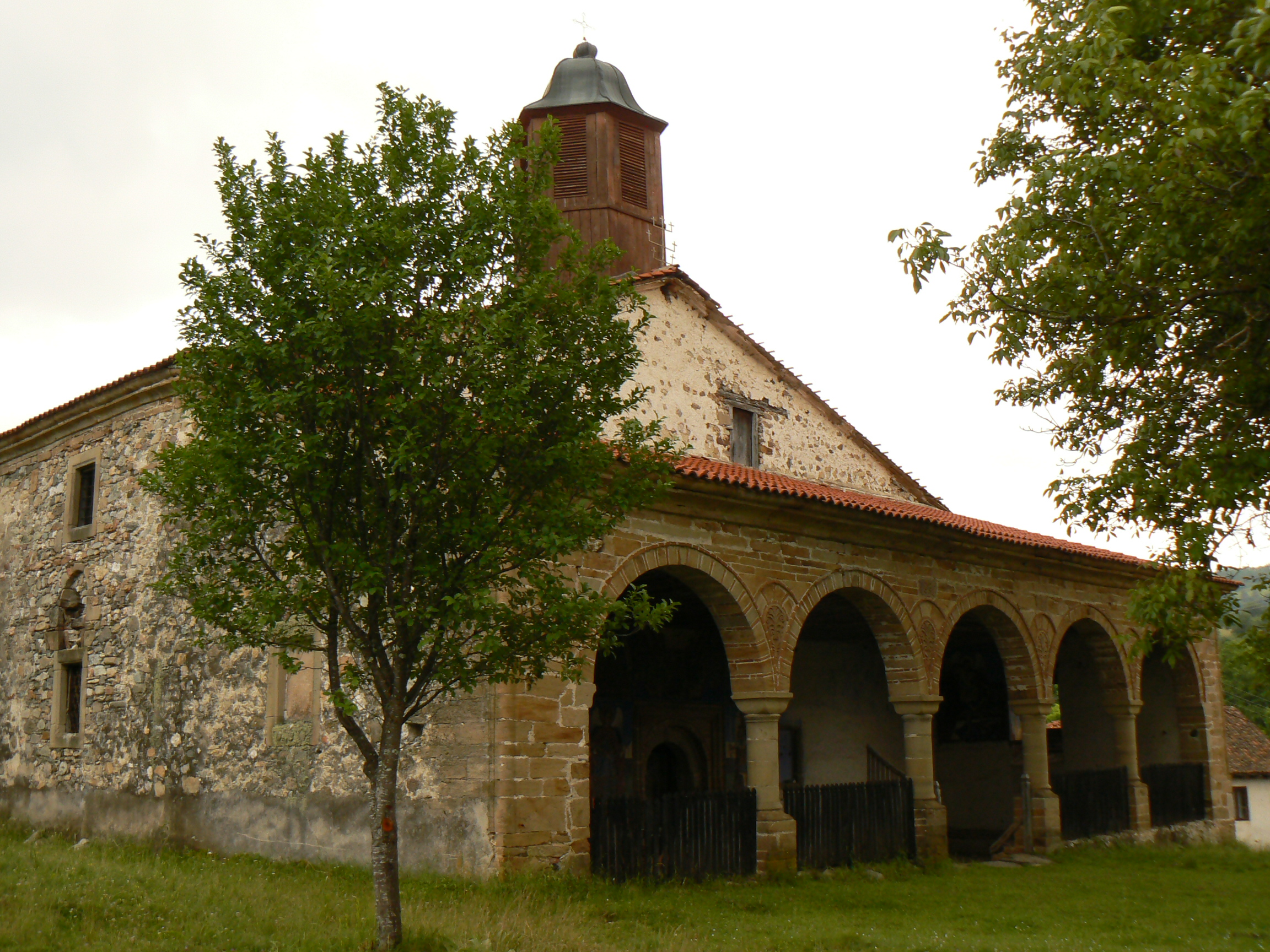
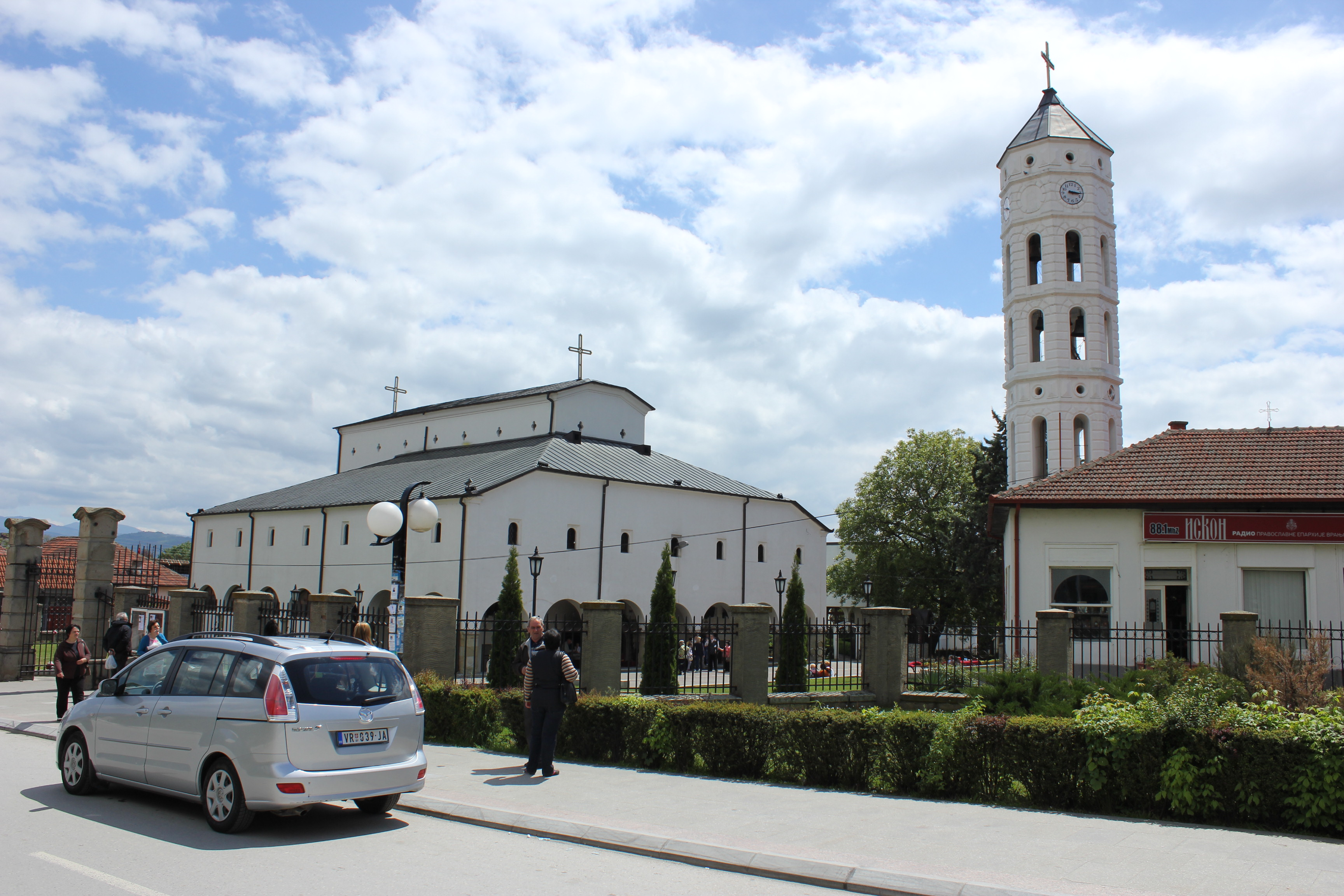
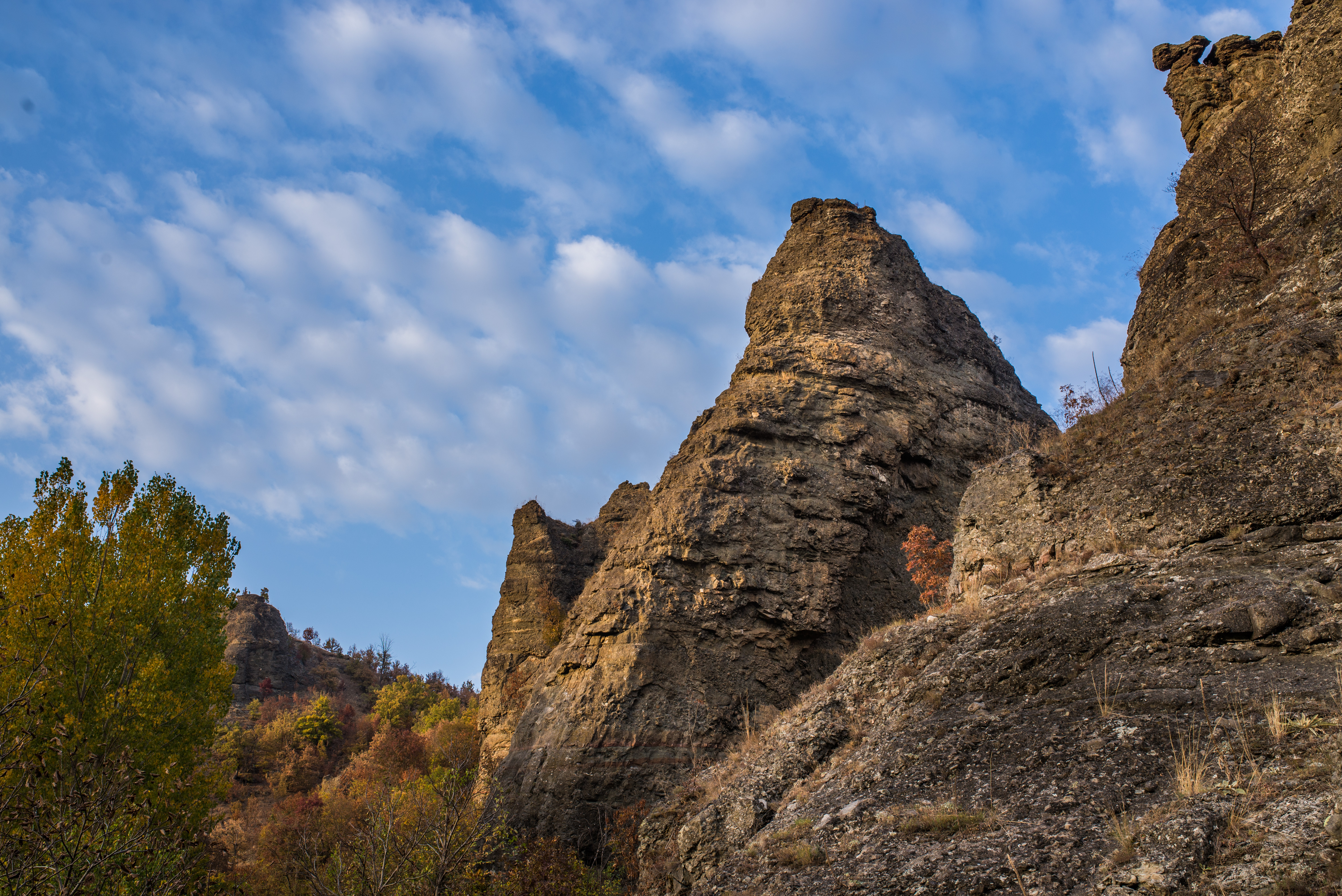
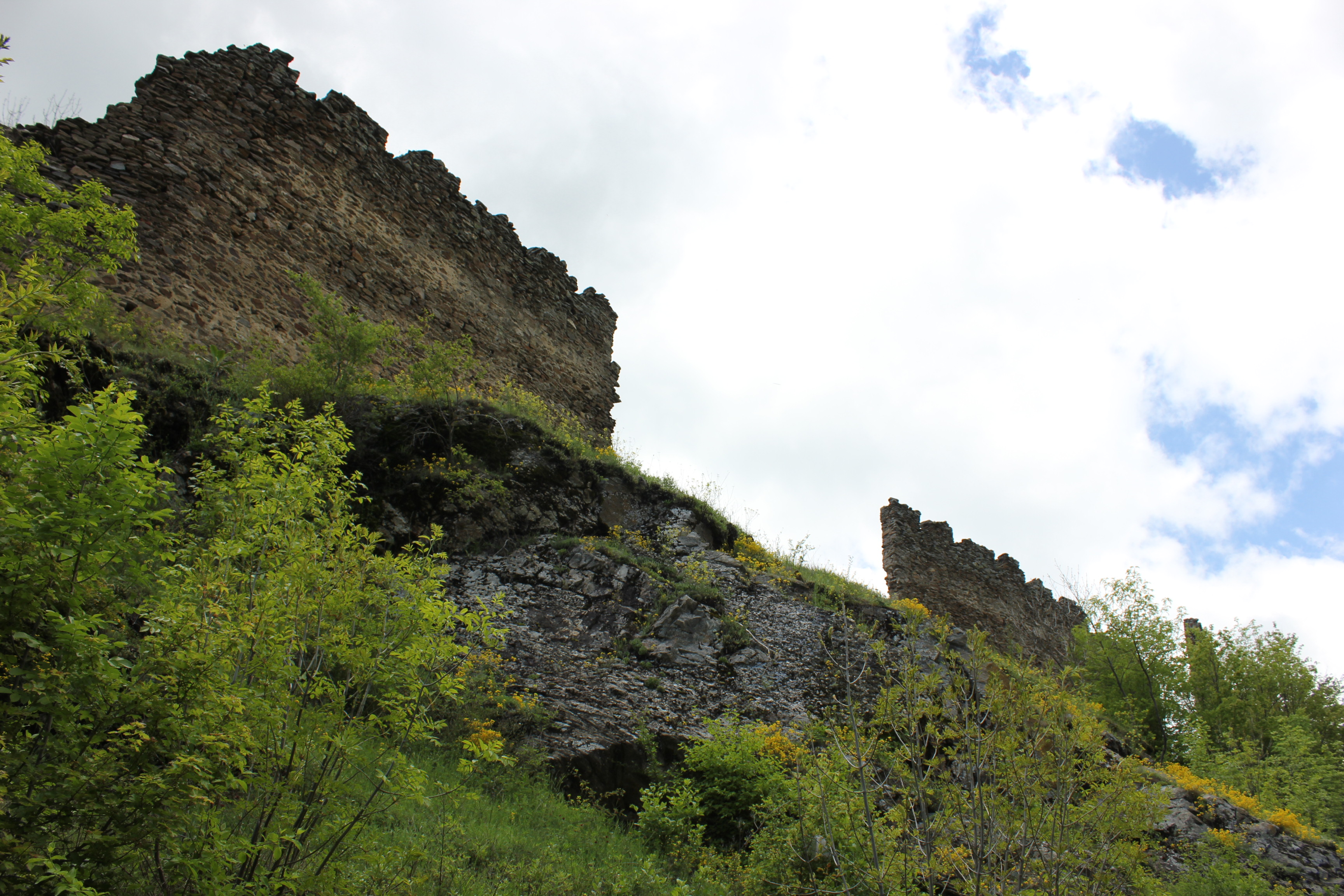
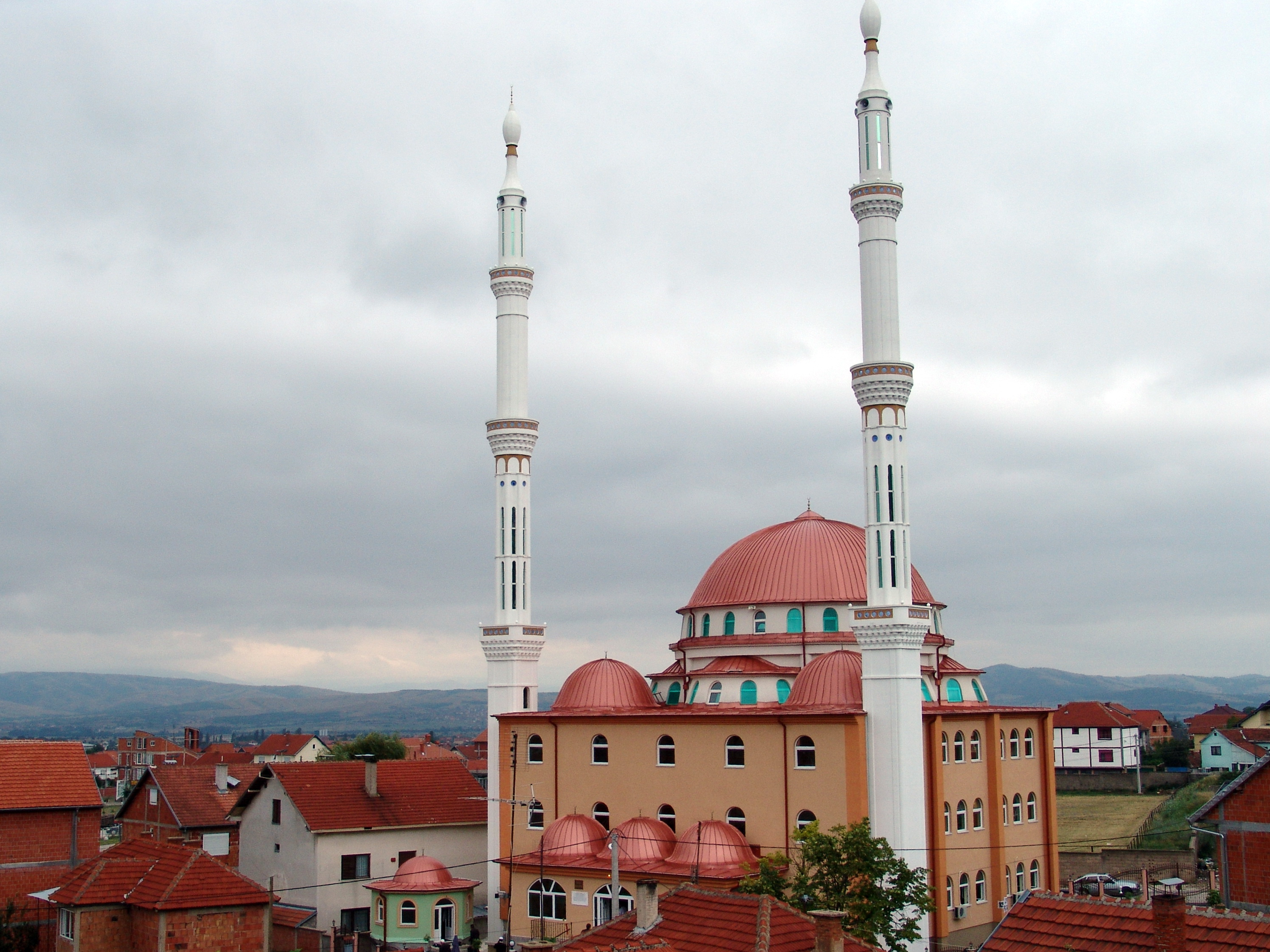
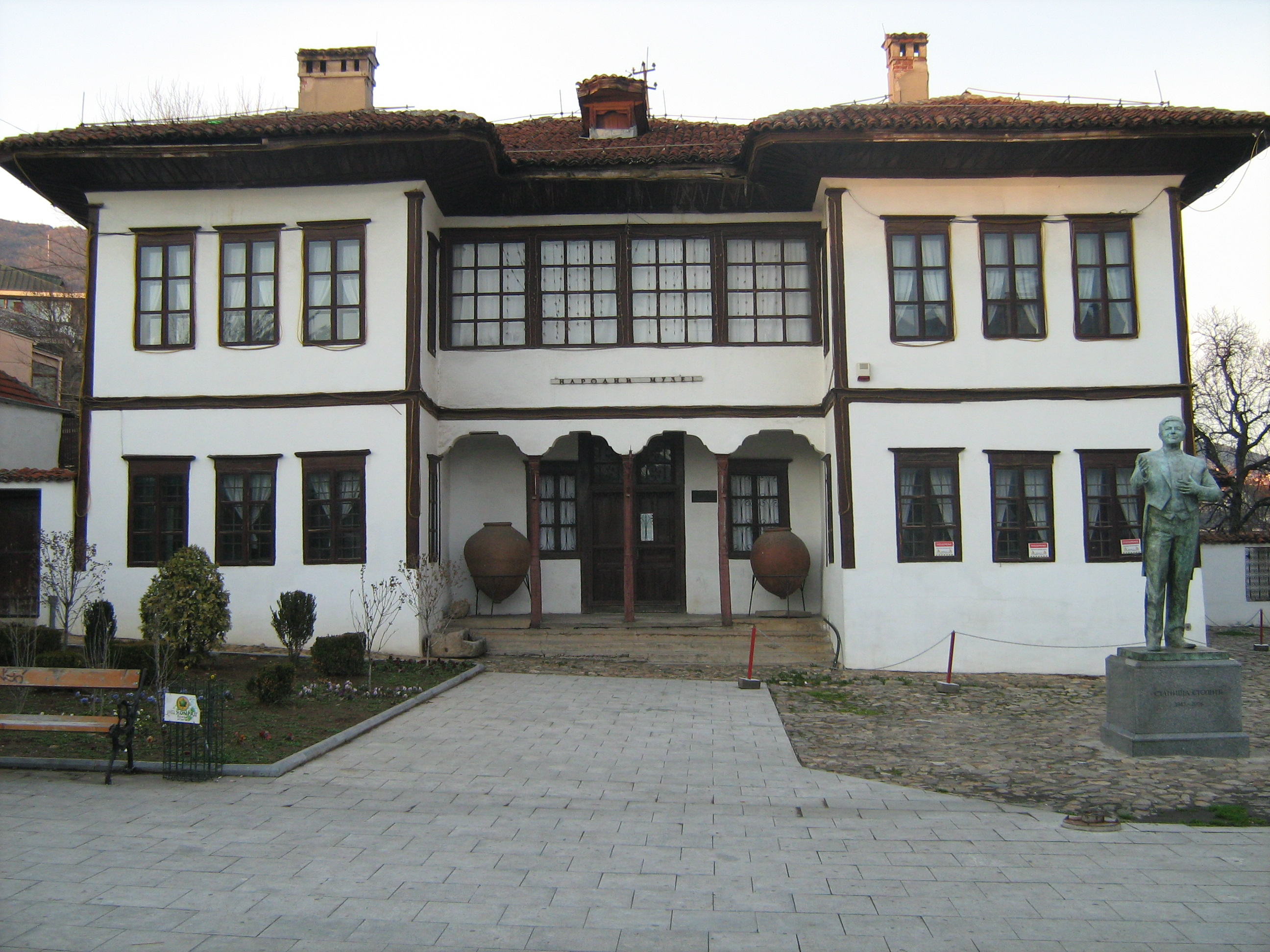
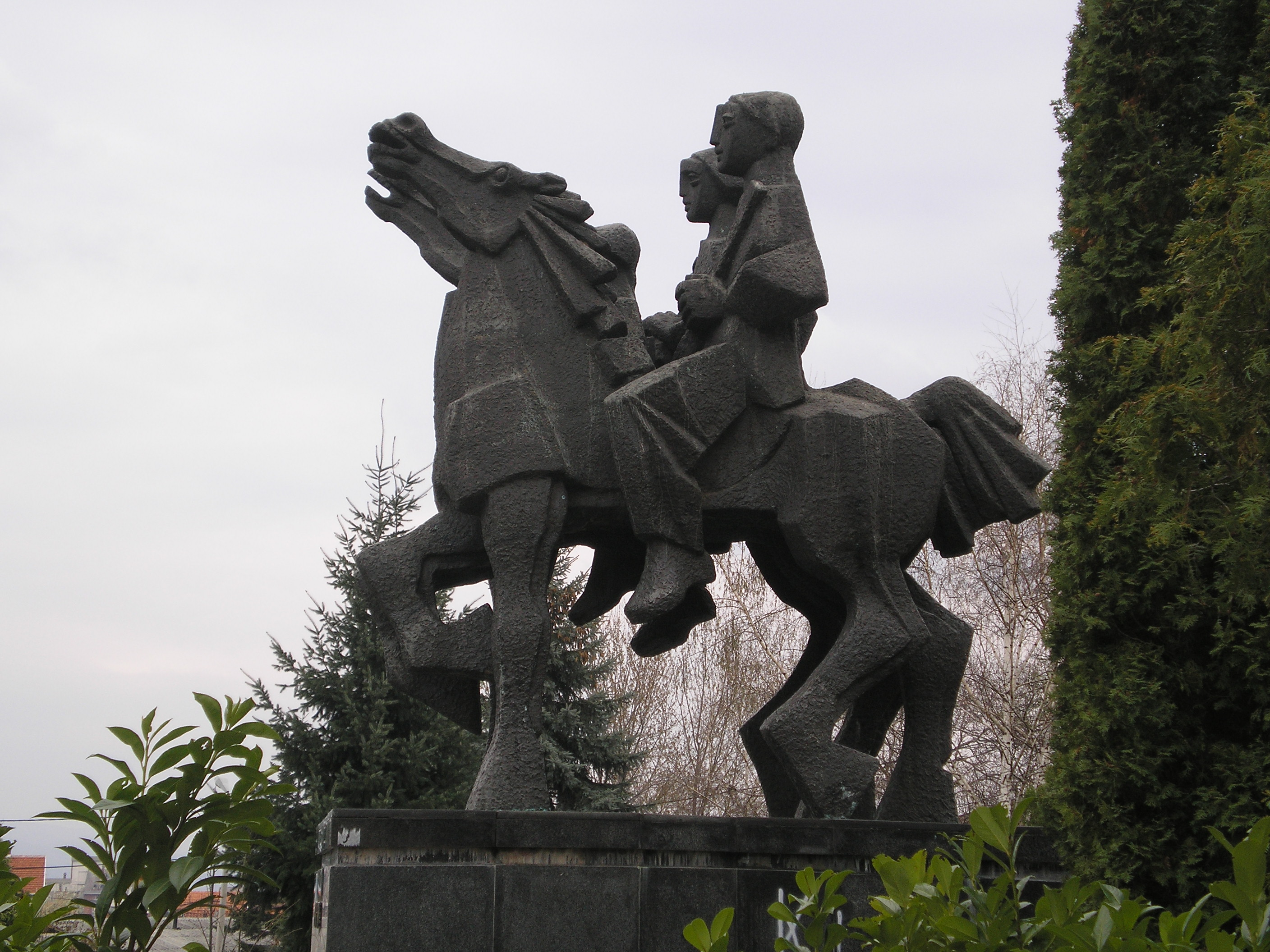
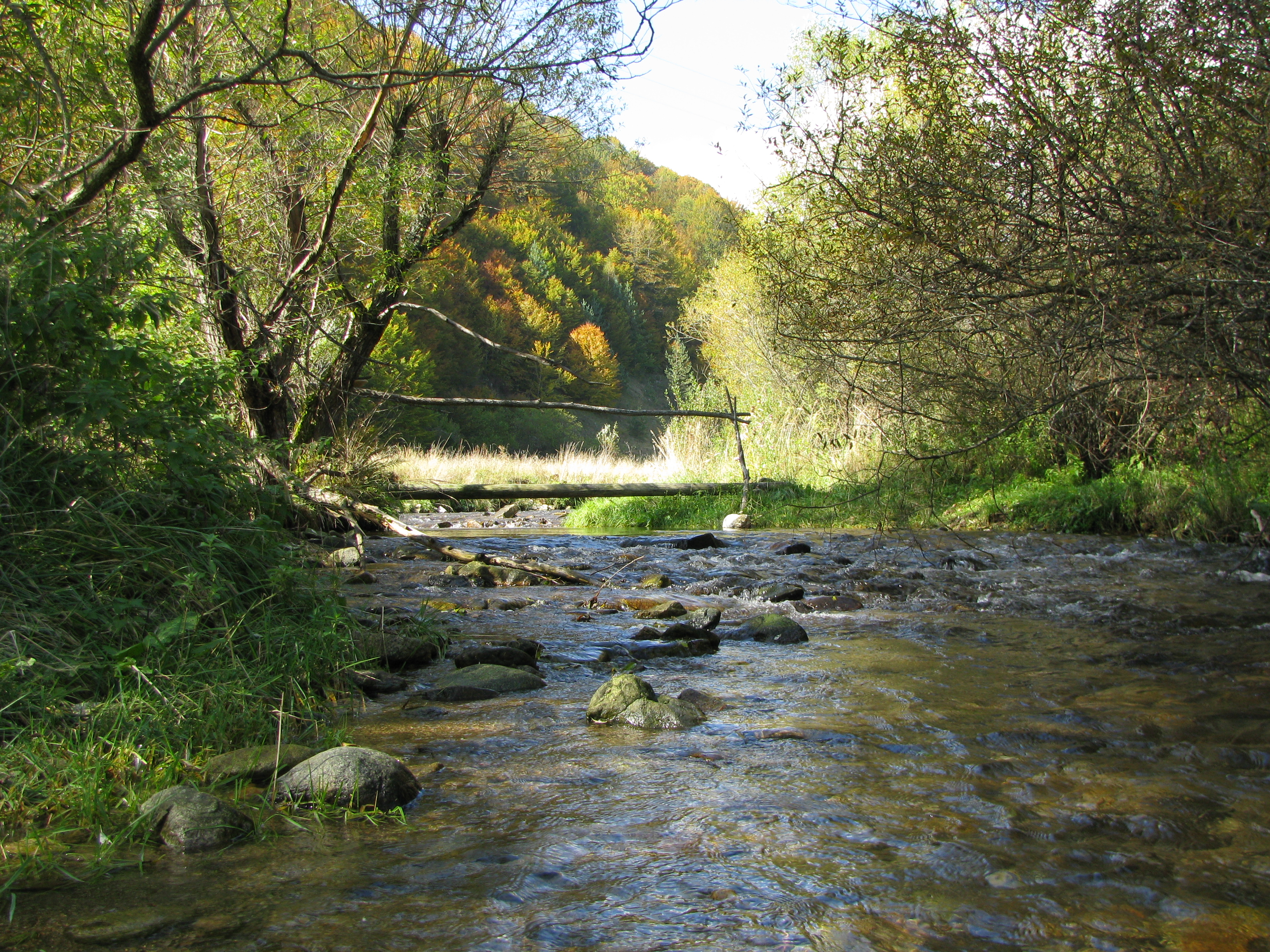
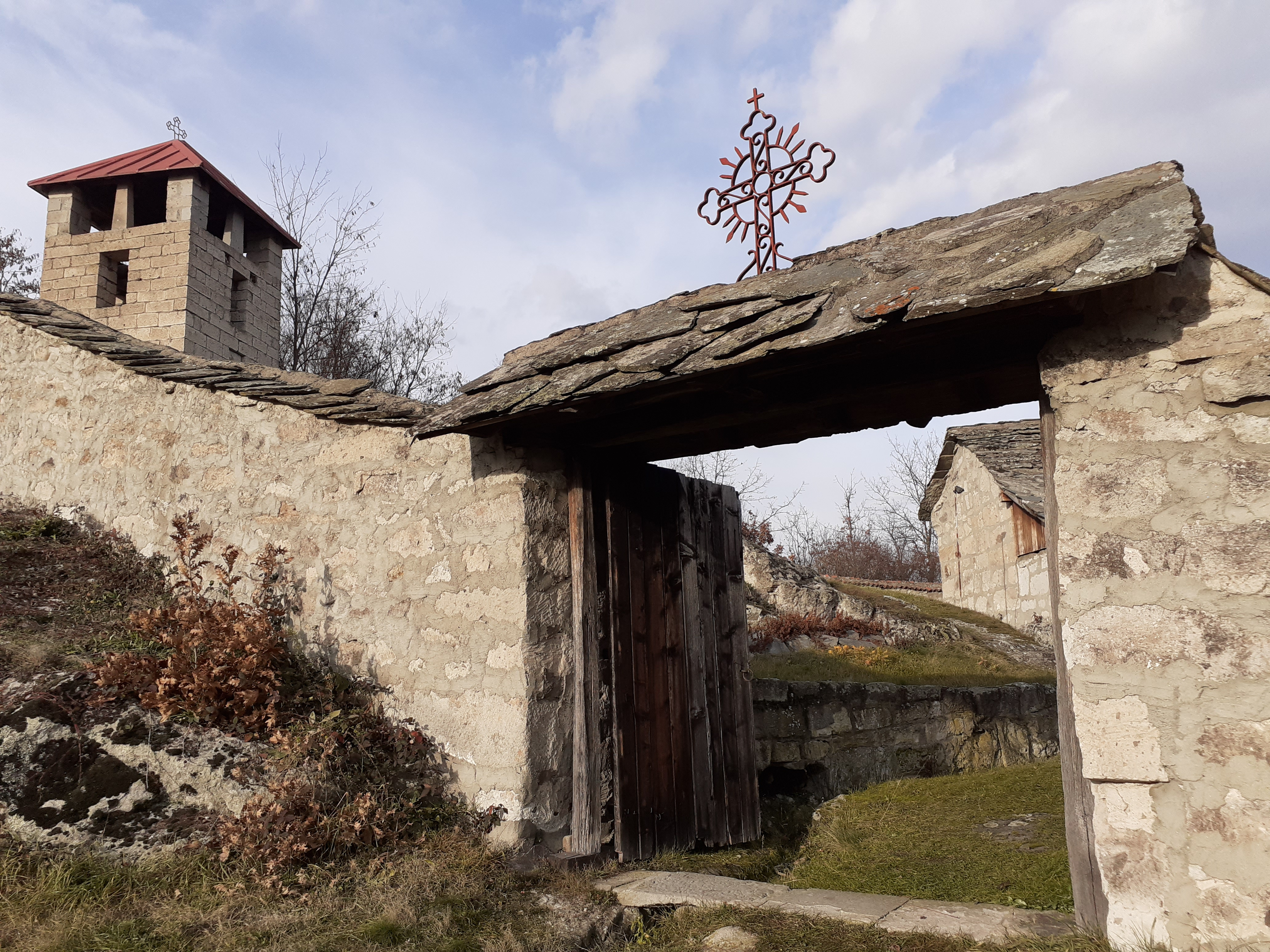
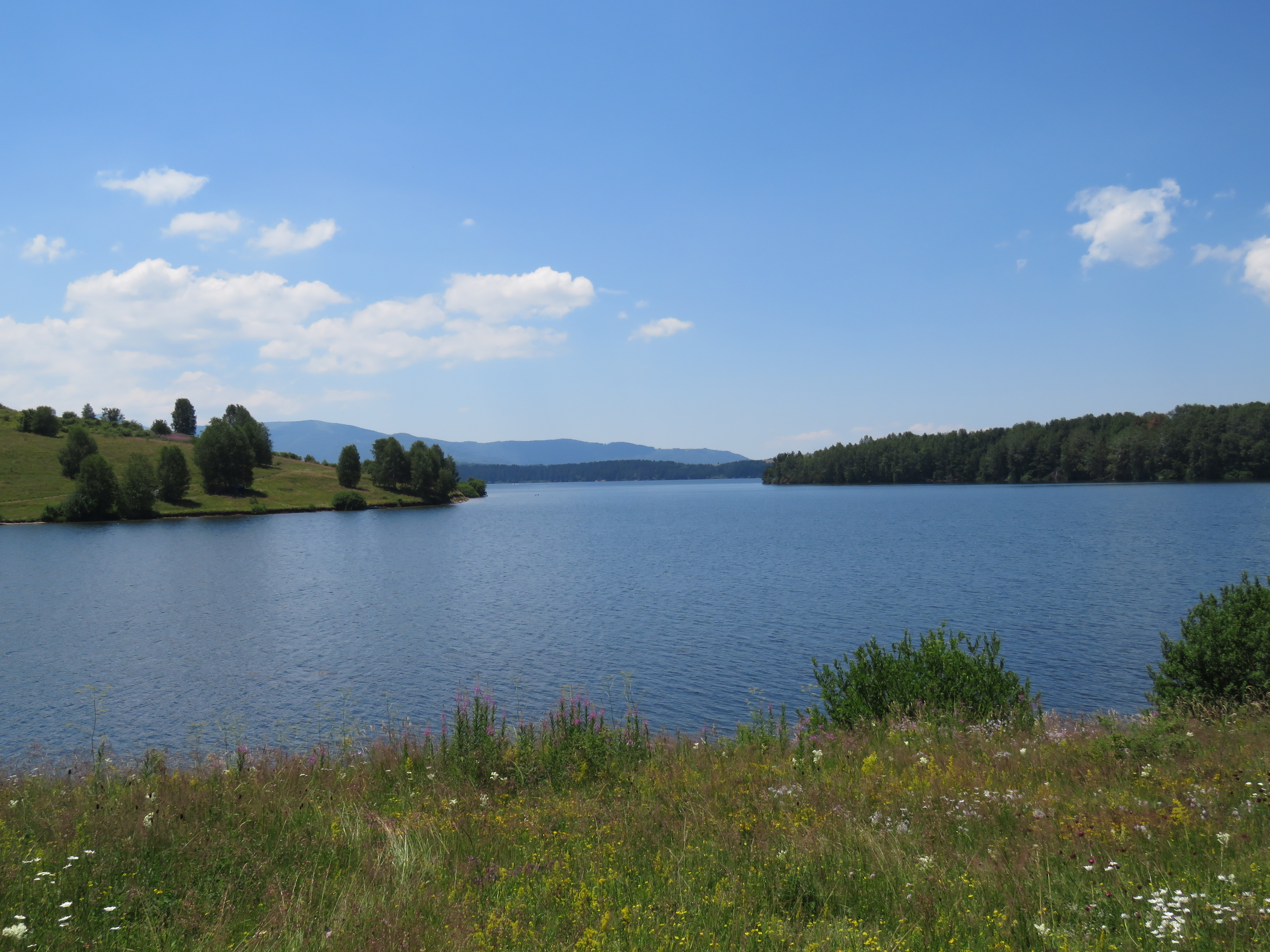
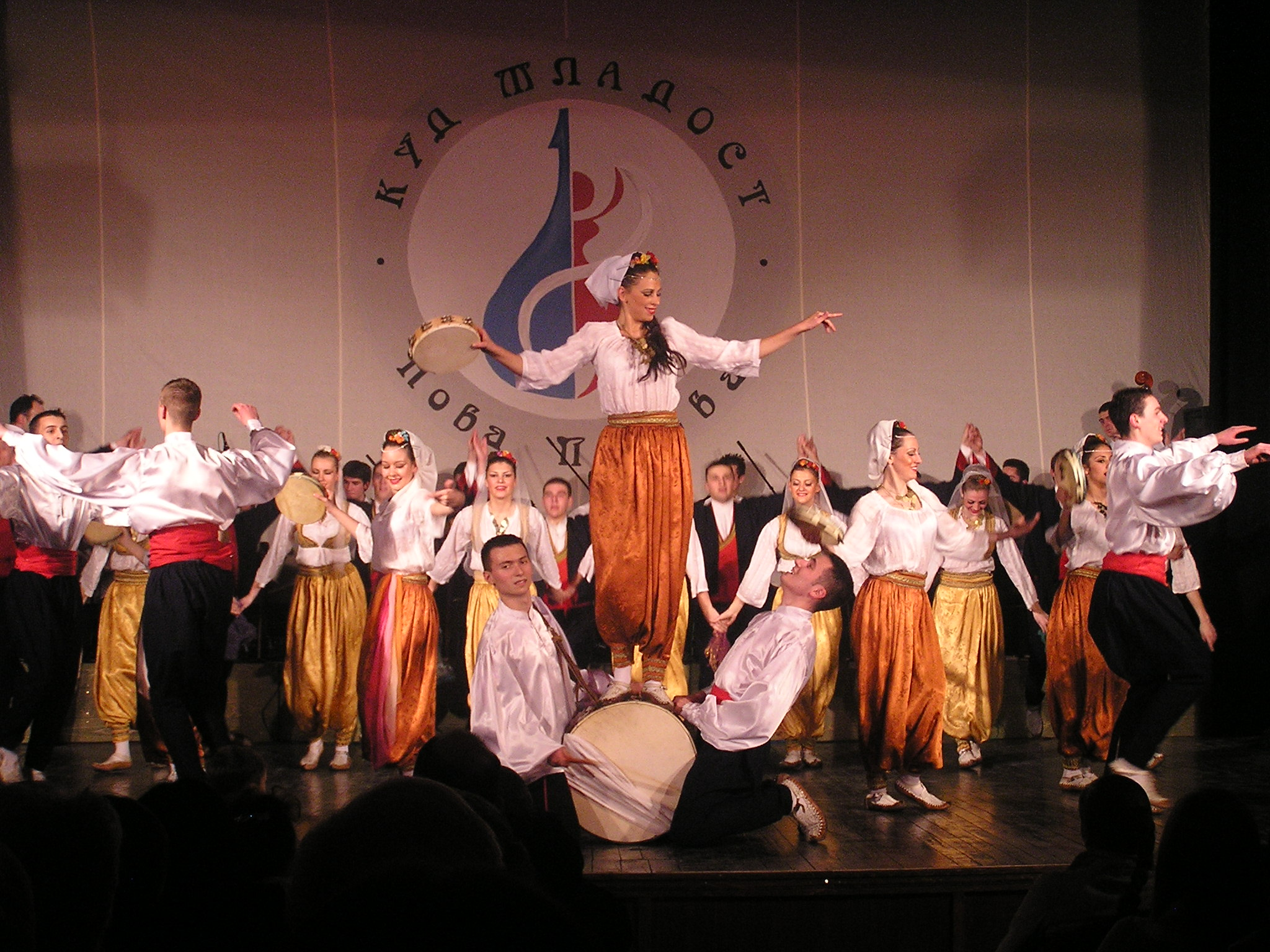
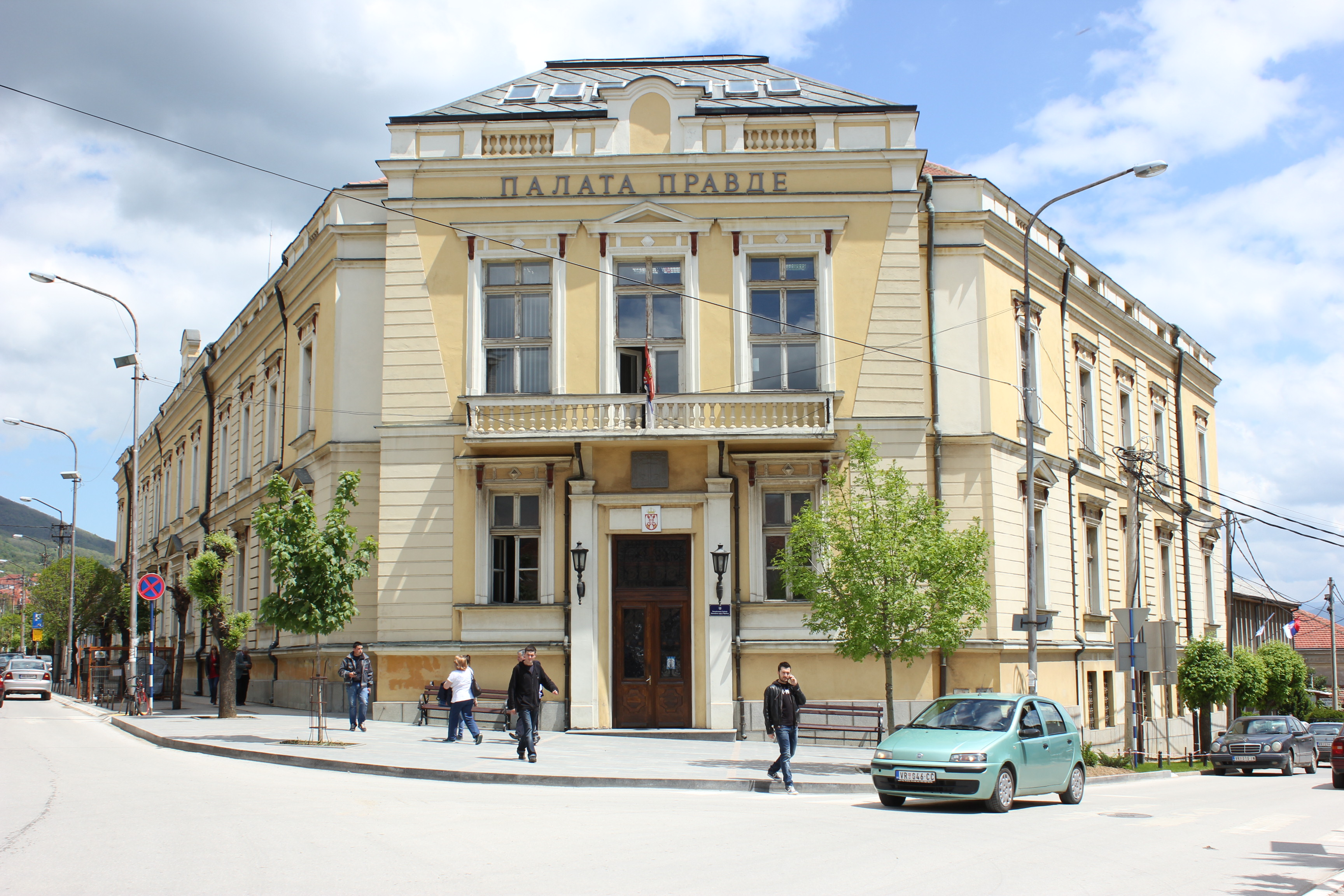
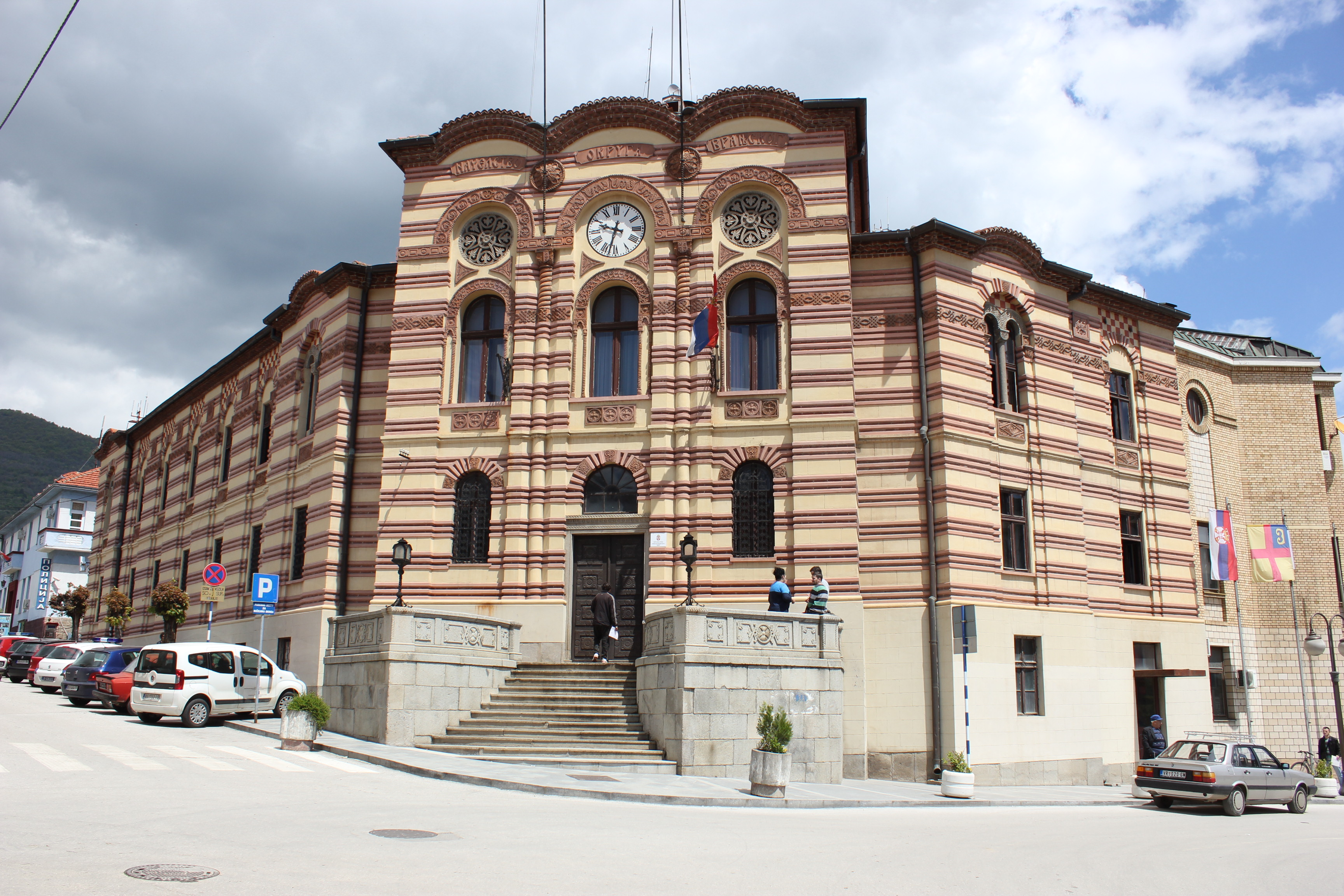
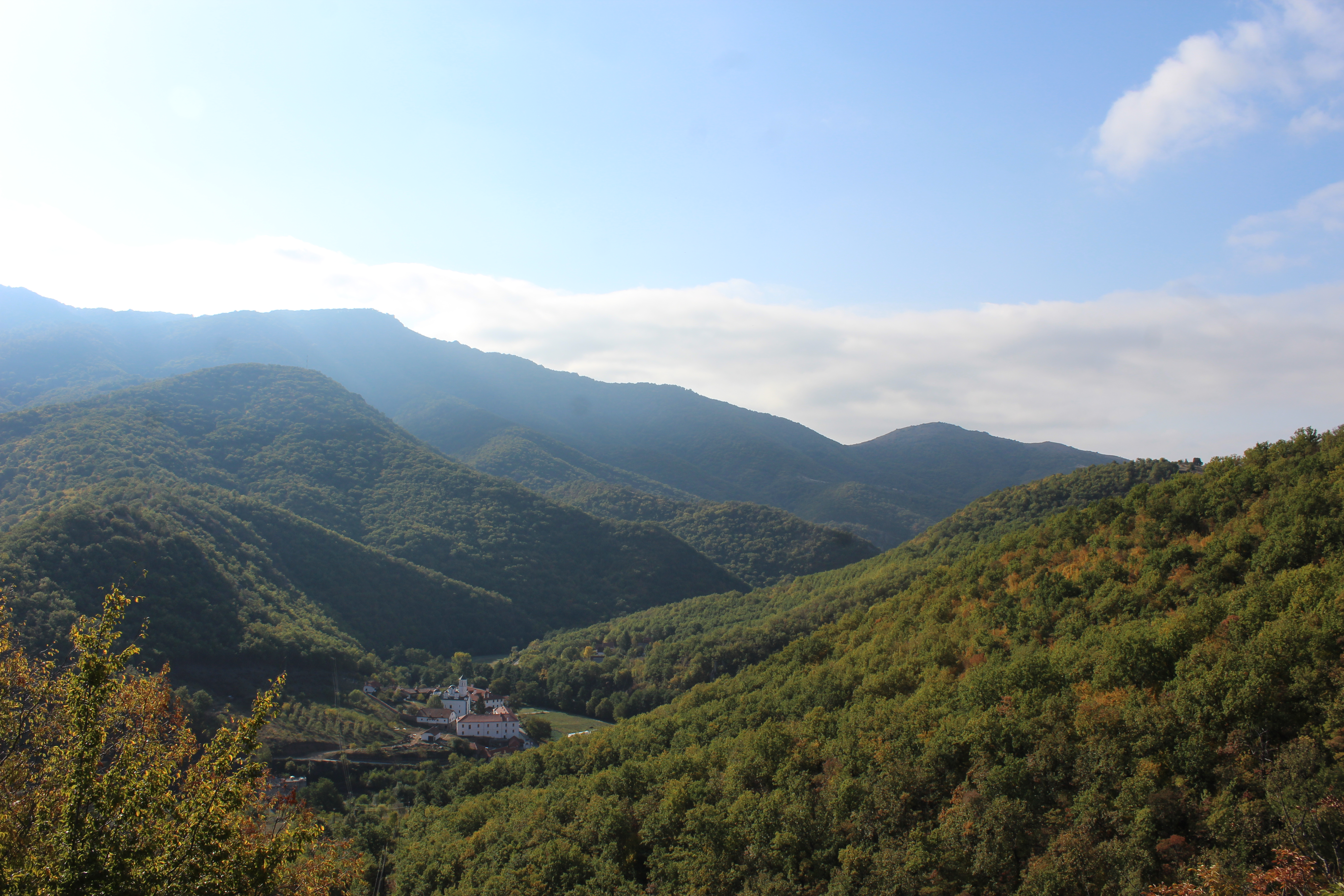
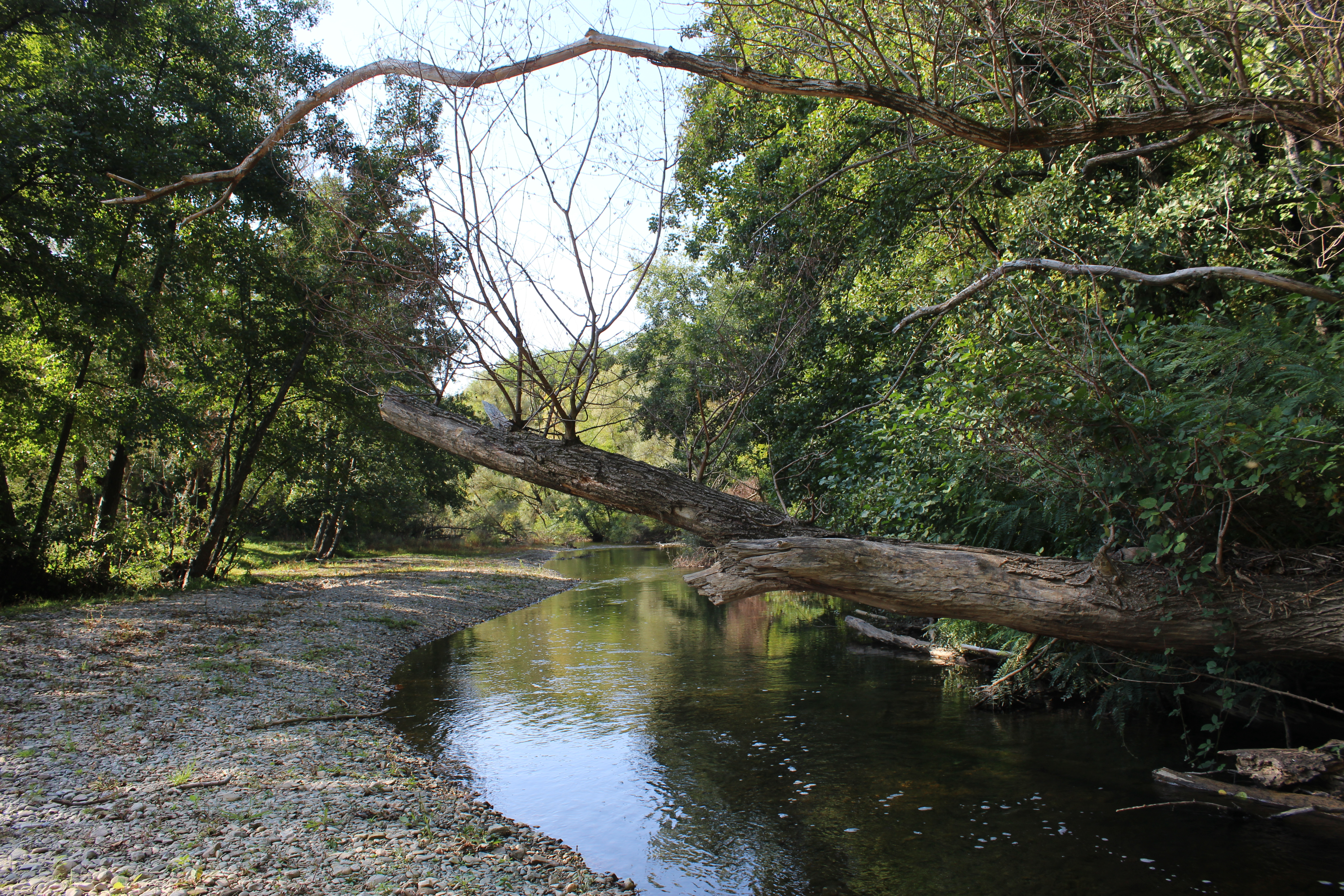
- Images from the Pčinja District

- Location of district in Serbia
- Coordinates: 42°33′N 21°54′E
- Country: Serbia
- Administrative center: Vranje

Government
  - Commissioner: Srećko Pejković

Area
  - Total: 3,520 km^{2} (1,360 sq mi)

Population (2022)
  - Total: 193,802
  - Density: 55.1/km^{2} (143/sq mi)
- ISO 3166 code: RS-24
- Municipalities: 6 and 1 city
- Settlements: 363
  - Cities and towns: 6
  - Villages: 357
- Website: pcinjski.okrug.gov.rs

The Pčinja District (Serbian: Пчињски округ, romanized: Pčinjski okrug, pronounced [ptʃǐɲskiː ôkruːɡ]) is one of administrative districts of Serbia. It occupies the southernmost part of the country. According to the 2022 census, it has a population of 193,802 inhabitants. The administrative center of the Pčinja District is the city of Vranje.

== History ==
The present-day administrative districts (including Pčinja District) were established in 1992 by the decree of the Government of Serbia.

== Cities and municipalities ==
The district encompasses one city and seven municipalities:

- Vranje (city)
- Bosilegrad (municipality)
- Bujanovac (municipality)
- Preševo (municipality)
- Surdulica (municipality)
- Trgovište (municipality)
- Vladičin Han (municipality)
- Vranjska Banja (municipality)

== Demographics ==
Historical population
| Year | Pop. | ±% |
|---|---|---|
| 1948 | 209,232 | — |
| 1953 | 220,910 | +5.6% |
| 1961 | 222,520 | +0.7% |
| 1971 | 230,373 | +3.5% |
| 1981 | 238,753 | +3.6% |
| 1991 | 243,529 | +2.0% |
| 2002 | 227,690 | −6.5% |
| 2011^{[a]} | 159,081 | −30.1% |
| 2021 | 193,802 | +21.8% |

=== Towns ===
There are three towns with over 10,000 inhabitants.

- Vranje: 51,163
- Preševo: 19,515
- Bujanovac: 19,515

=== Ethnic structure ===
| Ethnicity | Population | Share |
|---|---|---|
| Serbs | 112,011 | 57.8% |
| Albanians | 56,834 | 29.3% |
| Roma | 10,877 | 5.6% |
| Bulgarians | 4,970 | 2.5% |
| Others | 1,711 | 0.9% |
| Undeclared/Unknown | 8,102 | 4.2% |

== See also ==
- Administrative districts of Serbia
- Administrative divisions of Serbia
