= Gërmova Mosque =

Cultural heritage monument of Kosovo

- Xhamia e Gërmovës (Albanian)
- Interactive map of Gërmova Mosque
- Location: Gërmova, Vitina, Kosovo

History
- Built: 1827

The Gërmova Mosque is a cultural heritage monument in Gërmova, Vitina, Kosovo.

The mosque is built of wood with clay mortar. The adobe walls were raised later during an extension project in the 1960s. Ali Tërziqi of Požaranje is responsible for the roof, Mulla Mehmet of Smirë for the railings of the müezzin mahfili, and carpenter Nazim Buzhala for the ceiling moldings.

Different dates have been suggested for construction, including the 14th century and 1447, but serious scholarship doubts origins prior to the mid-18th century. The discrepancy may come from local memory of an older mosque on whose foundations the current one was built, complicating preservation efforts.

== Description ==
The mosque has 9 square windows are at different heights: the two lower ones on the northern façade were closed by the congregation due to vandalism by individuals throwing bottles of brandy or beer, requiring a guard of two to three during services especially on holidays. The rectangular mosque is 7.35 metres (24.1 ft) by 11.4 metres (37 ft), its stone foundations contrasting with the adobe walls. The four-layer roof conforms to the local fashion, lacking a minaret. While the prayer hall has a mihrab, minbar, and mahfili, it lacks a dikka or lectern. The mihrab faces the qibla (direction of Mecca) and features floral decoration on both sides, otherwise only distinguishing itself from the remainder of the wall through engraving since both are white, though the mihrab may have once have been colored something else. The minbar is separated from the wall as in most mosques of its day and features wooden decorations with a few glass beads inside. Both the minbar and mahfili are made of oak wood. The minbar features geometric motifs that once included a hexagram facing toward the middle of the prayer hall. Meanwhile, the mahfili was built from 1969 to 1970 and is studded with wooden boards and handrails shaped like fish scales or crescent moons.

Two stone inscriptions found in the old portico’s foundations are now featured in the mosque's courtyard. National registry expert Qazim Nasami believes them to be old since they accompanied a standalone altar. Though heavily damaged, the inscriptions include seamless calligraphy that would be lost if they are threatened by construction in the courtyard corner where they now stand. Renovations were required by roof leaks.
