= Saint Joseph's Church, Viti =

Cultural heritage monument of Kosovo

Saint Joseph's Church
- Kisha e Shën Jozefit (Albanian)
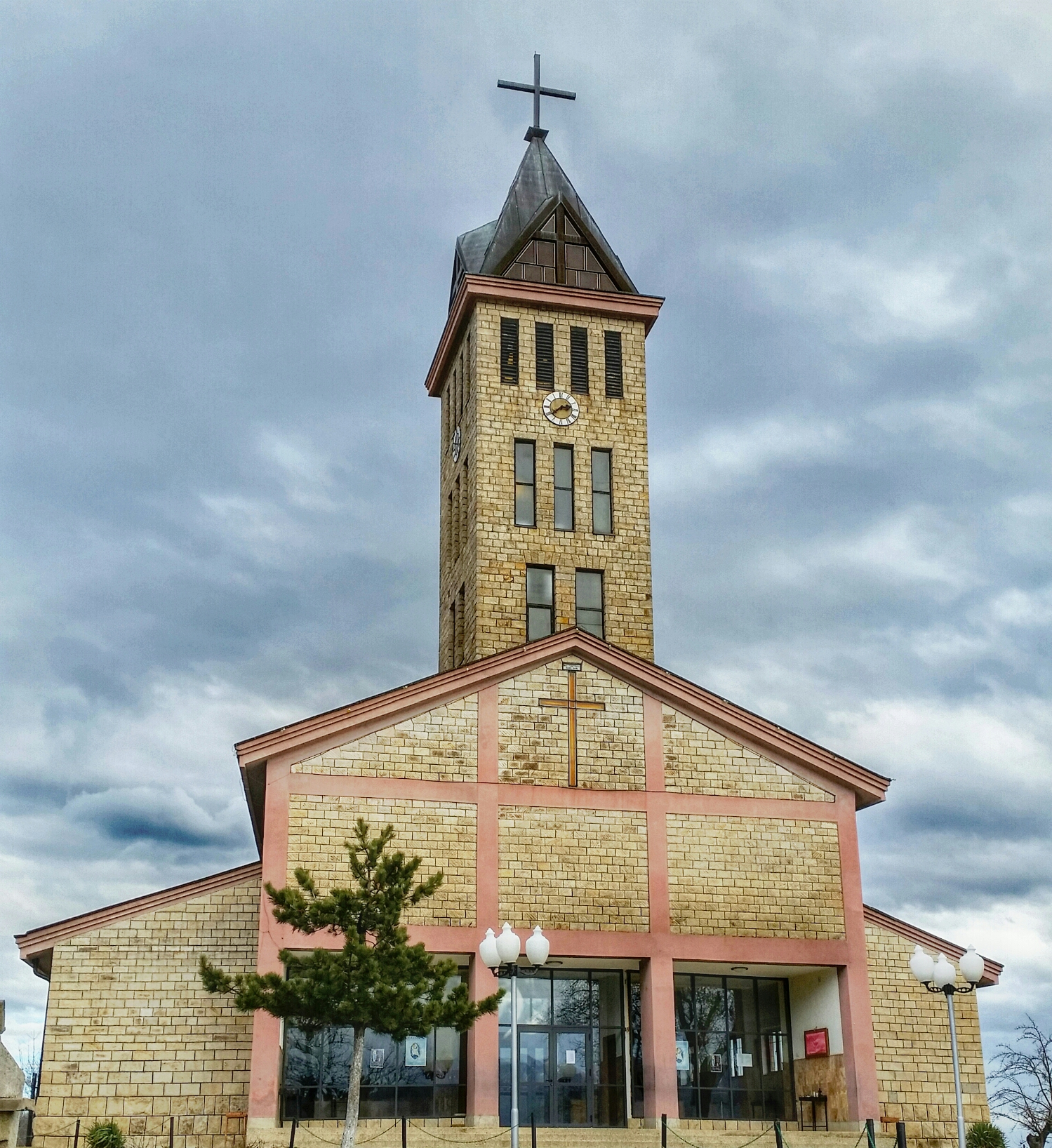
- Interactive map of Saint Joseph's Church
- Location: Stubëll e Epërme, Vitina, Kosovo

History
- Built: 1969

Saint Joseph's Church is a cultural heritage monument in Stubëll e Epërme, Viti, Kosovo.

== History and description ==
Saint Joseph's Church was built of reinforced concrete in 1969 with a façade of well-hewn stone from Stubllavaçë, the same source used for Saint Anthony of Padua’s church in Binač. The façade stones are sloped and tinted gray, and the edifice is topped with a Latin cross inscribed as follows: Martirët tanë 1846–1848 (“Our martyrs 1846–1848”).

The church is triangular, featuring a nave from transept to apse and two side naves with no apse. The apse is pentagonal on the exterior, with two corners facing inward and three facing out. Patterns from older early Christian churches, in which side naves were lower than the main one, are reversed here with the main nave at the lowest level. The naves are divided by square pillars with no arcades, giving the church's ceiling the appearance of a coffin.

The entrance includes an open porch, behind which a small corridor with windows and three doors lead to the chapel. The main entrance is used most often in wedding and communion ceremonies, while the side ones are separated by gender for parishioners, the right for men and the left for women.

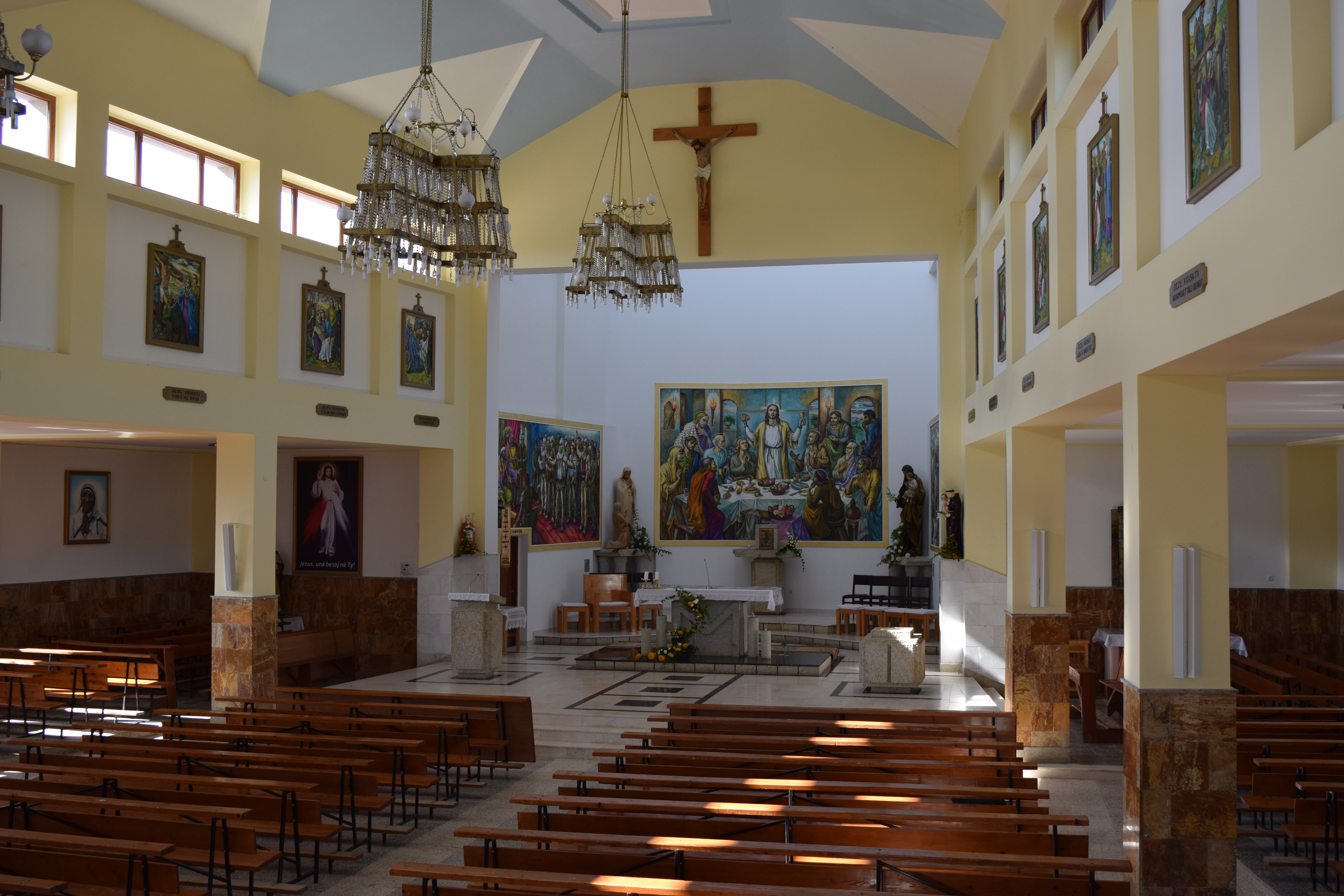
Interior

The three naves where the pews stand each end with one major feature of the church. The main one leads to the chancel, the right to the baptistery, and the left to the pulpit, as in St. Anthony's of Binač. The central altar includes relics and is emblazoned with an engraved "M," which like the cross commemorates the Expulsion of Karadak, an 1846–1848 atrocity in which Catholic Albanians were expelled from four villages by troops of the Ottoman Empire and forced to resettle in Turkey, many dying along the way. Four pilasters symbolize the villages, namely Stublla proper, Binač, Vërnakolla, and Terziaj. An improvised two-part base holds the priest's chair, and others are nearby for deacons and to hold communion wafers. In each of two corners of the altar room lays a slab over four grooved pillars. Above the left slab is a depiction of Our Lady of Lourdes and a worshipper, while above the right slab is a carving of the church's patron Saint Joseph. Two side entrances lead to different rooms, one for the priest and one for attendants, each with entryways to the outside.

The church choir and orchestra sit on the floor opposite the apse. A choir is raised 30 cm above the floor and includes stairs of four different types of wood. Iron stairs lead there from the right entrance of the chapel. The apse walls include notable murals: the front depicts the Last Supper, the right wall Calvary, and the left is used with the right to form a diptych about the Expulsion. 14 framed figures depict the Stations of the Cross. The apse ceiling is engraved with a Latin cross and illuminated by its own windows. Eight windows from all four sides of the naves light up the chapel.

An altarpiece in front of the right nave was taken from Saint Anne's Church in Dunav, Gjilan, which today lacks worshipers. The left nave is fronted by a mural of Jesus. The integrated bell tower has three rows of windows where it rises up. The first row includes two windows on each of the four sides, while the other two rows have each add one more per side. The belfry ends includes several points, the highest of them being the cross. The church lies on a gentle hill with a well-arranged churchyard of trees, greens, and cobblestone walkways.
