= Mogila, Kosovo =

Village in Kllokot, Kosovo

Mogila Могила (Serbian) Mogillë (Albanian)
- Village
- Location within Kosovo
- Coordinates: 42.34108°N 21.39272°E
- Country: Kosovo
- District: Gjilan
- Municipality: Klokot

Population (2024)
  - Total: 988
- Time zone: UTC+1 (CET)
  - Summer (DST): UTC+2 (CEST)

Mogila (Albanian: Mogillë, Serbian: Могила) is a village in the municipality of Klokot, Kosovo.

== Geography ==
The village is located on the foothills of the Karadak Mountains, It borders the village of Gjylekar in the west and Viti in the west.

== Notable people ==
- Njazi Azemi
