= Gjilan (disambiguation) =

Gjilan is a city in east-central Kosovo.

Gjilan may also refer to:

- District of Gjilan, an administrative district surrounding Gjilan
- Gnjilan (Pirot), a village in Serbia
