= Expulsion of Karadak =

Catholic Albanians expelled between 1846 and 1847 in Gjilan

Martiret e Karadakut (The Martyrs of Karadak)
- Location: Gjilan, Kosovo vilayet, Ottoman Empire
- Date: 1846–1847
- Target: Catholic Albanians in Karadak
- Attack type: Ethnic cleansing, Expulsion, Forced migration
- Victims: 150
- Perpetrators: Maliq Beg Gjinolli, Muslim Albanian Highlanders from Karadak
- Motive: Anti-Catholicism

The Expulsion of Karadak was the expulsion of Catholic Albanians between 1846 and 1847 by the Ottoman authorities in the region of Karadak. The Christian Albanians of the Karadak region were crypto-Catholics (Laramans). In 1846, they declared themselves openly to be Catholics. Sopi describes the suffering and the exile of Catholic Albanians in Karadak (modern day Letnicë in Vitina) who in the years of 1845 publicly declared their Christian faith. The Albanian Maliq Beg of Gjilani then ordered for their arrest where 30 members were sent to Skopje and then to Istanbul where they remained in prisons for months. Later they were deported to a swamp region in Anatolia, Turkey, where half of them died. In 1848, survivors returned where they once again were persecuted. Before leaving they made an oath in front of the statue of the Black Madonna in the church of St. George in Viti. The highlanders of Karadak were from Stublla, Binca, Terziaj and Vernakolla. Today there is a monument dedicated to the martyrs in courtyard of the church.

In total, 150 Catholic Albanians and their priest were expelled to Anatolia. 20 of them died during the journey to their place of exile and another 70 died in the harsh conditions of Anatolia before being allowed to return to their homeland in 1848.

Bishop Marko Sopi (1938-2006) wrote the first historical monograph about the events of the expulsion. In 1996, he wrote a book entitled “Martirët e Karadakut” (“Martyrs of Karadak”) about the martyrdom of his compatriots and ancestors - he is a native of this area, from the town of Binač.
