= Dëbëlldeh =

Dëbëlldeh: Dëbëlldeh (Albanian); Дебелде/Debelde (Serbian)
- Village
- Location within Kosovo
- Coordinates: 42.26083°N 21.39833°E
- Country: Kosovo
- District: Gjilan
- Municipality: Vitina

Population (2024)
  - Total: 53
- Time zone: UTC+1 (CET)
  - Summer (DST): UTC+2 (CEST)

Dëbëlldeh (Albanian: Dëbëlldeh, Serbian: Дебелде) is a village in the municipality of Vitia, Kosovo.

== Etymology ==
The name of the village comes from the Slavic words "Debeli Deo" (Serbian: Дебели Део), which translated into English mean "Thick Place".

== Geography ==
The village is located in the Karadak Mountain range, northwest of Kopilaq Mountain. It borders the village of Mjak in the west and Tanuševci in the south which is located in North Macedonia.

== History ==
The inhabitants of the village belong to the same clan originating from the Berisha tribe and are separated into two branches; The Mahalla of Fejzalar with nine families, and the Mahalla of Qorroll with thirteen families. During the 19th century, the ancestors of the village residents expelled all the Serb inhabitants from the village. Two Serbian families from Dëbëlldeh moved to the village of Klokot after their expulsion.

In 1901, the village was known as "Deblidel" and consisted of a population of 117 people, all of whom were Muslims. The Bajraktar of the village was Halil Arifi.

The village alongside Tanuševci became a strongholds of Balli Kombëtar during the Second World War and were the site of the Congress of Kopilaqa of Karadak Leaders such as Mulla Idriz Gjilani, Sulë Hotla, Jusuf Lipovica and others.

During the Interwar period, two Albanian families from Dëbëlldeh moved into the village Beguncë.

During the Kosovo War, most of the village was burned down and property was looted and 4 Civilians in the village were killed by Serb Forces

During the Conflict in Macedonia in 2001, the village became a stronghold of the NLA, from which many attacks on Macedonian forces were conducted. Following an agreement between Serbia and Montenegro and Macedonia the village alongside Mjak were supposed to be given to Macedonia, the idea was given up after local residents from Dëbëlldeh and Mjak rose up to arms and threatened to start a new conflict, the locals were supported by ANA militants and former NLA commanders such as Xhezair Shaqiri
