= Sllatinë e Epërme =

Sllatinë e Epërme: Sllatinë e Epërme (Albanian); Горња Слатина/Gornja Slatina (Serbian)
- Village
- Location within Kosovo
- Coordinates: 42.359949°N 21.295880°E
- Location: Kosovo
- District: Gjilan
- Municipality: Viti
- Elevation: 495 m (1,624 ft)

Population (2024)
  - Total: 1,849
- Time zone: UTC+1 (CET)
  - Summer (DST): UTC+2 (CEST)

Sllatinë e Epërme (Albanian: Sllatinë e Epërme, Serbian Cyrillic: Горња Слатина/Gornja Slatina) is a village in Viti municipality, Kosovo.
