= Binac =

Binac may refer to:

- Binač, a village in Kosovo
- BINAC, a 1949 computer
