= Donja Budriga =

Donja Budriga: Budrikë e Poshtme (Albanian) Долна Будрига (Macedonian) Donja Budriga or Доња Будрига (Serbian)
- Village
- Location in Kosovo
- Coordinates: 42°24′35″N 21°27′18″E
- Country: Kosovo
- District: Gjilan
- Municipality: Partesh

Population (2024)
  - Total: 838
- Time zone: UTC+1 (CET)
  - Summer (DST): UTC+2 (CEST)

Donja Budriga (Serbian Cyrillic: Доња Будрига, Albanian: Budrikë e Poshtme, Macedonian: Долна Будрига, romanized: Dolna Budriga) is a village in the municipality of Parteš in Kosovo. It is inhabited by a majority of ethnic Serbs.
