= Zejnullahu =

Zejnullahu is an Albanian surname. Notable people with the surname include:

- Eroll Zejnullahu (born 1994), Kosovo Albanian footballer
- Hakif Zejnullahu (1962–1997), Kosovan commander
- Jonuz Zejnullahu (1975–1999), Albanian Imam and soldier
- Jusuf Zejnullahu (born 1944), Kosovar politician
