= Remnik =

Remnik: Remnik (Albanian); Рибник/Ribnik (Serbian)
- Village
- Location within Kosovo
- Coordinates: 42°21′34″N 21°26′29″E
- Location: Kosovo
- District: Gjilan
- Municipality: Viti
- Elevation: 595 m (1,952 ft)

Population (2024)
  - Total: 990
- Time zone: UTC+1 (CET)
  - Summer (DST): UTC+2 (CEST)

Remnik (Albanian: Remnik, Serbian Cyrillic: Рибник/Ribnik) is a village in Viti municipality, Kosovo.

== History ==
The village is situated in the foothills Karadak mountains. During the Ottoman era, Remnik was part of the Karadak nahiye in the Kaza of Gjilan, within the Sanjak of Prishtina in the Vilayet of Kosovo. During that time, the oldest ibtidaiye maktab in the Kaza of Gjilan was established in Remnik in 1881/1882. During World War II in Karadak, Remnik was occupied by the Tsardom of Bulgaria. From 12 to 15 March 1942, Serbian Chetniks, in collaboration with the occupying Bulgarian army, besieged the village of Remnik and perpetrated violence against the local Albanian population. Under the guise of searching for weapons, they detained the men of Remnik in the village mosque for three days, resulting in the torture and execution of 24 individuals. After the massacre, Hasan Ali Remniku and his men managed to break the siege and relocate the villagers to the Italian-controlled zone. They organized resistance against the Serbian and Bulgarian occupiers and sought revenge against those involved in the massacre. Reports indicate that Hasan Ali Remniku killed over 15 Bulgarian and Serbian soldiers, including some who took part in the massacre at the mosque.
