= Gornja Slatina Mosque =

Cultural heritage monument of Kosovo

- Xhamia e Sllatinës së Epërme (Albanian)
- Interactive map of Gornja Slatina Mosque
- 42°21′46″N 21°17′56″E
- Location: Gornja Slatina, Vitina, Kosovo

History
- Built: 1905–1907

The Gornja Slatina Mosque is a cultural heritage monument in Gornja Slatina, Vitina, Kosovo.

== Description ==
Although dedicated in 1924, the plaque on the front door attributes the mosque to a construction date between 1905 and 1907. A local nobleman named Emin Aga spearheaded construction, hiring 12 craftsmen from the Sanjak of Dibra, including mason Halit Ymeri. The building is stone with lime mortar.
