= Livoç i Ulët =

Livoç i Ulët: Livoç i Ulët (Albanian); Доњи Ливоч/Donji Livoč (Serbian)
- Village
- Location within Kosovo
- Coordinates: 42.430706°N 21.453921°E
- Location: Kosovo
- District: Gjilan
- Municipality: Gjilan

Population (2024)
  - Total: 3,293
- Time zone: UTC+1 (Central European Time)
  - Summer (DST): UTC+2 (CEST)

Livoç i Ulët is a village in the District of Gjilan, Kosovo. It is located south of Gjilan.
