= Letnica, Viti =

Letnica Letnicë (Albanian) Летница/Letnica (Serbian)
- Village
- Interactive map of Letnica
- Coordinates: 42.292213°N 21.452133°E
- Country: Kosovo
- District: Gjilan
- Municipality: Vitia

Population (2024)
  - Total: 168
- Time zone: UTC+1 (CET)
  - Summer (DST): UTC+2 (CEST)

Letnica

Letnica (Albanian: Letnicë, Serbian: Летница) is a village in the municipality of Vitina, Kosovo.

== Geography ==
The village is located in the Karadak Mountain range.
