= Livoç i Epërm =

Livoç i Epërm: Livoç i Epërm (Albanian); Горњи Ливоч/Gornji Livoč (Serbian)
- Village
- Location within Kosovo
- Coordinates: 42.453924°N 21.431558°E
- Location: Kosovo
- District: Gjilan
- Municipality: Gjilan

Population (2024)
  - Total: 2,705
- Time zone: UTC+1 (Central European Time)
  - Summer (DST): UTC+2 (CEST)

Livoç i Epërm is a village in the District of Gjilan, Kosovo. It is located west of Gjilan.
