= Stublla e Epërme =

Stublla e Epërme: Stublla e Epërme (Albanian); Горња Стубла/Gornja Stubla (Serbian)
- Village
- Interactive map of Stublla e Epërme
- Location within Kosovo
- Coordinates: 42°19′21″N 21°27′32″E
- Country: Kosovo
- District: Gjilan
- Municipality: Vitia

Population (2011)
  - Total: 1,128
- Time zone: UTC+1 (Central European Time)
  - Summer (DST): UTC+2 (CEST)

Stublla e Epërme is a village in Viti municipality, Kosovo. It is located in the Karadak mountains.

== History ==
Stublla e Epërme has been home to Catholics for centuries. In 1584 there was an Albanian school functioning in the village.

== Demographics ==
As of 2011 there are 1,128 inhabitants living in the village, all of whom are Albanian.
