= Gërmova =

Grmovo
- Village
- Location within Kosovo
- Coordinates: 42°19′12″N 21°15′55″E
- Country: Kosovo
- District: Gjilan
- Municipality: Viti

Population (2024)
  - Total: 665

Gërmova (Serbian: Grmovo) is a village in Viti Municipality, Kosovo.

== Etymology ==
The name is derived from Serbian, likely originating from the word grm, which in various South Slavic languages denotes a bush, shrub, or thicket, suggesting that the settlement may have been named after the area’s dense vegetation. The suffix -ovo is a typical Slavic toponymic ending used to denote a place associated with a particular natural feature or characteristic.

== History ==
The Gërmova mosque was founded in 1447 according to its foundation stone, making it one of the oldest in Kosovo.

During the Yugoslav colonization of Kosovo, labeled "agrarian reform," 50 Serb families settled in Grmovo/Gërmova.

During the Kosovo Operation (1944), Gërmova and Vitina were occupied by the Bulgarian army.

After World War II, Gërmova was taken back by the Yugoslav government, which continued to hold it as Serbia and Montenegro and later Serbia until 17 February 2008, de facto and beyond de jure, given the 2008 Kosovo declaration of independence.

== Geography ==
The village is near Sadovinë e Jerlivë, Gushica, Smirë, Lower Slatina, and Drobesh.

== Demography ==
Population changes
Year	Population
1948	522
1953	587
1961	551
1971	636
1981	745
1991	941
2011	886
2024	665

A minority of the town’s population emigrated in the 20th and 21st centuries, some to other countries in Europe (such as Switzerland and Germany), others outside the continent.

== Notable people ==
- Liridon Krasniqi, Kosovar-born, Malay football player.
- Vukašin Jokanović, Yugoslav ministry of the Interior.
