= Saint Anne's Church, Dunav =

Cultural heritage monument of Kosovo

Coordinates: 42°16′22″N 21°33′32″E

St. Anne’s Church in Dunav
- Kisha e Shën Anës në Dunav (Albanian)
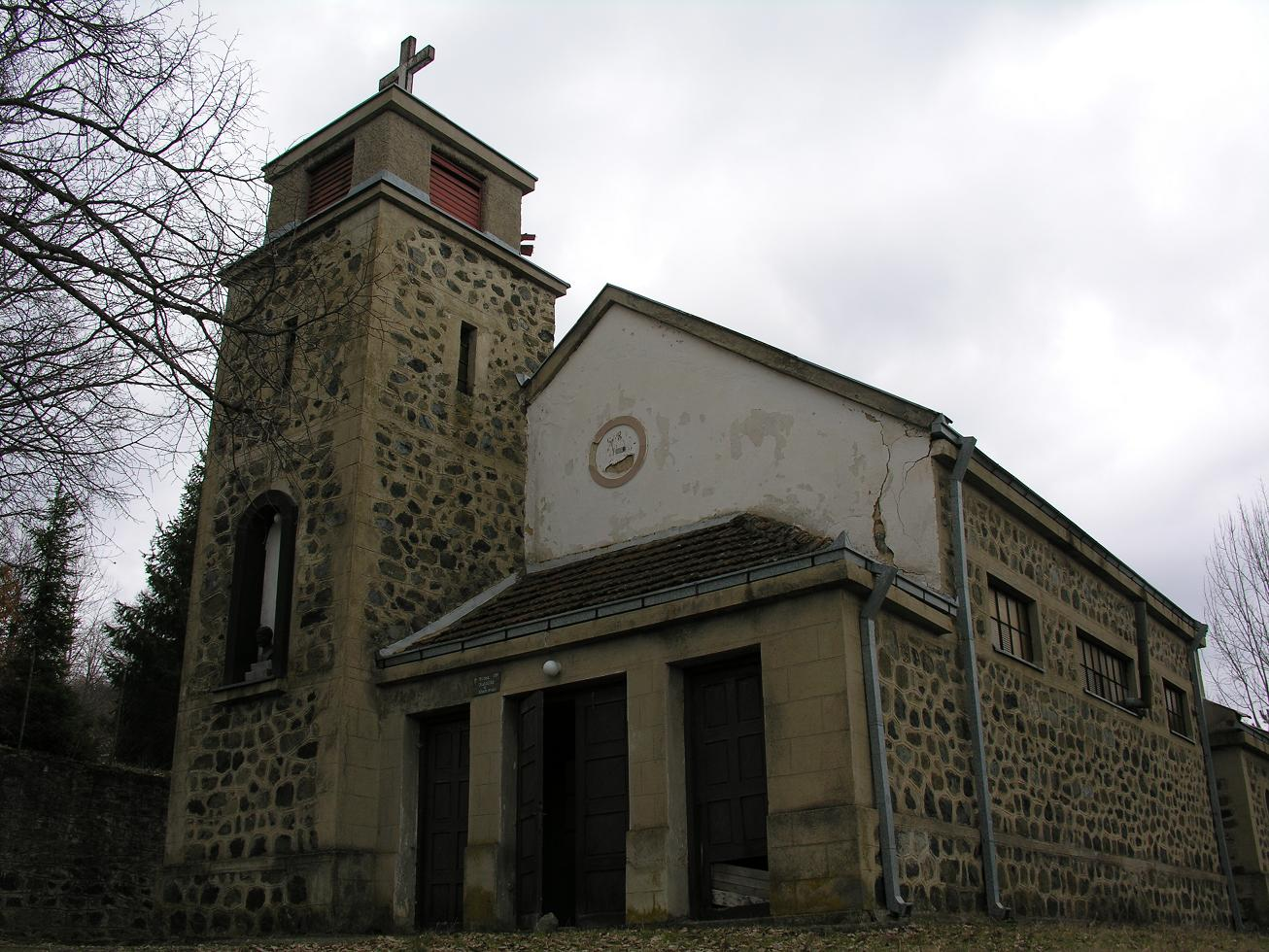
- Interactive map of St. Anne’s Church in Dunav
- Location: Dunav, Gjilan, Kosovo

History
- Built: 1938

Cultural Heritage under Permanent Protection
- Type: Architectural Heritage: Monument/Ensemble
- Criteria: Under Protection
- Part of: 200/2023
- Reference no.: 180

St. Anne's Church in Dunav is a cultural heritage monument in Dunav, Gjilan, Kosovo. Built in 1938, the same year as the village mosque, the church is the only Catholic church in Gjilan, near the point where Kosovo, Serbia, and North Macedonia meet.

== Description ==
The foundation is stone, while the walls are made from bricks bound with lime mortar. The façade wall is built from multicolored tuff mortared with jointed concrete. Left of the entrance, the square bell tower is 12 metres (39 ft) high; its façade includes a niche at the front door's height and four narrow windows for illumination, while the tower's narrowest section tapers to a cross up top. Above the doorway, a simple plaque reads "Kisha Katolike e Shën Anës, 1938" ("St. Anne’s Catholic Church, 1938"). Two doors beside the front one were closed before the last renovation in 2012, one leading to the bell tower and the other to the confessional. A narrow hall leads directly into the nave, with the chapel accessible from three parallel entrances and containing pews on either side of the central aisle. The chapel is domed and has three stained glass windows on the side wall, ending in a transept with two side alcoves and a circular apse with its own outer circular window. The only relic of the original chancel by that apse is the altar table, and the eastern apse connects with the church annexes. The roof, upgraded with gutters in 2012, is dual, with a lower surface above the transept and a higher one above the apse. A statue of Our Lady of Good Friday was removed from this church and moved to the church of Saint Anthony of Padua in Binač.

The church in is a prime location, with a churchyard reaching down toward in a terrace wall at the bottom of a hill. The yard is surrounded by poplars, some pines, and some lime trees. Though summers are quite hot at 840 metres (2,760 ft) of altitude, a light north–south breeze cools. Although the church is not as popular as it once was as a place of worship, the church grounds have played host since 2011 to the Gjilan-based Beqir Musliu Arts Club's regional poetry festival known as the Trekëndëshi Poetik ("Poetic Triangle").
