= Nijazi Azemi =

Albanian soldier of the Kosovo Liberation Army (1970–2001)

- Born: 16 June 1970; Mogila, SAP Kosovo, SR Serbia SFR Yugoslavia (today Kosovo)
- Died: 26 March 2001 (aged 30); Stanevce, Preševo, FR Yugoslavia
- Military career
- Allegiance: Bosnia and Herzegovina; Kosova; Liberation Army of Preševo, Medveđa and Bujanovac
- Branch: Bosnian Army; Kosovo Liberation Army; Liberation Army of Preševo, Medveđa and Bujanovac
- Service years: 1998–2001
- Rank: Commander
- Nicknames: "Komandant Mjekrra" "Flakadani i Karadakut"
- Unit: 115th "Karadaku" Brigade
- Conflicts: Kosovo war: Battle of Kosharë; Insurgency in the Preševo Valley: Battle of Shoshajë
- Awards: Hero of Kosovo

Nijazi Azemi (16 June 1970 – 26 March 2001) was one of the early and high-ranking commanders of the Liberation Army of Preševo, Medveđa and Bujanovac (UÇPMB). During the war, he had the nickname "Komandant Mjekrra" ("Commander Beard"). He was known for his Guerilla-style attacks on Yugoslav Army (VJ) and police. He was the main commander of the 115th "Karadaku" Brigade, which was later renamed to 115th "Nijazi Azemi" Brigade following his death.

== Biography ==
Azemi was born on 16 June 1970 in Mogila. Later he began to deal with special constructions with wood carving, quickly shaping the profession, and later started making wood art in his free time.

Azemi had taken part in various demonstrations organized by Kosovo Albanians in western cities. On 29 March 1989, while protesting the Serbian government in Kosovo, Azemi was injured after a clash with Serbian police. After the help of the Migjeni association, Azemi began training with the Kosovo Liberation Army (KLA).

Serbian police raided Azemi's house in speculation of finding weapons These actions had often forced Azemi to lead an illegal life. In order to avoid being arrested by the Serbian Police, he crossed the border of Kosovo and took refuge with his soldiers in Debar, Macedonia, as well as other places in Albania several times.

=== Kosovo War ===
Azemi started to train in the KLA at the beginning of the Kosovo War. Azemi quickly rose up the ranks in the KLA. In the summer of 1998, he became part of these insurgencies, as a member of the 134th "Bedri Shala" Brigade, which operated in the Dukagjini Operational Zone. Azemi took part in the Battle of Košare on the border between the Federal Republic of Yugoslavia and Albania. He had returned to his home on 28 June 1999 after the signing of the Kumanovo Agreement which ended the Kosovo War.

=== Insurgency in the Preševo Valley ===
Following the end of the Kosovo War, Shefket Musliu, Muhamet Xhemajli, Ridvan Qazimi and Mustafa Shaqiri founded and commanded the UÇPMB which began training in the Ground Safety Zone (GSZ), an area that previously VJ units were prohibited from entering after the Kumanovo Agreement. The group began attacking Serbian civilians and police, with the goal of joining Preševo, Medveđa and Bujanovac into Kosovo, which escalated into an insurgency.

Azemi later joined the UÇPMB, where he was known as "Komandant Mjekrra." He was the commander of the 115th "Karadaku" brigade of the UÇPMB, which was renamed the 115th "Nijazi Azemi" brigade after his death. Azemi fought until an agreement by NATO which allowed the VJ to enter the GSZ via Operation Return. Despite the ceasefire, he had openly stated that he would not hand over his weapons and that it was not clear to him what his superiors had signed, as he stated: "I did not seize the weapons to hand them over."

== Death ==
On 26 March 2001, Azemi and other UÇPMB fighters were situated near the village of Caravajkë in the municipality of Presevo. VJ soldiers were also stationed in this village, which led to a shootout erupting. Azemi was hit by a sniper bullet, even though he was wearing a bulletproof vest. He was struck on the left side of his chest. Despite first-aid intervention, Azemi died from his wounds.

On 28 March 2001, the body of Azemi was exhibited in the Adem Jashari square in Viti in front of thousands. He was buried later that day at the Martyrs' Cemetery in Vitina. A square in the city of Viti bears the name of Nijazi Azemi.
