= Battle of Tetovo =

Battle of the 2001 insurgency in Macedonia

Coordinates: 42°0′N 20°58′E

- Part of the 2001 insurgency in Macedonia
Date	16 March–13 August 2001 (4 months and 4 weeks)
Location	Tetovo, Macedonia
Result	See aftermath

Belligerents
Macedonia	National Liberation Army; Albanian National Army	NATO: United States; United Kingdom; France; Germany; Italy; and 22 countries included

Commanders and leaders
(North Macedonia) Boris Trajkovski (North Macedonia) Pande Petrovski (North Macedonia) Ljube Boškoski	Gëzim Ostreni; Rahim Beqiri †; Hamdi Nëdrecaj; Samidin Xhezairi; Skerdilajd Llagami †	(NATO) (United Kingdom) George Robertson (NATO) (Italy) Guido Venturoni

Units involved
Macedonian Army; Special Operations Regiment; “Wolves” Battalion; Military Reserve Force; Armored–Mechanized Units; Artillery Units; Macedonian Air Force; 2 Ukrainian mercenary pilots; Ministry of Interior; Macedonian Police; Special Police Unit "Tigers"; Special Support Unit; Special Police Unit "Lions"	National Liberation Army; Special Operations Brigade "Shpendi"; 112th Brigade "Mujdin Aliu"	(NATO) (Germany) 2 armored companies (NATO) (Germany) 1 logistic unit

Strength
(North Macedonia) 20-30 tanks (North Macedonia) 2 Mi-24 helicopters (operated by Ukrainian mercenary pilots)	2,500–3,000	(NATO) 4,800+ (NATO) 2+ tanks

Casualties and losses
(North Macedonia) Unknown Killed (North Macedonia) 5 Wounded (North Macedonia) 1 armoured vehicle destroyed	7 militants killed 7 wounded	(NATO) (Germany) 1 wounded
- 25+ civilians killed 20+ civilians kidnapped

The Battle of Tetovo (Macedonian: Битка за Тетово, romanized: Bitka za Tetovo, Albanian: Beteja e Tetovës), that lasted from March to August 2001, was the largest engagement during the 2001 insurgency in Macedonia, in which Macedonian security forces battled the National Liberation Army (NLA) for control of the city.

== Prelude ==
Tetovo is the fifth largest city in North Macedonia (previously Macedonia), the majority of whose citizens are ethnic Albanians. Tetovo, along with the city of Gostivar, took in and sheltered several thousands of Bosnian Muslim refugees from 1992 until the end of the Bosnian war.

Before 1991 Kosovo and Macedonia formed part of Yugoslavia which meant unrestricted access between the entities.

In 1997, Alajdin Demiri, the mayor of Tetovo, was jailed for raising the double headed eagle flag of Albania from Tetovo town hall and by 2000 the outbreak of hostilities in Tanuševci had spilled into the towns of Tetovo and Gostivar. With the formation of an insurgency, the National Liberation Front (NLA) began seizing territory in and around the Tetovo area. Skirmishes between the insurgency and government forces became commonplace in other portions of the country.

The Macedonian forces, numbering more than 3,000, held a limited amount of Armour and artillery. Reportedly, they possessed a number of armoured personnel carriers, 105 mm and 122 mm Howitzers, and ex-Bulgarian T-55 tanks. The bulk of their force consisted of reservists at the brink of conflict. These numbers were to rapidly rise in the following months as the military expenditures of Macedonia quadrupled to almost 7% of GDP, which resulted in major purchases of military hardware mainly from Ukraine and Bulgaria, and the mobilization of special police forces like the Lions and Tigers. By the height of the conflict, the whole 1st Mechanized Brigade was stationed in and around Tetovo municipality.

The NLA, a mainly guerrilla force, had only an assortment of rockets, assault weapons, and mortars. However, they had the advantage of concealed positions in the mountains ringing the city. Weapons and supplies found their way from Kosovo to the frontlines over the Šar Mountains through horse caravans. Mounts Baltepe and Kale were major strongpoints, both of which held ancient fortresses left over from the Ottoman Empire. The rebels constructed a series of trenches and bunkers in defence.

== Battle ==
=== Opening phase ===
During the afternoon of 14 March, ethnic Albanians held a nationalist rally in town. Around this time, machine gun fire opened up on Macedonian police from the Baltepes hill. The NLA proceeded to engage Macedonian forces with sniper fire and mortar attacks.

The first civilian death was an Albanian taxi driver.

Fifteen Macedonian police and a NATO German soldier were also wounded when joint barracks in the outskirts of the town where hit by mortar fire. The next day, the German Ministry of Defence moved in two heavy Leopard 2 main battle tanks from Prizren, in Kosovo, in order to protect the base. Half of the 1,200 German troops were evacuated to another location eight kilometers away. By 20 March, another 400 KFOR German combat troops equipped with Marder infantry fighting vehicles and more Leopard 2 tanks had been deployed to Tetovo. Civilians continued on with their daily business, but the streets became empty. Cafes and shops were deserted and electricity was cut off to part of the town. For the cafes that remained open, it was common to see some people taking the risk of watching gun battles.

On 21 March, the two sides witnessed a brief cease fire. The day was quiet without a single shot. By this point in time, however, thousands of residents had fled the city. Those whom remained pressed on with life as best as they could while both factions recuperated. It was also on this day that the Macedonian army scaled Kale Hill under cover of artillery and gunfire.

On 22 March, after two months of sporadic violence, two Albanians were gunned down near the football stadium in the eastern districts. The two men approached a Macedonian checkpoint in a white car and tossed a device to the policemen. The men were shot immediately. Albanian media reported that Macedonian forces mistook a cellphone for an explosive device, though it was later established that it was, indeed, a hand grenade. Footage of the dead men made world headlines for its graphic content.

The Macedonians proceeded to build up their security forces and deployed T-55 tanks in support.

In Tetovo's old town, a sandbag checkpoint near the Church of St. Nicholas suffered frequent shelling from houses in the highlands. Over the next few days, several skirmishes broke out throughout the hills. A Macedonian Mi-17 helicopter crashed while ferrying police forces to a ski resort on the outskirts of town, killing the pilot and wounding 16 policemen. Most of the rebels held out on Baltepe Mountain. From the Koltak district, Macedonian forces poured fire onto Albanian positions. This was often returned with machine gun, sniper, and mortar fire.

The NLA stood their ground.

=== Operation MH ===
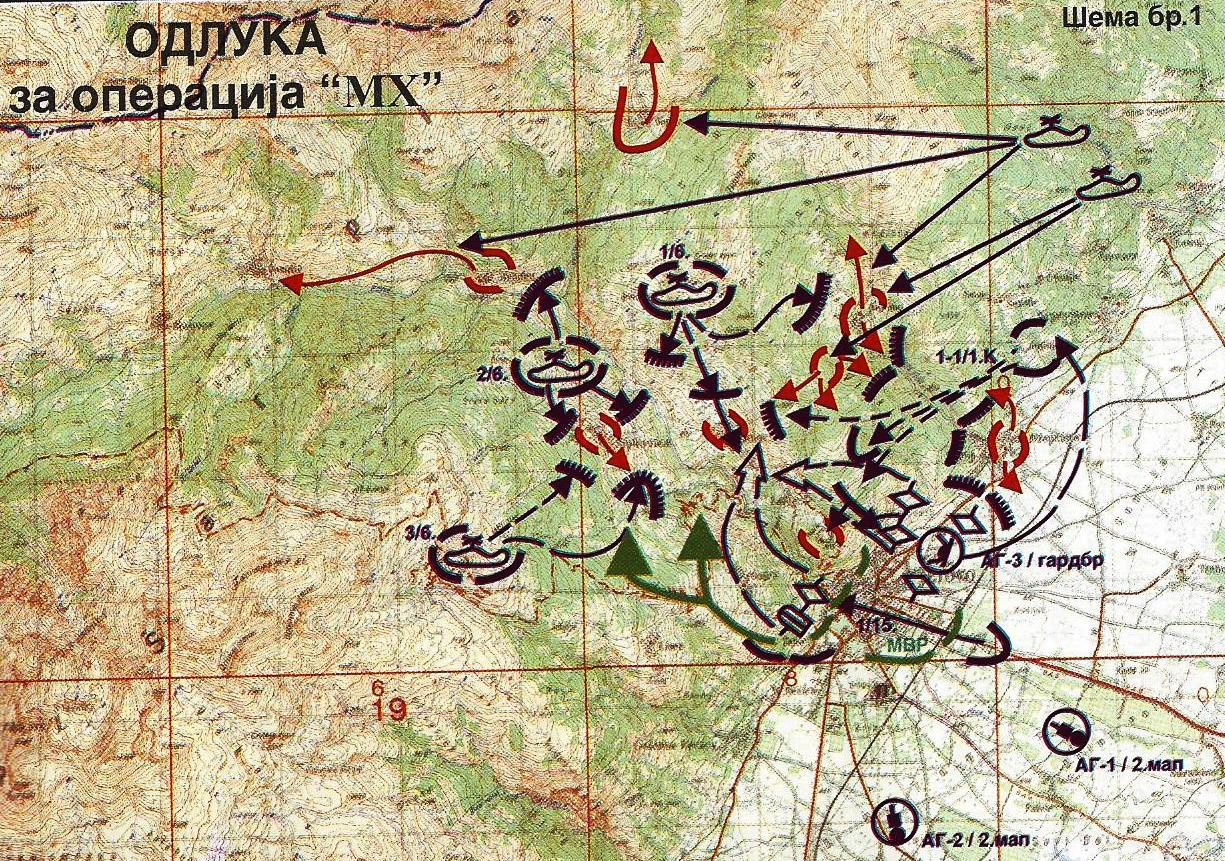
Plan for Operation MH in the Tetevo area in 2001

Operation MH was the first Macedonian offensive planned and executed to clear out the rebels after weeks of skirmishes with the NLA. It began on March 25 with a combined assault by Macedonian Army and Police forces in the city of Tetovo and the surrounding villages which resulted with the routing of NLA forces and their removal from the Tetovo area, the NLA called it a tactical retreat. The offensive ended two days later with the Macedonian security forces taking control of the city, the fortified medieval fortress and the surrounding villages.

=== Second phase ===
On 6 June another cease-fire was initiated, which lasted eighteen days before being broken by the NLA. Just before noon on 22 July, machine gun and small arms fire shattered the silence once again. As United States and European envoys met with President Boris Trajkovski in Skopje on 23 July, the battle reached Tetovo's suburbs.

On 23 July, the Macedonians used ex-Ukrainian Mi-24 helicopters for the first time in the conflict, responding to Albanian mortar fire that wounded 20 civilians in the Koltuk area.

On 24 July the Macedonian government issued an ultimatum demanding the NLA retreat from their positions in Tetovo and the villages which they took during the ceasefire or face an all out attack. The rebel's abuse of the NATO brokered ceasefire to gain territory and the international observers criticizing of the Macedonian government for using disproportionate force against the rebels prompted the Macedonian government to accuse NATO of siding with the rebels.

The NLA would continue to abuse ceasefires to gain ground in the north of Tetovo as Harald Schenker in a report for OSCE would state:

"The OSCE was in danger of becoming the object of the tensions within the crisis government, particularly as it had no mandate, let alone the power to prevent or even stop the territorial gains that the UCK/ NLA had made in the area north of Tetovo in clear violation of the ceasefire."

In the Drenovac district, rebels and government forces fought heavily for the town's sports stadium. The fall of the stadium and government checkpoint left the rebels within fifty yards of the city center. Residents of the areas were instructed to leave their homes by Macedonian forces.

Thirteen civilians and five government soldiers were injured. Macedonian government forces also shelled villages surrounding Tetovo, which were under control of Albanian rebels.

On July 25 things in the city calmed down as the rebels were fortifying their positions On July 26 the NLA agreed to pull back to their original positions before the ceasefire amid Macedonian government threats that refusal would lead to a full scale offensive.

On July 30 the Macedonian government accused the rebels of violating the new ceasefire by staying at the positions they captured during the past week which the NLA denied but was confirmed by international observers who spotted the Rebels in uniform and civilian clothing. This prevented the return of the Macedonian refugees that had left the villages during the fighting. International observers also witnessed ethnic Macedonian homes being set alight by the NLA in the village of Tearce.

=== Final phase ===
The Ohrid Framework Agreement negotiations finally came into play on 8 August. By then, Tetovo was practically a ghost city, most of its residents having fled the fighting.

The next day, the rebels attacked Macedonian army barracks in central Tetovo, sending black plumes of smoke above the northern and southwestern suburbs. Part of the barracks and an armored personnel carrier were set on fire in the fighting. The Macedonian National Security Council, in response, authorized another offensive against the NLA. Macedonian forces concentrated their attack around the suburb of Teqe, of which a graveyard separated both factions.

== Aftermath ==
On 13 August, Macedonian and Albanian representatives signed the Ohrid Agreement, ending most of the fighting. Over the next few months, NATO and Macedonian troops worked to disarm the NLA, which ceded power after the thirty-day Operation Essential Harvest.

As a result of the fighting, the Red Cross estimated that 76,000 people fled their homes. Though the major violence ended on the 13th, skirmishes and harassment remained common throughout the Tetovo area.

On 12 November, three Macedonian police officers were ambushed and killed in the village of Treboš.

== See also ==
- Operation Essential Harvest
- Operation MH-2
- Operation Vaksince
- Vejce ambush
- Karpalak ambush
- Prizren incident (1999)
- Tearce attack

== Bibliography ==
- Diary of an Uncivil War, by Scott Taylor, Esprit de Corps Books (22 February 2002).
- Macedonia: Warlords and Rebels in the Balkans, by John Phillips, I.B. Tauris & Co Ltd, 2004.
