= Skerdilajd Llagami =

National Liberation Army (Macedonia) commander

- Born: 31 October 1969; Tirana, Albania
- Died: 29 June 2001 (aged 31) near Bogovinë, Tetovë, North Macedonia
- Military career
- Allegiance: Albania; Kosovo Liberation Army; Liberation Army of Preševo, Medveđa and Bujanovac; National Liberation Army
- Branch: (Albania) Special Operations Unit; Dukagjin Operational Zone; Special Operations Brigade; 112th Brigade "Mujdin Aliu"
- Service years: 1997–2001
- Rank: Commander
- Nickname: "Komandant Shpendi"
- Conflicts: 1997 Albanian civil unrest Kosovo War; Insurgency in the Preshevo Valley 2001 insurgency in Macedonia: Battle of Tetovë

Skerdilajd Llagami (31 October 1969 – 29 June 2001), also known as Komandant Shpendi, was an Albanian military commander who participated in several armed conflicts in the late 1990s and early 2000s. Initially serving in Albania's special forces, he later became part of the Albanian rebel-groups during the Kosovo War, Insurgency in the Preševo Valley and Albanian Uprising in Macedonia. Llagami was killed in action, during the final stages of the 2001 insurgency in Macedonia.

== Early life ==
Skerdilajd Llagami was born on 31 October 1969, in Tirana, Albania, as the eldest son of Bardhyl Llagami. His family was well known in Tirana, with many members being professionals in law and linguistics. As a student at the "Myslim Keta" high school, Llagami was noted for his athletic physique, particularly in bodybuilding and track and field. Despite his promising sports career, he was required to take up work at the "Stalin" Textile Factory in the Kombinat neighborhood, where his father was later appointed chief engineer.

== Military career ==
=== Albanian Unrest 1997 ===
Despite his work obligations, he remained committed to physical training. His strong physique and discipline led to his recruitment into the Albanian Ministry of Internal Affairs Special Forces unit known as “Brisku” in 1997. In this role, Llagami participated in numerous special operations, aimed at restoring order and developed military skills in urban warfare and special operations.

=== Kosovo War ===
In March 1999, Llagami left his position in the Albanian Special Forces and joined the ranks of the Kosovo Liberation Army without informing his family or superiors. He quickly distinguished himself in combat, particularly in the Dukagjin Operational Zone of the KLA. He was later promoted to the rank of Battalion Commander of a local KLA-Unit, after participating in several successful operations against Serbian forces. Llagami became well known for leading raids and defensive operations against Serbian forces in the Dukagjin Operational Zone of the KLA.

His family remained unaware of his whereabouts for several months until they discovered Llagamis involvement in the war through a newspaper interview with another KLA fighter from Albania.

=== Insurgency in the Preshevo Valley ===
After the war ended in June 1999, Llagami did not return to Albania, choosing instead to join the UÇPMB, which engaged in an armed insurgency against Serbian forces in the Albanian-majority Preševo Valley. He continued to command units on the front lines, taking part in various operations until the insurgency ended.

=== Albanian Uprising in Macedonia ===
In early 2001, tensions escalated between the Albanian population and the Macedonian-led government. After the formation of the National Liberation Army, an armed struggle between the two ethnic groups began.

Llagami crossed into Northern Macedonia and joined the NLA's 112th Brigade, “Mujdin Aliu,” one of the most active units in the conflict. His extensive combat experience and tactical skills from earlier wars quickly set him apart and led to his promotion as Commander of the Special Unit of the 112th "Mujdin Aliu" Brigade of the NLA, operating in the Sharri Mountains near Tetovo. His special unit, composed of highly trained and battle-experienced fighters, specialized in offensive operations against Macedonian forces.

He played an important role in several key battles in the Operational Zone of Sharri of the NLA, including the Battle of Tetovo, where the NLA launched a major offensive against Macedonian forces in and around the city, capturing large parts of the majority-Albanian Tetovë Municipality. Llagami was instrumental in organizing ambushes, securing supply lines and training new recruits in guerrilla warfare tactics during the conflict.

His leadership helped the NLA gain control of strategic areas in western Macedonia, further increasing his reputation within the military organization. Recognizing his capabilities, the NLA General Staff tasked Llagami and his unit, with leading special missions in high-risk zones.

== Death ==
On 29 June 2001, Llagami was killed in action near the village of Bogovinje, Tetovo, during fierce clashes with Macedonian police and military forces, who had launched an operation to reclaim territory held by the NLA. The news of his death reached his family weeks later. Following his passing, the special unit of the NLA he had commanded, was named 'Shpendi' in honor of his wartime alias. Llagamis remains were first buried near the Mosque in Bogovinje with military honors by his fellow fighters.

== Legacy ==
Skerdilajd Llagami is remembered as an important freedom fighter who participated in three Albanian armed struggles in Kosovo, the Preshevo Valley and North Macedonia during the civil wars in the former Yugoslavia and is still honored by veterans of the KLA and NLA, who regard him as a symbol of sacrifice and commitment to the Albanian cause.

On the 17th anniversary of his death, Albin Kurti, now the Prime Minister of Kosovo called him a "martyr of the equality of the Albanian nation," praising his sacrifice for national unity beyond state-imposed borders. In 2020, Lulzim Basha the former Mayor of Tirana and leader of the Democratic Party of Albania at the time, paid tribute to Llagami, when he visited his father and underlined the importance of remembering those who participated in conflicts beyond Albania's borders.

In 2013, thanks to efforts by the "Tirana" Association and its chairman, Arben Tafaj, Llagami's remains were repatriated to Albania. A formal ceremony was held at the Central House of the Army in Tirana, attended by political figures, family members and wartime comrades. Llagami was laid to rest in National Martyrs' Cemetery of Albania in Tirana with full military honors. His name continues to be commemorated and a street in Tirana has been named after him.
