= Beguncë =

Beguncë: Beguncë (Albanian); Бегунце/Begunce (Serbian)
- Village
- Location within Kosovo
- Coordinates: 42.301398°N 21.388465°E
- Location: Kosovo
- District: Gjilan
- Municipality: Viti
- Elevation: 665 m (2,182 ft)

Population (2024)
  - Total: 1,528
- Time zone: UTC+1 (CET)
  - Summer (DST): UTC+2 (CEST)

Beguncë (Albanian: Beguncë, Serbian Cyrillic: Бегунце/Begunce) is a village in Viti municipality, Kosovo.
