= Jonuz Zejnullahu =

Albanian soldier of the Kosovo Liberation Army (1975–1999)

- Born: 12 May 1975; Gjylekar, Viti, SFR Yugoslavia, (present-day Kosovo)
- Died: 5 May 1999 (aged 23); Koshare, Gjakovë, FR Yugoslavia (today Kosovo)
- Military career
- Allegiance: Kosova
- Branch: Kosovo Liberation Army
- Rank: Soldier
- Unit: 138 Brigade "Agim Ramadani"
- Known for: Being an Islamic Imam; Blowing himself up, killing himself and 5 Yugoslav Soldiers during the Battle of Koshare
- Conflicts: Kosovo war: Battle of Koshare †

Jonuz Zejnullahu (12 May 1975 – 5 May 1999) was an Albanian Imam and soldier of the Kosovo Liberation Army (KLA), best known for blowing himself up, killing himself and 5 Yugoslav Soldiers during the Battle of Koshare. During the Kosovo War, he was part of Brigade 138 "Agim Ramadani".

== Life ==
Jonuz Zejnullahu was born on May 12, 1975, in the village of Gjylekar, which today is called Skifteraj, in Vitia district. He completed his initial studies in his hometown, while he completed his secondary studies at the "Alaudin" madrasa in Pristina, where he graduated in 1995. He continued his higher studies at the Faculty of Law (Sharia) in Damascus, Syria.

Since he was a student in the madrasa, Jonuz Zejnullahu served as an imam during the month of Ramadan in Vuthaj, Montenegro, and after graduation he served in different mosques, such as in the mosques of Dobresh, Gadish, Kravarič and finally in birthplace, in Skifteraj.

During the entire time that he served in these mosques, Jonuz Zejnullahu continuously had trouble with the Yugoslav police, who stopped him, interrogated him, threatened him and arrested him. The Yugoslav police arrested him six times, twice he was arrested in Viti, and four times in Gjilan.

During the Insurgency in Kosovo Jonuz Zejnullahu participated in the various demonstrations that took place in the cities of Kosovo.

== Kosovo War ==
With the appearance of the KLA, Hoxhë Jonuzi organized the collection of various aids for the KLA and when the NATO bombings began, he joined the ranks of the Kosovo Liberation Army, as a soldier in Brigade 138 "Agim Ramadani".

On May 5, 1999, at the place called "Rrasa e Zogut" in Koshare, in the district of Gjakova, Hoxha Jonuz Zejnullahu greeted his fellow soldiers-combatants and with C4 bombs in packed on his body and suicide-bombed a nearby Serbian bunker, killing himself as well as many Yugoslav soldiers (according to TVSH 5 soldiers). His remains were later buried in the nearby town of Bajram Curri, after the war, he was reburied into the "Martyr's Cemetery" his hometown in Vitia.

== Aftermath ==
For his courage, bravery, commander Rrustem Berisha, declared: "Mic Sokoli of the XXI century was born"

A memorial in his Honour was erected in his Home village of Gjylekar.
