= Parteš =

Parteš: Partesh or Parteshi (Albanian) Parteš or Партеш (Serbian)
- Town and municipality
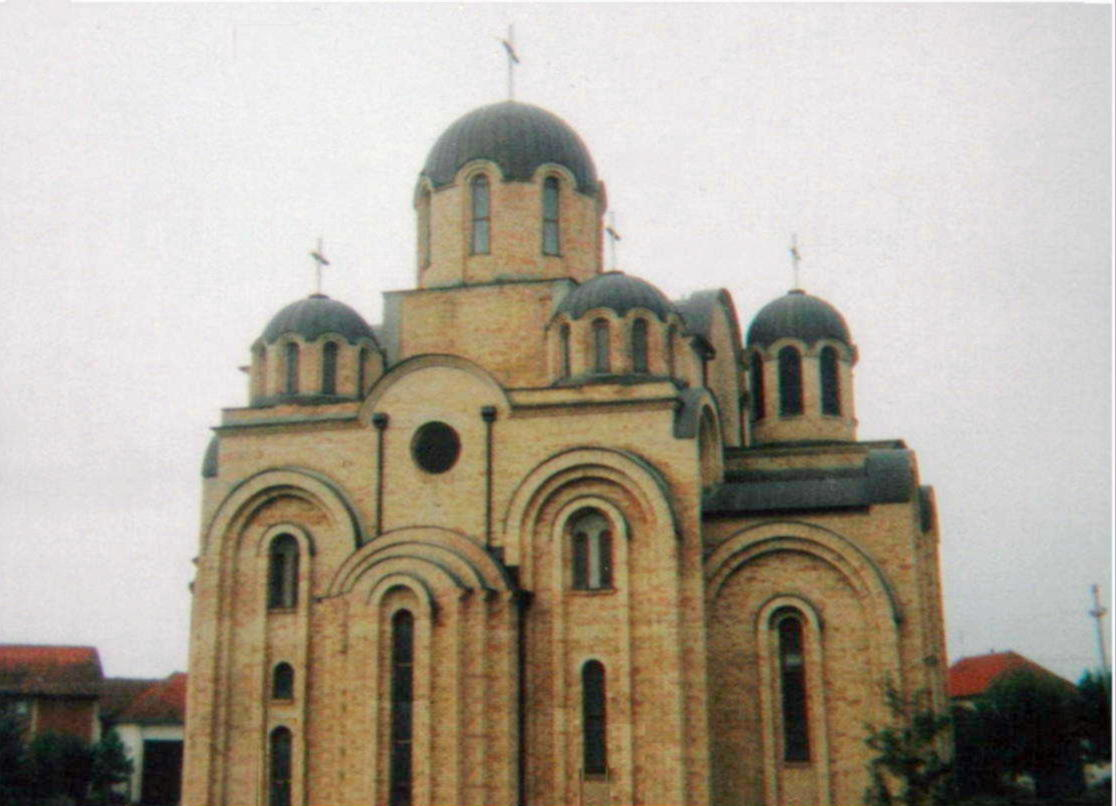
- Church of the Holy Trinity in Parteš

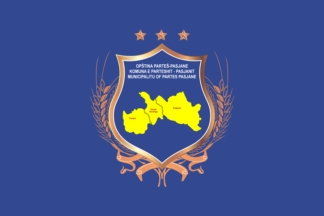
- Flag Emblem
- Interactive map of Parteš
- Location within Kosovo
- Coordinates: 42°24′07″N 21°26′01″E
- Country: Kosovo
- District: District of Gjilan
- Settlements: 3
- Municipality status: 19 August 2010

Government
  - Mayor: Dragan Petkovic (SL)

Area
  - Municipality: 18.3 km^{2} (7.1 sq mi)
- Elevation: 473 m (1,552 ft)

Population (2024)
  - Municipality: 3,251
  - Density: 178/km^{2} (460/sq mi)
- Time zone: UTC+1 (CET)
  - Summer (DST): UTC+2 (CEST)
- Postal code: 38251
- Vehicle registration: 06
- Website: partesh.rks-gov.net

Parteš (Serbian Cyrillic: Партеш) or Partesh (Albanian definite form: Parteshi), is a town and municipality located in the Gjilan District of Kosovo. The municipality was established on 19 August 2010. It is inhabited by Serbs, and as of 2013, it has an estimated population of 5,300 inhabitants.

== Settlements ==
The municipality consists of town of Parteš and two villages: Pasjane and Donja Budriga.

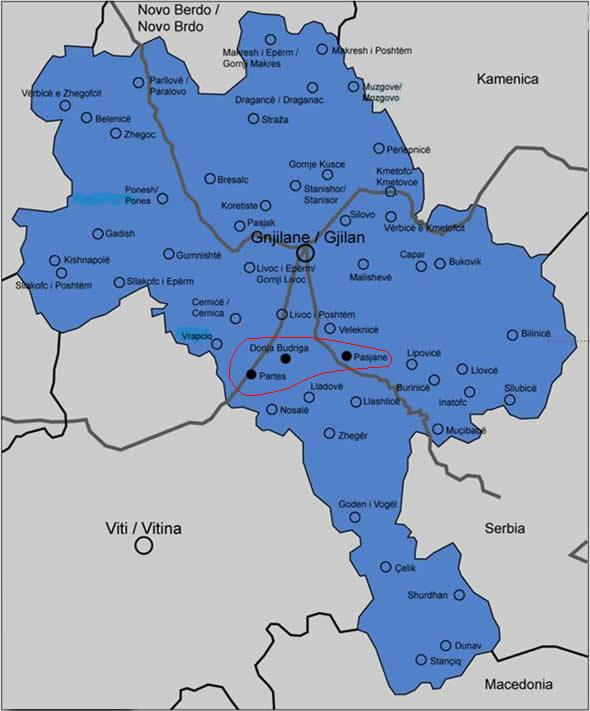
Parteš, in relation to Gjilan (in the former Gjilan Municipality).

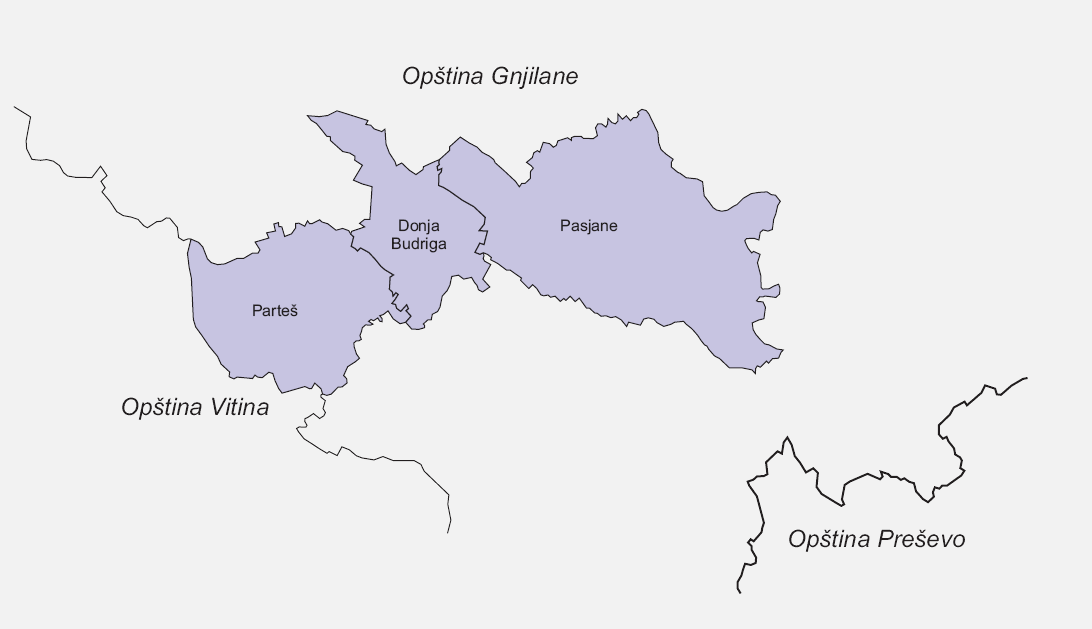
Parteš Municipality.

== Culture ==
The settlements of Parteš, Donja Budriga and Pasjane are inhabited by ethnic Serbs. There are four Serbian Orthodox churches within the municipality. There are pilgrimage sites at medieval religious ruins. There is also one cultural center in Parteš, one in Donja Budriga, and one in Pasjane.

== Economy ==
The economy is based mainly on dairy production and small trade.

== Education ==
There are two primary schools and five secondary schools within the municipality.

== Demographics ==
The municipality of Parteš is inhabited by ethnic Serbs. The ECMI calculated, based on 2010 and 2013 estimations, that the Parteš municipality was inhabited by 5,300 Serbs (99.96%).

According to the 2011 census, which is unreliable due to partial boycott by Serbs and other minorities, the settlement of Parteš alone had 478 residents, all of whom were Serbs (100%); the Parteš municipality had 1,787 residents, 1,785 of whom were Serbs (99.9%). The municipality of Parteš includes the town and two villages. It is one of the Serbian enclaves in Kosovo (located outside Serb-inhabited North Kosovo), alongside five other municipalities: Gračanica, Štrpce, Novo Brdo, Ranilug and Klokot. After the Brussels Agreement of 2013, representatives of Serbia and Kosovo agreed that the municipality was to become part of the Community of Serb Municipalities.

Demographic history
Settlement	1948	1953	1961	1971	1981	1991
Donja Budriga	617	689	801	983	1.018	1.178
Parteš	775	878	1.009	1.203	1.274	1.513
Pasjane	1.325	1.448	1.508	1.845	1.974	2.030
Total	2.717	3.015	3.318	4.031	4.266	4.721

== Politics ==
The municipality in planned to be included in the Community of Serb Municipalities, according to the 2013 Brussels Agreement.

The 2013 local elections, held in November, saw 2,770 voters, 63.8% of the total number of registered voters in the Parteš municipality (4,342) according to the last elections. The elections saw the following results in the local government, the municipal assembly which has 15 seats:

- Independent Liberal Party (SLS), 37.60%—6 seats
- Citizens' Initiative Srpska (GIS), 18.20%—3 seats
- Democratic Initiative (DI), 13.04%—2 seats
- People's Initiative (NI), 12.57%—2 seats
- Serb Citizens' Initiative Pasjane (SGI P), 6.02%—1 seat
- Serb Citizens' Initiative Donja Budriga (SGI DB), 6.02%—1 seat

== See also ==
- Municipalities of Kosovo
- Cities and towns in Kosovo
- Populated places in Kosovo

== Sources ==
- "Profile of Parteš/Partesh". OSCE. September 2015.
- "Community Profile: Serb Community" (PDF). ECMI Kosovo. 2013. Archived from the original (PDF) on 2017-01-16.
