= Church of the Holy Mother of God, Podgorce =

Serbian Orthodox church in Gjilan, Kosovo

Church of the Holy Mother of God Црква Свете Богородице у Подгорцe Kisha e Zonjës së Bekuar në Podgorcë

Religion
- Affiliation: Serbian Orthodox
- Year consecrated: 1996

Location
- Location: Podgorce, Kosovo

Church of the Holy Mother of God was a Serbian Orthodox Church located in the village of Podgorce, in the municipality of Vitina, in Kosovo and Metohija. It belonged to the Diocese of Raška and Prizren of the Serbian Orthodox Church. The church was rebuilt and consecrated in 1996.

== The destruction of the church in 1999 ==
The church was looted and burned by Kosovo Albanians after the arrival of the US KFOR troops.
