= Pozharan =

Village in Viti, Kosova

Pozharan: Pozharan (Albanian)
- Village
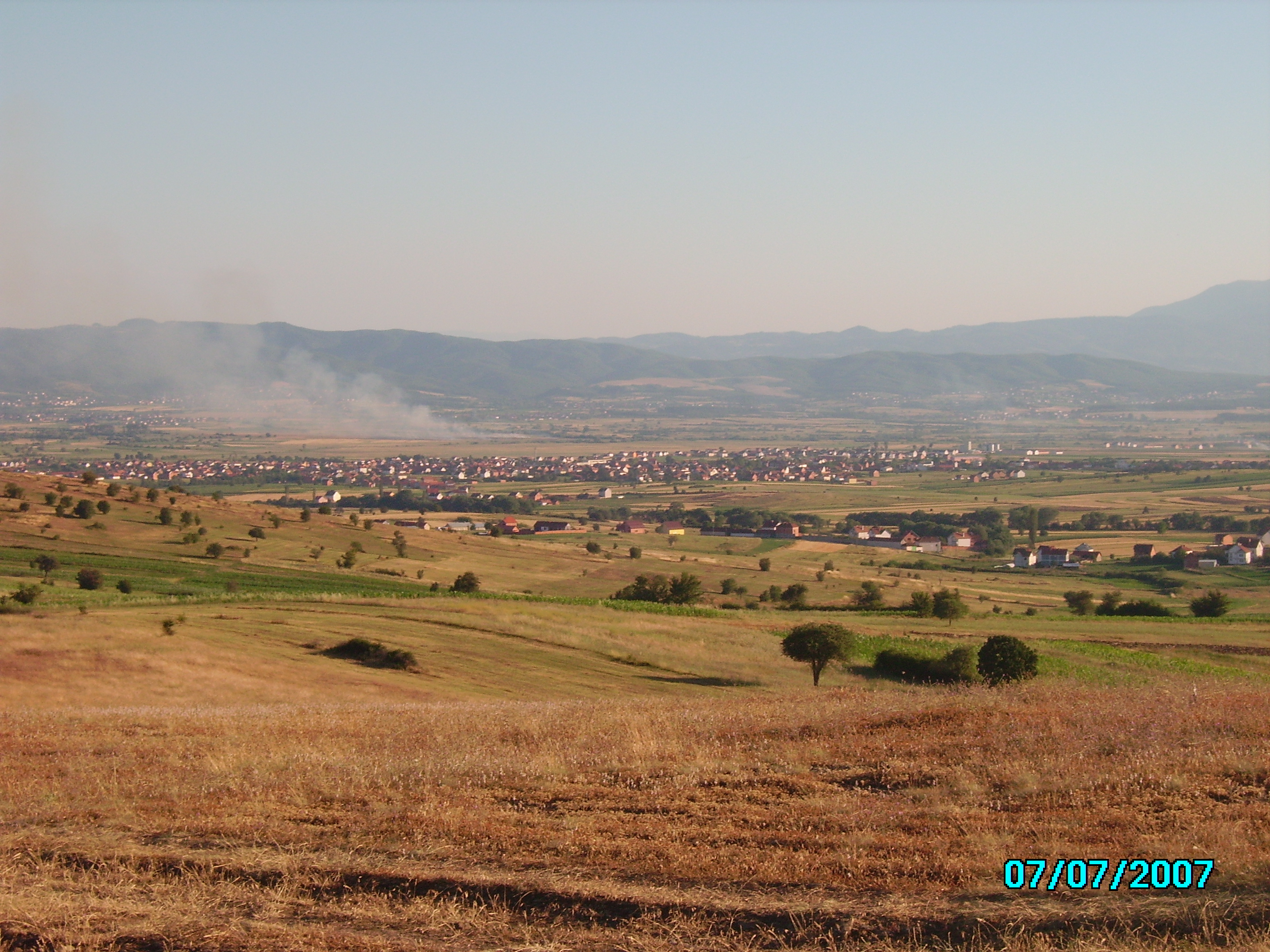

- Location within Kosovo
- Coordinates: 42.364808°N 21.337234°E
- Country: Kosovo
- District: Gjilan
- Municipality: Viti

Population (2024)
  - Total: 3,323
- Time zone: UTC+1 (CET)
  - Summer (DST): UTC+2 (CEST)

Pozharan or Požaranje (in Serbian; Пожарање), is a village in the Viti, southeast Kosovo.

== History ==
Until 1975, it was known as Požeranje (Пожерање) and had been the seat of its municipality.

== Demographics ==
According to the 2024 census the population is 3,323, of which nearly all of them are ethnic Albanians.

== Sports ==
The local football club is KF Vllaznia Pozheran, who played in the Football Superleague of Kosovo in the 2017–18 season.

== Notable people ==
- Sinan Hasani, Yugoslav politician
- Mejdi Korrani (d. 19/4/1999), KLA
- Xhevat Qerimi, KLA commander
- Naser e Jeton Rama, KLA
- Festim Alidema Football
- Sami Piraj, composer
- Islam Pira, Founder of the first Albanian school.
