= Rrahim Beqiri =

Kosovan military commander (1957–2001)

- Born: 1 January 1957; Kamenica, SAP Kosovo, Yugoslavia
- Died: 2 August 2001 (aged 44); Pristina, Kosovo
- Military career
- Allegiance: Kosova; National Liberation Army; Liberation Army of Preševo, Medveđa and Bujanovac
- Branch: Kosovo Liberation Army; National Liberation Army; Liberation Army of Preševo, Medveđa and Bujanovac
- Service years: 1998–2001
- Rank: Commander
- Nickname: Komandant Roki
- Units: 112 Brigade (NLA, Macedonia)
- Commands: Marec Operative Zone (KLA, Kosovo); Tetovo area (NLA, Macedonia)
- Wars and battles: Kosovo War; Battle of Marec; Insurgency in the Preševo Valley; 2001 insurgency in Macedonia; Operation MH; Battle of Tetovo †

Rrahim Beqiri (Albanian: Rrahim Beqiri; Macedonian: Рахим Беќири, 1 January 1957 – 2 August 2001), or better known as Komandant Roki, was a Kosovan military officer. Born into an Albanian-Kosovan family in Koprivnica, Kamenica, he joined the Kosovo Liberation Army (KLA) as a commander of the Marec operative zone in Lipjan after the Kosovo War (1998–1999) broke out. He joined the Liberation Army of Preševo, Medveđa and Bujanovac (UÇPMB) during the subsequent insurgency in the Preševo Valley (1999–2001). Following the outbreak of the 2001 insurgency in Macedonia, Beqiri joined the National Liberation Army (NLA) and infiltrates the Kosovo-Macedonian border, where he started attacking the Macedonian security forces. He was one of the commanders of the 112 Brigade of the NLA, which is active in the Tetovo area. Beqiri was wounded by the Macedonian security forces during a clash in Drenovec, a suburb, in the Battle of Tetovo. He was immediately transferred to the hospital in Poroj and then to the one in Pristina, where he died on 2 August 2001.

== See also ==
- 2001 insurgency in Macedonia
