= Gnjilan (Pirot) =

Gnjilan Гњилан
- Village
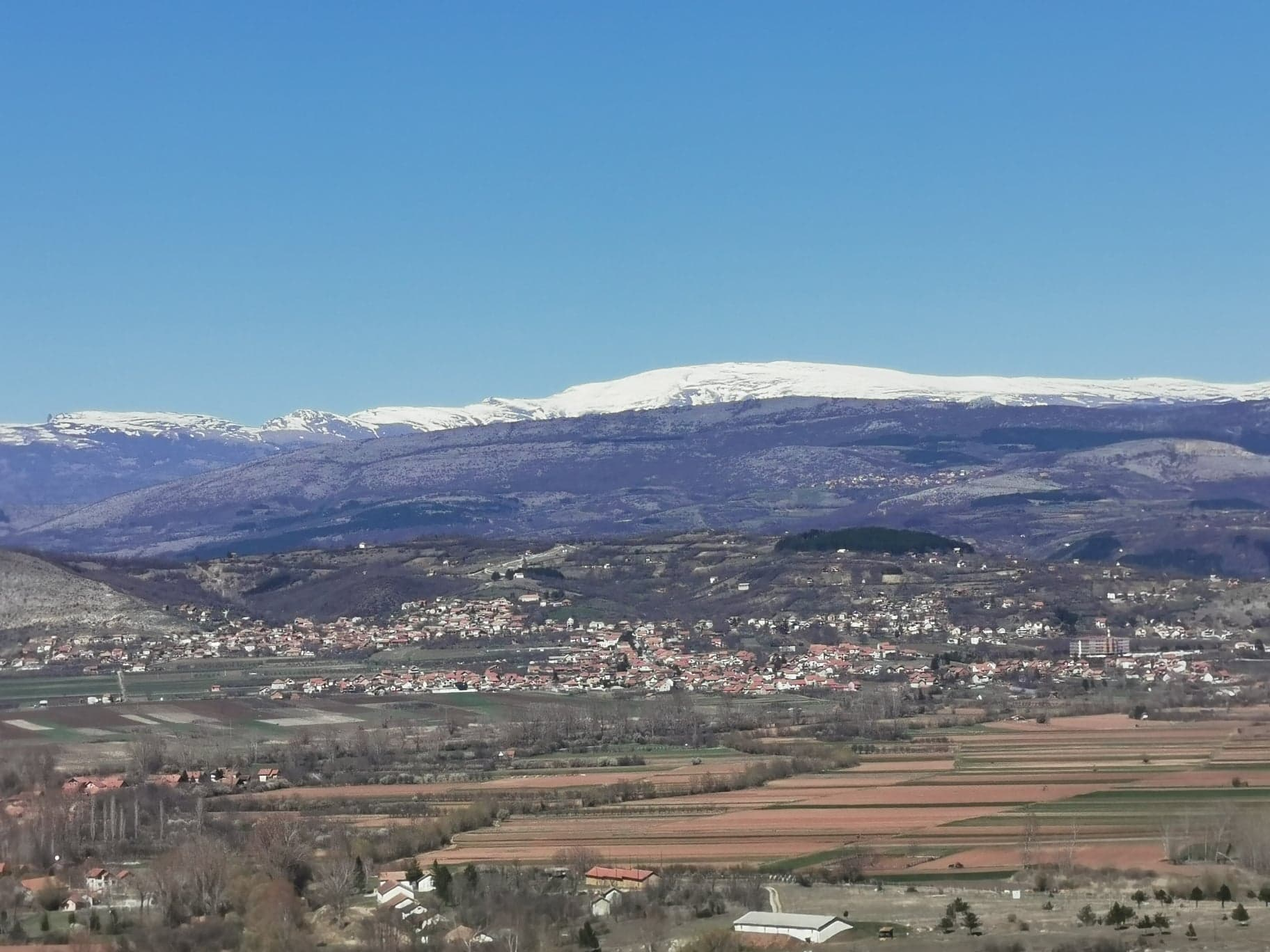

- Location within Serbia
- Coordinates: 43°09′44″N 22°33′18″E
- Country: Serbia
- Region: Southern and Eastern Serbia
- District: Pirot
- Municipality: Pirot

Population (2002)
  - Total: 2,478
- Time zone: UTC+1 (CET)
  - Summer (DST): UTC+2 (CEST)

Gnjilan (Serbian Cyrillic: Гњилан) is a village in the municipality of Pirot, Serbia. According to the 2002 census, the village has a population of 2478 people.

== See also ==
- Populated places in Serbia
