= Liberation Army of Preševo, Medveđa and Bujanovac =

Albanian militant group (1999–2001)

- Ushtria Çlirimtare e Preshevës, Medvegjës dhe Bujanocit
- Leaders: Shefket Musliu (surrendered); Muhamet Xhemajli (surrendered); Ridvan Qazimi †; Njazi Azemi †; Bardhyl Osmani †
- Dates active: 1999–2001
- Headquarters: Dobrosin
- Active regions: Ground Safety Zone, Preševo Valley, Yugoslavia
- Ideology: Albanian nationalism Greater Albania
- Size: 5,000 (1,500 active)
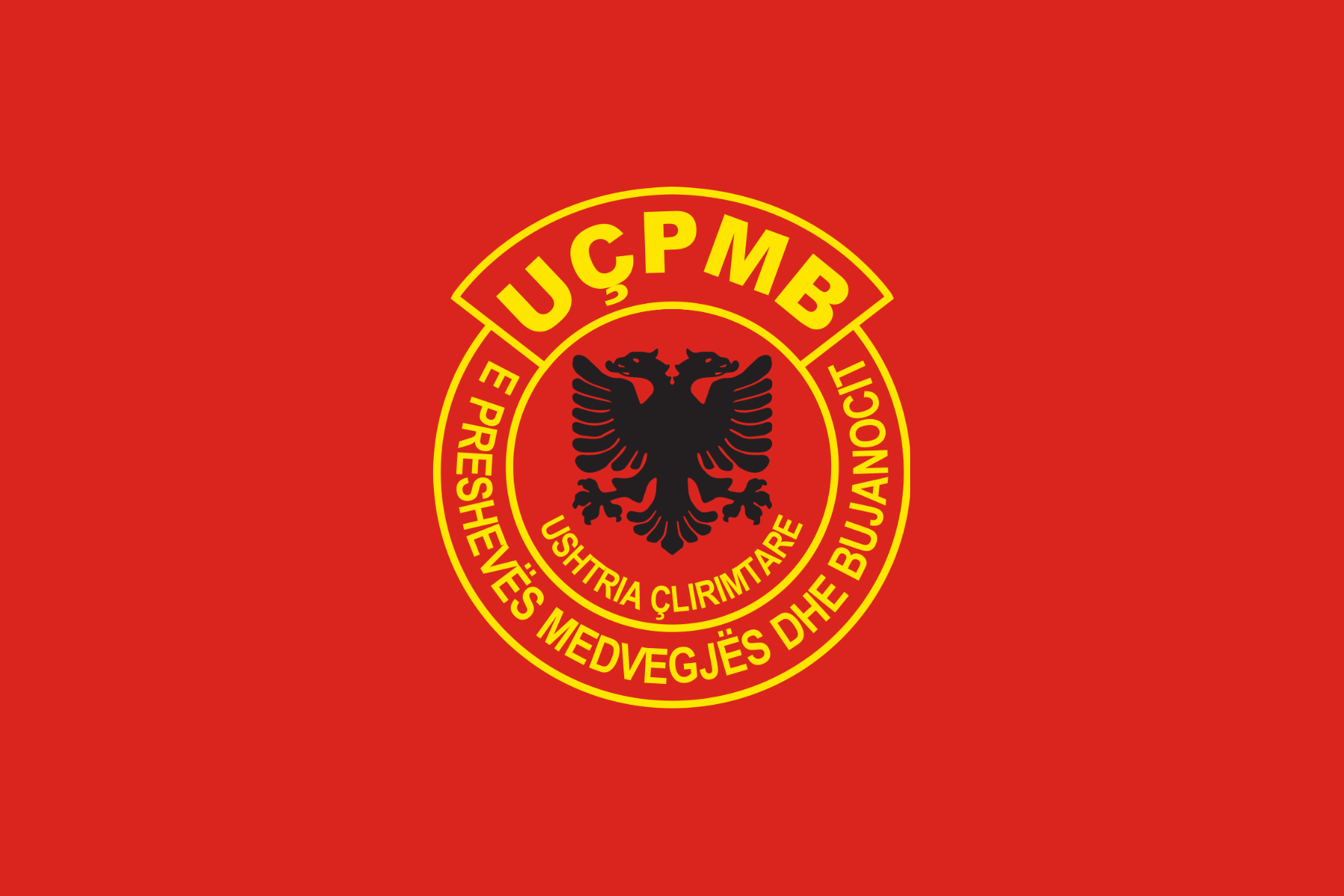
- Flag

The Liberation Army of Preševo, Medveđa and Bujanovac (LAPMB; Albanian: Ushtria Çlirimtare e Preshevës, Medvegjës dhe Bujanocit, UÇPMB; Serbian: Ослободилачка војска Прешева, Медвеђе и Бујановца, ОВПМБ, romanized: Oslobodilačka vojska Preševa, Medveđe i Bujanovca, OVPMB) was an Albanian militant insurgent group fighting for separation from the Federal Republic of Yugoslavia for three municipalities: Preševo, Medveđa, and Bujanovac, home to most of the Albanians in south Serbia, adjacent to Kosovo. Of the three municipalities, two have an ethnic Albanian majority, while Medveđa has a significant minority of them.

The UÇPMB's uniforms, procedures and tactics mirrored those of the then freshly disbanded Kosovo Liberation Army (KLA). The 1,500-strong paramilitary launched an insurgency in the Preševo Valley from 1999 to 2001, with the goal of joining these municipalities to Kosovo. The EU condemned what it described as the "extremism" and use of "illegal terrorist actions" by the group.

== Background ==
In 1992 and 1993, ethnic Kosovar Albanians created the Kosovo Liberation Army (KLA) which started attacking police forces and secret-service officials who abused Albanian civilians in 1995. Starting in 1998, the KLA was involved in frontal battle, with increasing numbers of Yugoslav security forces. Escalating tensions led to the Kosovo War in February 1998.

== History ==
After the end of the Kosovo War in 1999, a three-mile "Ground Safety Zone" (GSZ) was established between Kosovo (governed by the UN) and inner Serbia and Montenegro. Yugoslav Forces (VJ) units were not permitted there, and only the lightly armed Serbian Ministry of Internal Affairs forces were left in the area.

The exclusion zone included the predominantly Albanian village of Dobrosin, but not Preševo. Serbian police had to stop patrolling the area to avoid being ambushed. Ethnic Albanian politicians opposed to the KLA were attacked, including Zemail Mustafi, the vice-president of the Bujanovac branch of Slobodan Milošević's Socialist Party of Serbia who was later assassinated.

Between 21 June 1999 and 12 November 2000, 294 attacks were recorded. 246 in Bujanovac, 44 in Medveđa and 6 in Preševo. These attacks resulted in 14 people killed (of which six were civilians and eight were policemen), 37 people wounded (two UN observers, three civilians and 34 policemen) and five civilians kidnapped. In their attacks, UÇPMB used mostly assault rifles, machine guns, mortars and sniper rifles, but occasionally also RPGs, hand grenades, and anti-tank and anti-personnel mines.

The UÇPMB included child soldiers from their mid-teens.

The Liberation army of Preševo, Medveđa and Bujanovac aimed to create autonomy for the three Albanian municipalities within Serbia and drive Serbian institutions out and hold an election for unification with the Republic of Kosovo.

On 4 March 2000, around 500 UÇPMB fighters attacked the city of Dobrosin. The battle resulted in one UÇPMB and one Serb fighter killed, while another 175 were displaced. On 21 November 2000, members of the UÇPMB attacked the city of Dobrosin and the surrounding villages. Heavy fighting resulted in the VJ retreating to Končulj, Lučane, and Bujanovac. After four policemen were killed and two wounded by the UÇPMB, the VJ retreated back to the GSZ.

On 6 January 2001, the UÇPMB took control of Gornja Šušaja, and were well received by the locals. On 19 January, in command of Bardhyl Osmani, raided VJ positions near Crnotince. On 20 January, the VJ launched an attack against the UÇPMB stronghold. The battle lasted for four days when VJ forces were forced to withdraw.

On 13 May 2001, the VJ and Serbian police launched an attack on the UÇPMB in Oraovica before they entered Sector B. The fighting began at 6:10 am when Yugoslav troops entered the city. At 7:00 am, the UÇPMB attacked Serbian police and fired three rockets towards Oraovica and VJ positions. Attacks from the UÇPMB stopped at 8:00 am. On 14 May 2001, the Yugoslav troops captured the city after the UÇPMB attacked again at 2:15 pm.

On 21 May 2001, members of the UÇPMB signed the Končulj Agreement, which resulted in the full demilitarization, demobilization, and disarmament of the UÇPMB. The agreement stated that the VJ was allowed to enter the GSZ by 31 May 2001. At the same time, the Serbian side agreed to sign the Statement on conditional amnesty for members of the UÇPMB, which promised amnesty to UÇPMB fighters on 23 May 2001.

As the situation escalated, NATO allowed the VJ to reclaim the GSZ on 24 May 2001, at the same time giving the UÇPMB the opportunity to turn themselves over to the Kosovo Force (KFOR), which promised to only take their weapons and note their names before releasing them. More than 450 UÇPMB members took advantage of KFOR's "screen and release" policy, among them commander Shefket Musliu, who turned himself over to KFOR at a checkpoint along the GSZ just after midnight of 26 May 2001.

== Aftermath ==
With the signing of the Končulj Agreement in May 2001, the former KLA and UÇPMB fighters next moved to western Macedonia where the NLA was established, which fought against the Macedonian government in 2001. Ali Ahmeti organized the NLA from former KLA and UÇPMB fighters from Kosovo, Albanian insurgents from the UÇPMB in Serbia, young Albanian radicals, nationalists from Macedonia, and foreign mercenaries. The acronym was the same as the KLA's in Albanian.

Another Albanian paramilitary organization Albanian National Army (ANA) also had former UÇPMB fighters. The group is associated with FBKSh (National Front for Reunification of Albanians), its political wing. The group participated in attacks against Macedonian forces with the NLA. After the NLA disbanded, the ANA later went and operated in the Preševo Valley.

== Organization ==
The UÇPMB was organized into five brigades, each with their own commanders:

- 111th Brigade, commanded by Sami Haziju
- 112th Brigade, commanded by Ridvan Qazimi
- 113th Brigade, commanded by Bardhyl Osmani
- 114th Brigade, commanded by Muhamet Xhemajli
- 115th Brigade, commanded by Njazi Azemi

== Notable people ==
- Shefket Musliu (surrendered) (highest commander)
- Muhamet Xhemajli (surrendered) (second commander)
- Ridvan Qazimi † (third commander)
- Njazi Azemi † (commander)
- Bardhyll Osmani † (commander)
- Pacir Shicri (surrendered) (spokesman)
- Tahir Dalipi (surrendered) (spokesman)
- Lirim Jakupi (surrendered) (spokesman)
- Jonuz Musliu (surrendered)
- Avdil Jakupi
- Tahir Sinani
- Shaqir Shaqiri
- Mustafa Shaqiri (surrendered)
- Nagip Aliu (surrendered)
- Orhan Rexhepi (surrendered)
- Arben Ramadani †
- Skerdilajd Llagami
- Rrahim Beqiri
- Sami Ukshini †
- Shaban Ukshini †
- Rabit Saqipi
