= Mark Sopi =

Albanian prelate

- Apostolic Administrator of Prizren
- Church: Catholic Church
- See: Apostolic Administration of Prizren
- In office: 24 May 2000 – 11 January 2006
- Predecessor: Administration established
- Successor: Dodë Gjergji
- Other post: Titular Bishop of Celerina (2000-2006)
- Previous post: Apostolic Administrator of Skopje-Prizren (1995-2000)

Orders
- Ordination: 29 June 1968
- Consecration: 6 January 1996 by Pope John Paul II

Personal details
- Born: 26 February 1938 Binçë, Vardar Banovina, Kingdom of Yugoslavia
- Died: 11 January 2006 (aged 67) Pristina, Kosovo

Mark Sopi (1938–2006) was an Albanian prelate of the Roman Catholic Church.

== Biography ==
Mark Sopi was born in Binač, Vitina, Kingdom of Yugoslavia (modern Kosovo) on 26 February 1938. From 1995 to 2006 he was the titular bishop of Celerina. From 1995 to 2000 he served as Apostolic Administrator of the Roman Catholic Diocese of Skopje in Macedonia, while from 2000 until his death in 2006 he was the Apostolic Administrator of the Roman Catholic Apostolic Administration of Prizren. After his death, bishop Dodë Gjergji succeeded him as new Apostolic Administrator of Prizren.
