= Gjylekar =

Gjylekar: Gjylekar (Albanian); Ђелекаре/Đelekare (Serbian)
- Village
- Location within Kosovo
- Coordinates: 42°20′52″N 21°25′40″E
- Location: Kosovo
- District: Gjilan
- Municipality: Viti
- Elevation: 595 m (1,952 ft)

Population (2024)
  - Total: 1,509
- Time zone: UTC+1 (CET)
  - Summer (DST): UTC+2 (CEST)

Gjylekar (Albanian: Gjylekar, Serbian Cyrillic: Ђелекаре/Đelekare) or Skifteraj is a village in Viti municipality, Kosovo.

== Geography ==
The village borders the Anamorava valley in the North and is situated in the Karadak mountains.

== History ==
The ancestors of the inhabitants of the village belong to the Gashi tribe and originally settled in the Gjakova Highlands.

The Austro-Hungarian consulate in Belgrade reported that during February 1913, Serbian military forces massacred nearly all Albanian inhabitants of the village.
