= Smirë =

Smirë: Smirë (Albanian); Смира/Smira (Serbian)
- Village
- Location within Kosovo
- Coordinates: 42.298168°N 21.321202°E
- Location: Kosovo
- District: Gjilan
- Municipality: Viti
- Elevation: 617 m (2,024 ft)

Population (2024)
  - Total: 2,344
- Time zone: UTC+1 (CET)
  - Summer (DST): UTC+2 (CEST)

Smirë (Albanian: Smirë, Serbian Cyrillic: Смира/Smira) is a large village in Viti municipality, Kosovo.
