= Viti, Kosovo =

Viti: Viti or Vitia (Albanian) Vitina or Витина (Serbian)
- Town and municipality
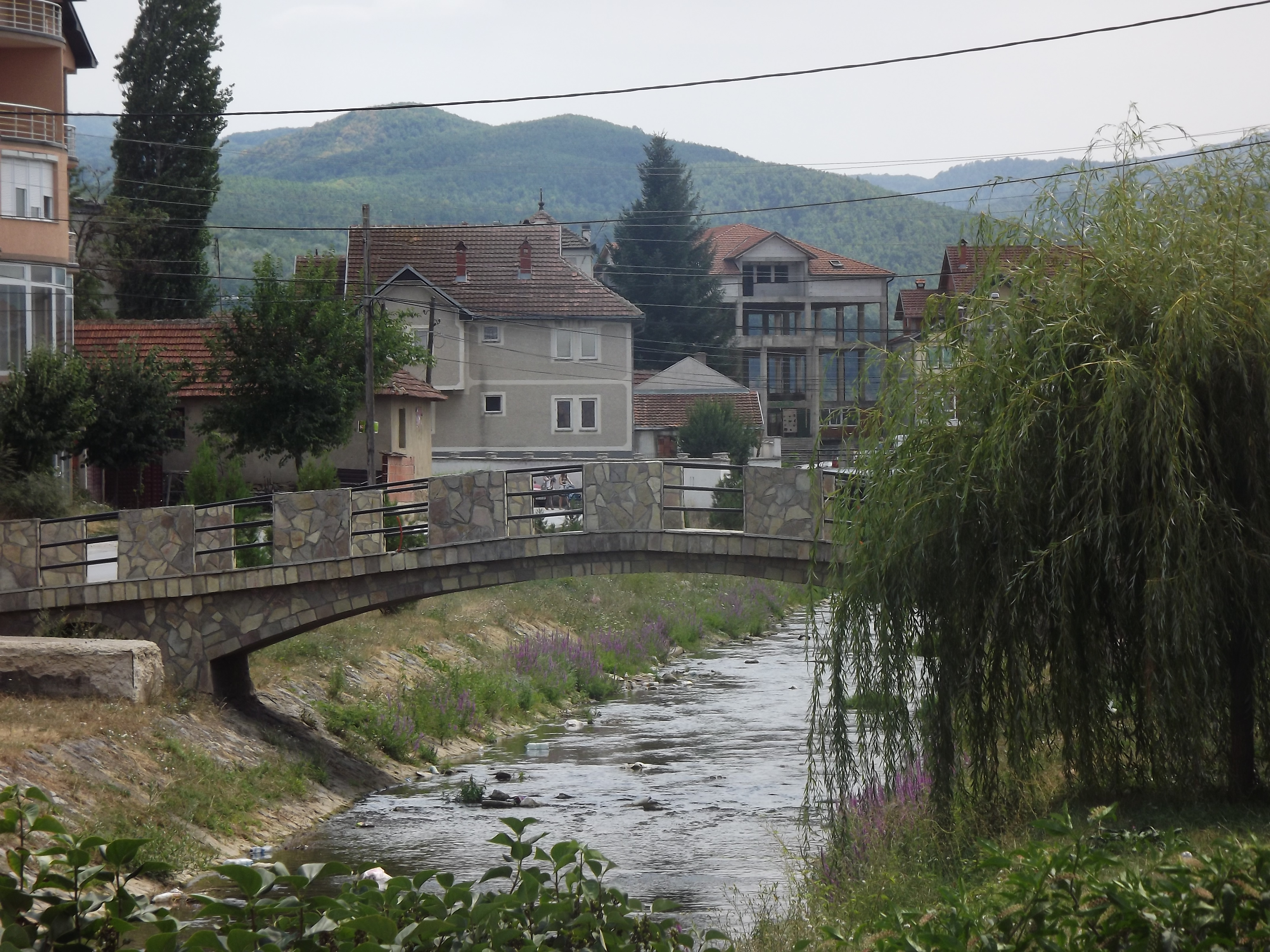
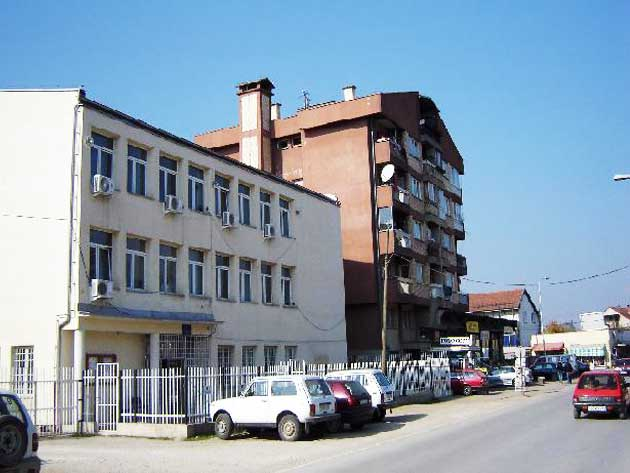
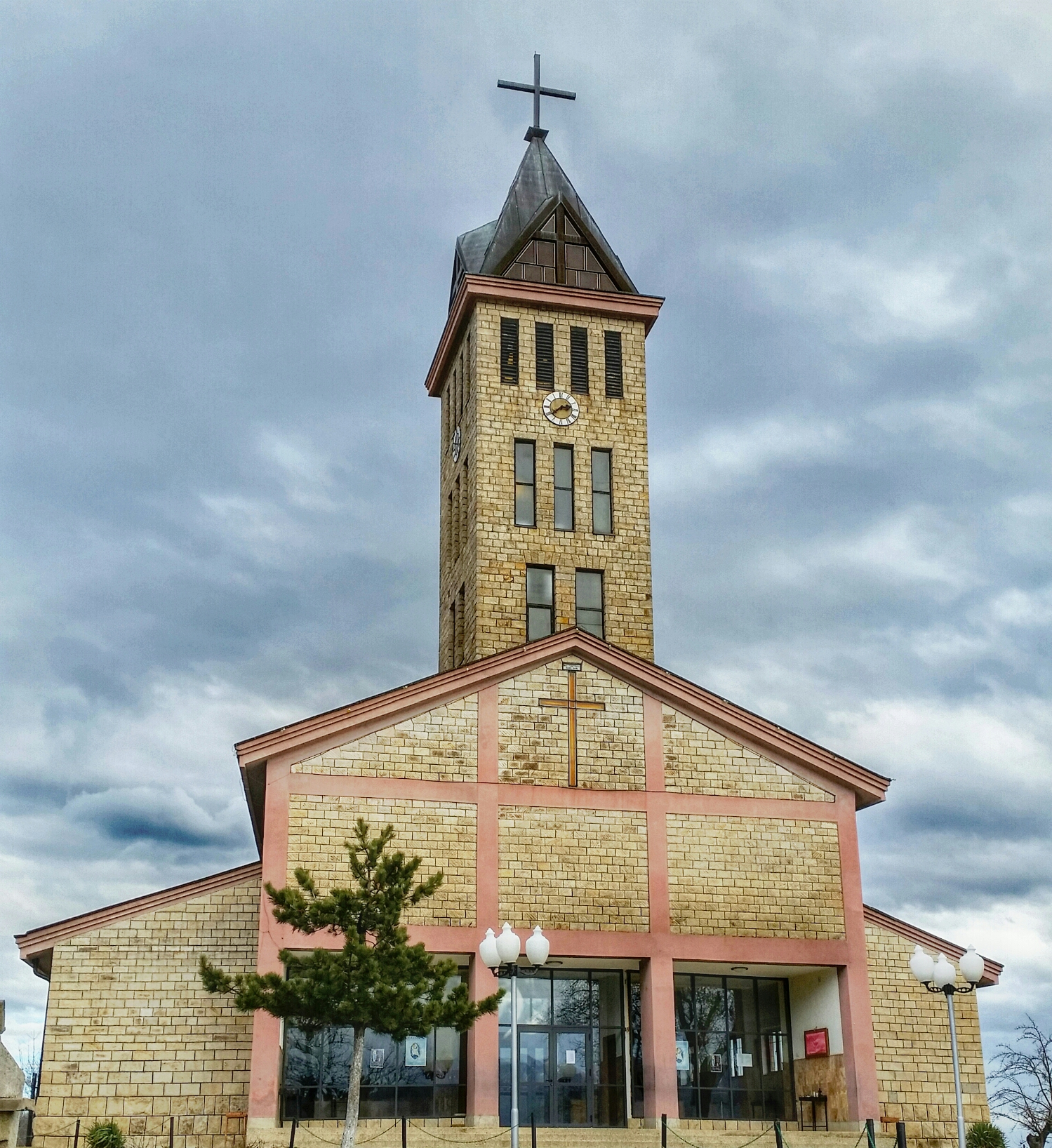
- Morava River Street scene Saint Joseph's Church

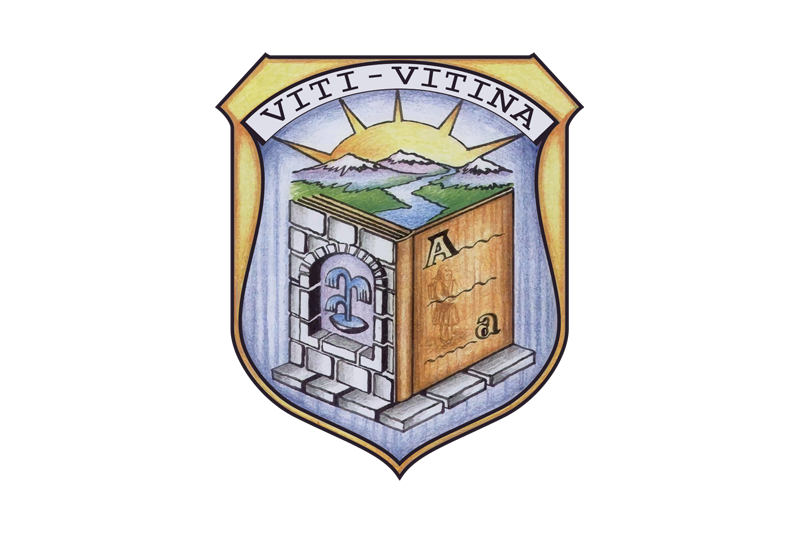
- Flag Emblem
- Interactive map of Viti
- Location within Kosovo
- Coordinates: 42°18′N 21°23′E
- Country: Kosovo
- District: Gjilan

Government
  - Mayor: Sokol Haliti

Area
  - Municipality: 269.69 km^{2} (104.13 sq mi)
  - Rank: 23rd in Kosovo
- Elevation: 499 m (1,637 ft)

Population (2024)
  - Municipality: 35,566
  - Density: 131.88/km^{2} (341.56/sq mi)
  - Urban: 4,924
  - Ethnicity: 99.3% Albanian; 0.7% Other
- Demonym(s): Albanian: Vitias (m), Vitiase (f)
- Time zone: UTC+1 (CET)
  - Summer (DST): UTC+2 (CEST)
- Postal code: 61000
- Area code: +383 38
- Vehicle registration: 06
- Website: kk.rks-gov.net/viti

Viti (Albanian definite form: Vitia) or Vitina (Serbian Cyrillic: Витина) is a town and municipality located in the District of Gjilan in Kosovo. As of 2024, the town of Viti has 5,780 inhabitants, while the municipality has 35,566 inhabitants.

== Etymology ==
The toponym Vitina is of Serbian origin and is derived from the personal name Vita or Vit, which comes from the Slavic root vitъ, meaning “lively,” “vital,” or “energetic.” The suffix -ina is a common Slavic toponymic ending indicating possession or association with a person or feature. The name therefore originally denoted “the settlement belonging to Vita” or “Vita’s place.”

An alternative interpretation links the root to Saint Vitus (Sveti Vid), a saint widely venerated in medieval Slavic regions, suggesting that the name may have originated from land associated with a church, estate, or community dedicated to him.

The Albanian form Viti represents a shortened phonological adaptation of the Slavic name Vitina, reflecting later linguistic usage rather than a separate Albanian lexical origin.

== History ==
=== Ancient times ===
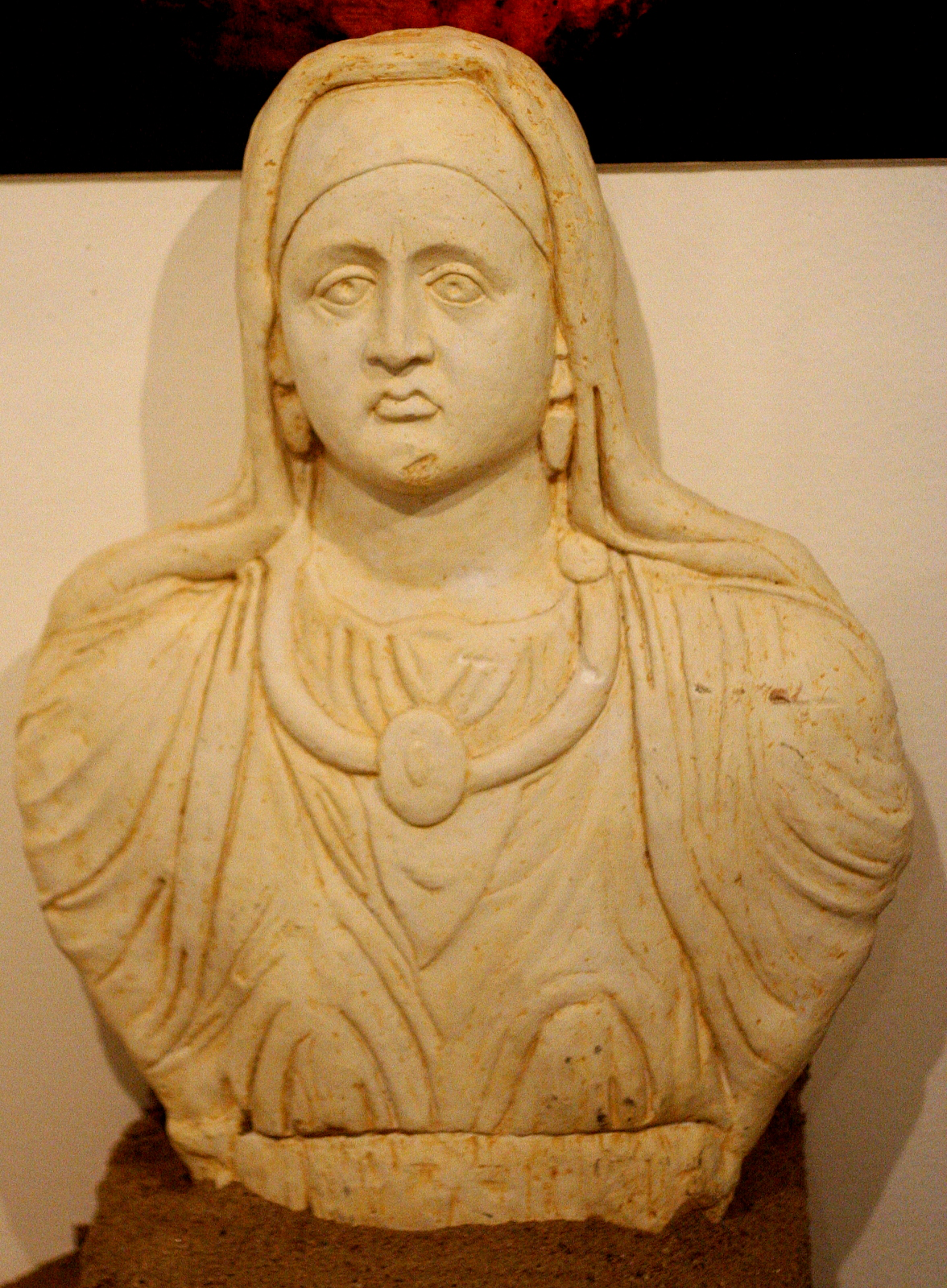
Dea Dardanica, a sculpture of an ancient deity

In the Vërban archaeological site, the statue of Dea Dardanica was found. The sculpture is thought that represents an ancient deity of the Dardani, an Illyrian people, it is considered a masterpiece of the Dardanian art.

=== Ottoman period ===
The municipality has several settlements historically inhabited by the Laramans, crypto-Catholics.

=== Kosovo War and aftermath ===
During the Kosovo War 16 KLA soldiers, as well as 5 Serb soldiers and policemen were killed in Viti. The entire fighting happened in 1999 and in the southern part of the municipality, near the Karadak Mountains, in villages such as Lubishtë, Gjylekare, Mogillë, Smirë, Kabash and Dëbëlldeh.

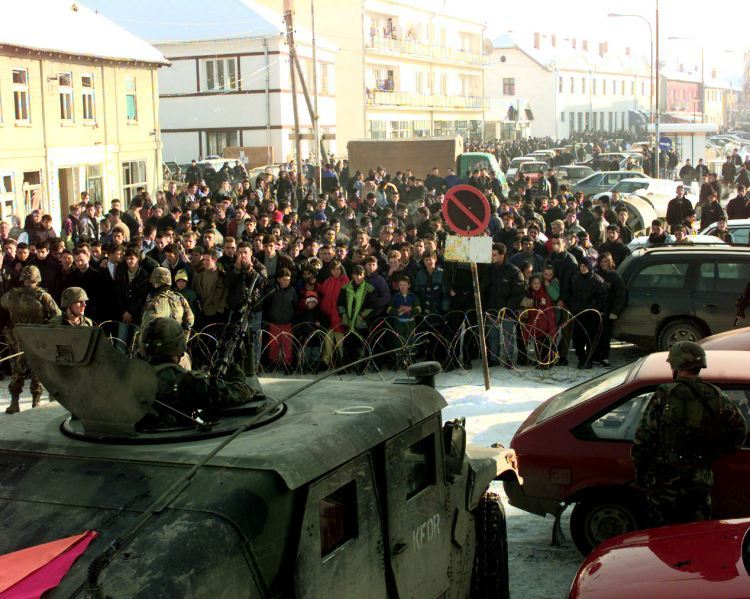
A protest in Viti, monitored by KFOR troops, January 2000.

During and after the Kosovo War 76 civilians were killed, 38 Albanians and 38 Serbs.

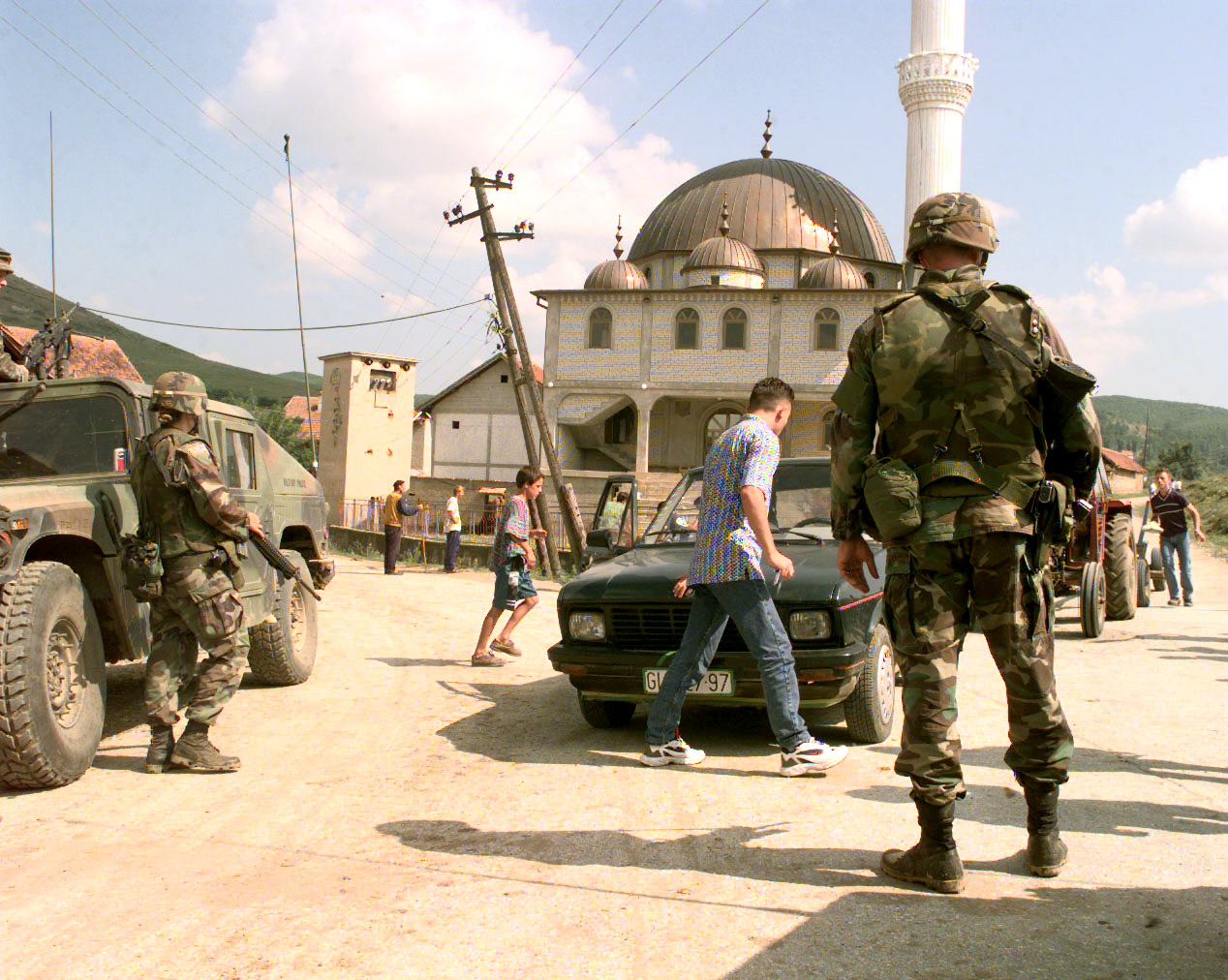
Military checkpoint in Viti, July 1999.

Following the 1999 Kosovo War, it was the home of A Company, 2/505 Parachute Infantry Regiment, 82nd Airborne Division, the first KFOR troops to begin stabilization efforts in the municipality. After the initial unit left, Viti was the site of a subsequent international scandal when a Staff Sgt. Frank J. Ronghi, from A company, 3/504 Parachute Infantry Regiment raped and killed a local girl. The subsequent investigation uncovered serious training and leadership deficiencies in the 3/504 Parachute Infantry Regiment, and catalysed a tremendous change in the training of units deploying for peacekeeping operations. The Church of the Holy Mother of God, Podgorce was looted during the conflict.

During the NATO bombing of Yugoslavia, the Orthodox cemetery in Viti and the village of Dobreš were hit by missiles.

In August 2003, explosive devices planted in Klokot destroyed five Serb houses, with several injuries, including two American KFOR soldiers.

Serbian Orthodox cemeteries have been destroyed in Viti, among other towns, and in 2004 during unrest, nuns of the Binča monastery were physically attacked, by ethnic Albanians.

=== Insurgency in the Preševo Valley ===
During the Insurgency in the Preševo Valley, the UÇPMB mostly recruited fighters from the Karadak region of Kosovo, specifically in the town of Vitia. In February 2001, many towns and villages in the region were covered with posters that instructed Albanians between the ages of 18 and 48 to join their fellow Albanians in the UÇPMB. These posters were supposedly issued by the previously disbanded KLA.

=== Insurgency in Macedonia ===
Amidst the Insurgency in Macedonia, approximately 300 NLA fighters from the Vitia municipality, mostly recruited in Dëbëlldeh and Mjakë, participated in several battles against Macedonian security forces in Tanuševci. The NLA also used Dëbëlldeh and Mjakë as strongholds, where they would store Arms.

=== Contemporary ===
The village of Kllokot, formerly part of the municipality of Viti, was established as a separate municipality on 8 January 2010. This change was implemented in accordance with the Ahtisaari Plan for the decentralization of Kosovo, which proposed the creation of a new municipality with a Serbian majority within the territory Viti municipality.

In 2013 in response to a KLA monument being removed by Serbian authorities in Preševo, a Kosovo Albanian crowd in Viti demolished a Yugoslav-era memorial for anti-fascist Partisans that were killed during the Second World War.

== Geography ==
The municipality and the town of Viti is located in the southeastern Kosovo. The town is located around 20 km (12 mi) away from both Ferizaj and Gjilan. Viti and the southern part of the municipality lie on the foothills of the Karadak Mountains.

== Municipality ==
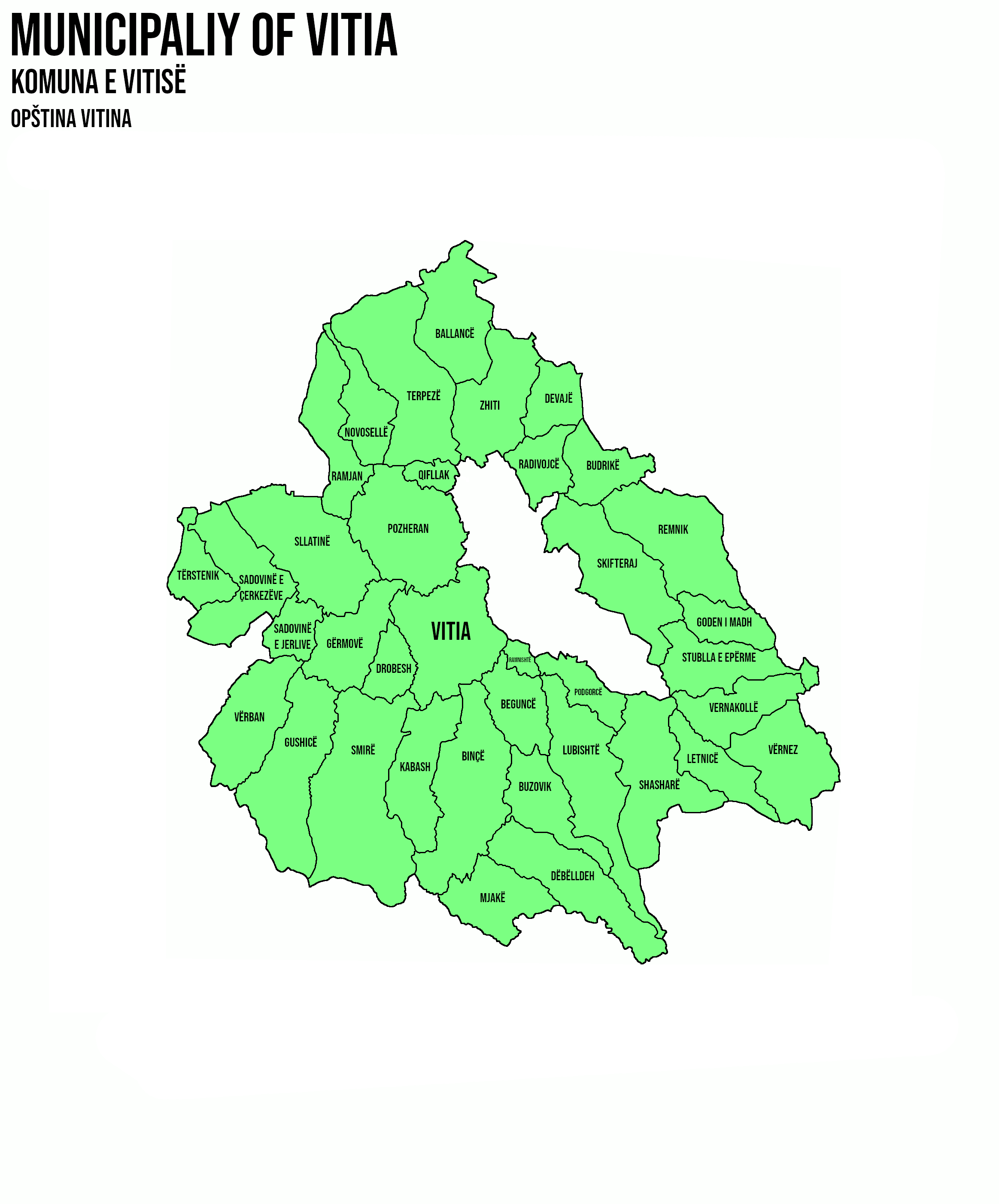
The municipality of Viti and its settlements

- Ballancë
- Beguncë
- Binça
- Budrikë e Epërme
- Buzovik
- Çifllak
- Dëbëlldeh
- Devajë
- Drobesh
- Gërmovë
- Gjylekar
- Goden i Madh
- Gushicë
- Kabash
- Letnicë
- Lubishtë
- Mjak
- Novosellë
- Podgorc
- Pozharan
- Radivojc
- Ramjan
- Ramnishtë
- Remnik
- Sadovinë e Çerkezëve
- Sadovinë e Jerlive
- Shasharë
- Sllatinë e Epërme
- Sllatinë e Poshtme
- Smirë
- Stubëll e Epërme
- Stubëll e Poshtme
- Tërpezë
- Tërstenik
- Vërban
- Vërnakollë
- Vërnez
- Zhiti

== Demographics ==
According to the last census of 2024 by the Kosovo Agency of Statistics, the town of Viti has a 5,780 inhabitants while the municipality has 35,566 inhabitants.

Historical population
Year	Pop.	±% p.a.
1961	33,642	—
1971	39,780	+1.69%
1981	47,839	+1.86%
1991	57,290	+1.82%
2011	46,987	−0.99%
2024	35,566	−2.12%
Source: Kosovo Agency of Statistics

=== Ethnicity and language ===
The municipality is homogeneously Albanian where 99.3% of the population identifies as ethnic Albanian. The dialect of the Albanian language spoken by the inhabitants is Gheg.

=== Religion ===
In terms of religious affiliation, 95% of the population identified as Sunni Muslim. Roman Catholics constituted 3.6% of the population, while 0.4% identified as Orthodox Christian. An additional 0.4% reported adherence to other religions. A small proportion, 0.1%, declared no religious affiliation, and 0.5% refused to answer.

== Notable people ==
- Bastien Toma, footballer
- Betim Halimi, footballer
- Imri Demelezi, from Sllatinë e Poshtme, Deputy Minister of Agriculture, Forestry and Rural Development
- Jonuz Zejnullahu, from Skifteraj, Imam and commander of the KLA.
- Liridon Krasniqi, footballer
- Marko Sopi, from Binač, Catholic prelate.
- Milaim Rama, footballer
- Muharrem Sahiti, from Budrikë, football coach.
- Njazi Azemi, from Mogillë, commander of the KLA and LAPMB.
- Rashit Mustafa, from Lubishtë, commander of the KLA.
- Salih Salihu, Deputy in Kosovan Parliament
- Shemsi Beqiri, from Viti, Kickboxing World Champion.
- Sinan Hasani, from Pozheran, President of Yugoslavia
- Urata Rama, sports shooter
- Visar Ymeri, politician.

== See also ==
- Municipalities of Kosovo
- Cities and towns in Kosovo
- Populated places in Kosovo
