= Binça =

Binçë
- Village
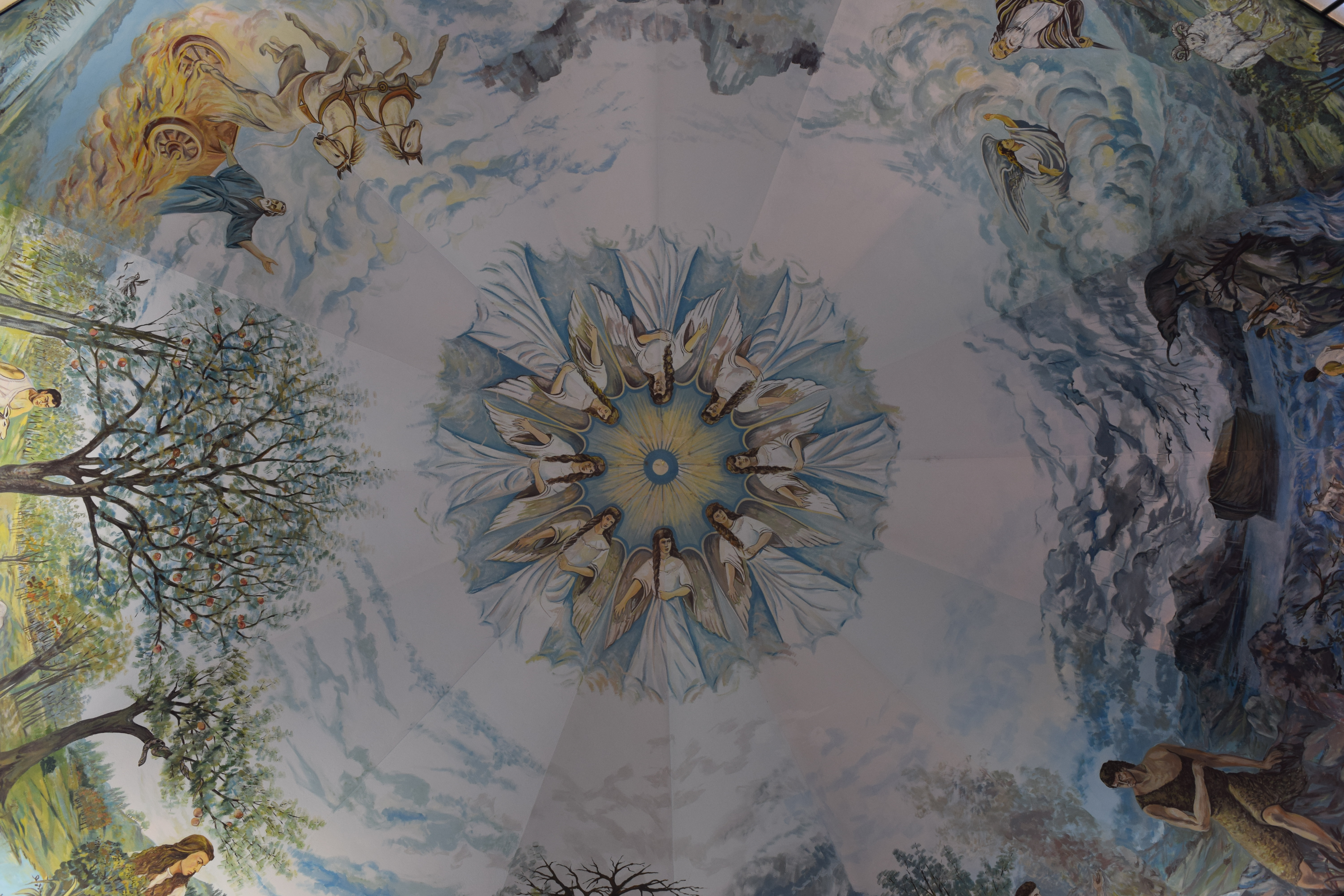
- Church of Morava e Binçës: Binçë (Albanian); Бинач/Binač (Serbian)

- Location within Kosovo
- Coordinates: 42.298045°N 21.363673°E
- Country: Kosovo
- District: Gjilan
- Municipality: Viti

Population (2024)
  - Total: 1,783
- Time zone: UTC+1 (CET)
  - Summer (DST): UTC+2 (CEST)

Binač (Serbian Cyrillic: Бинaч) or Binça (Albanian: Binçë), is a village in the municipality of Viti in southeastern Kosovo. The Binač Monastery was destroyed in 1999, during the Kosovo unrests. It is in the Anamorava region. The Morava e Binçës crosses beside the village. The Albanian church Kisha e Shna Ndout is located in Binça.

== Notable people ==
- Marko Sopi, Albanian prelate

== See also ==
- Populated places in Kosovo
