= District of Gjilan =

District of Kosovo

Coordinates: 42°28′N 21°28′E

District of Gjilan: Rajoni i Gjilanit (Albanian) Gnjilanski okrug/ Гњилански округ (Serbian)
- District of Kosovo
- Location of Gjilan District in Kosovo
- Interactive map of District of Gjilan
- Country: Kosovo
- Capital: Gjilan

Area
  - Total: 1,206 km^{2} (466 sq mi)

Population (2024)
  - Total: 150,176
  - Rank: 6th
  - Density: 124.5/km^{2} (322.5/sq mi)
- Postal code: 60000
- Vehicle registration: 06
- Municipalities: 6
- Settlements: 287
- HDI (2023): 0.778 high · 7th

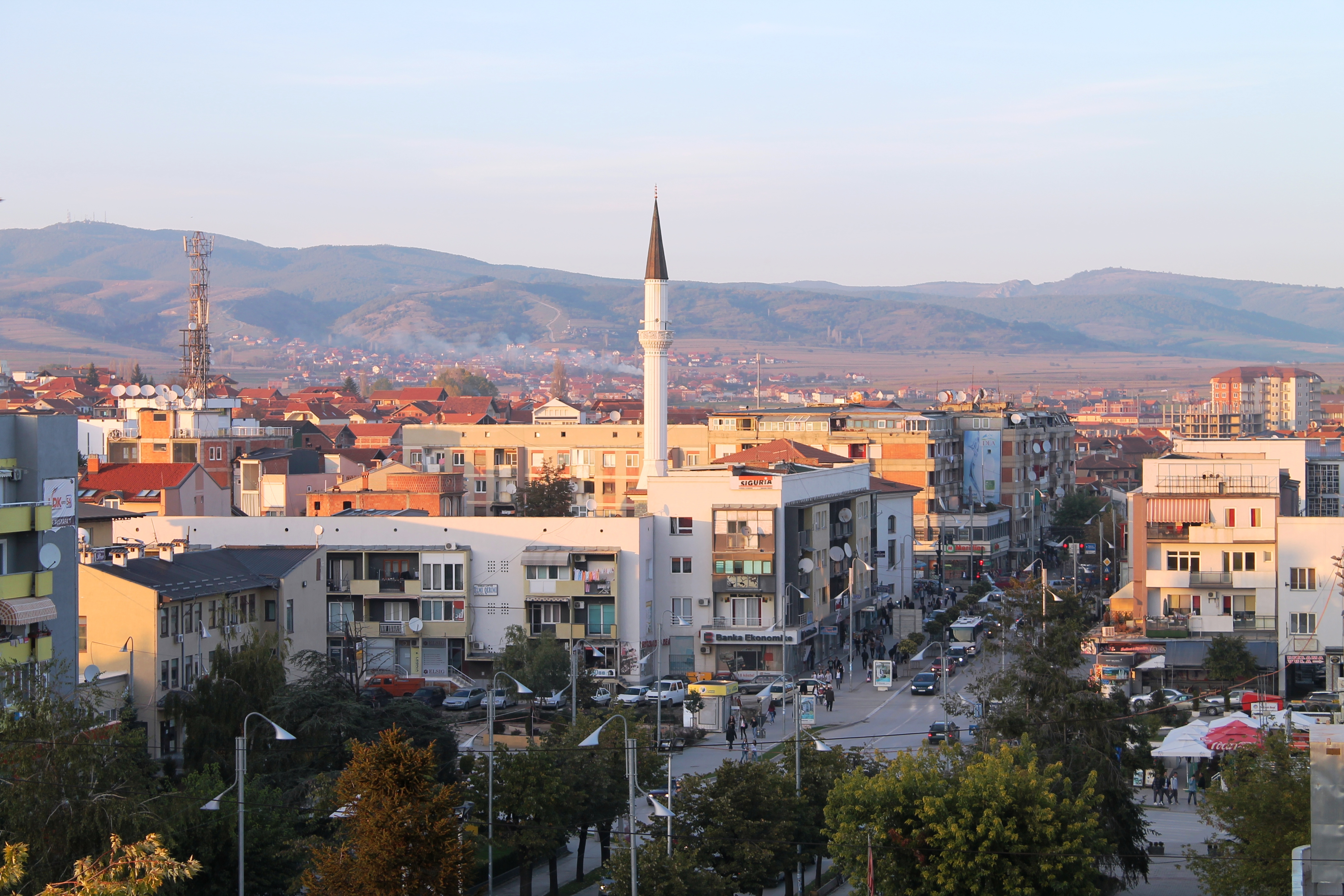
The city of Gjilan

The District of Gjilan (Albanian: Rajoni i Gjilanit; Serbian: Гњилански округ, romanized: Gnjilanski okrug) is one of the seven districts (the higher-level administrative divisions) of Kosovo. Its seat is in the city of Gjilan.

== History ==
Anamorava, literally "side of river of Morava", is the hilly countryside in south eastern Kosovo south of Gjilan and on the Binačka Morava. It stretches eastward to the Preševo (Presheva) valley in Serbia. The mountains in this region rise to an altitude of 1,000 to 1,200 meters, and culminate in the Skopska Crna Gora region bordering neighboring North Macedonia north of Skopje.

== Municipalities ==
The district of Gjilan has a total of 6 municipalities and 287 other smaller settlements:

Municipality	Population (2024)	Area (km2)	Density	Settlements
Gjilan	82,980	385	215.5	54
Viti	35,566	278	127.9	39
Kamenica	22,868	423	54.1	58
Ranilug	2,481	78	31.8	13
Parteš	3,240	18	180.0	3
Klokot	3,041	24	126.7	4
Gjilan District	180,783	1,206	122.6	287

== Demography ==
In 1991, all municipalities of the district had an Albanian majority: Gjilan (76.54%), Kamenica (73.05%), Viti (78.68%).

In the 2011 census, after the creation of new municipalities with Serb population, Albanians are the majority in: Gjilan (97.4%), Kamenica (94.7%), Viti (99.3%), and in Klokot (53.3%). Serbs are the majority in Parteš (99.9%) and in Ranilug (95.49%).

The latest census of 2024 by the Kosovo Agency of Statistics, the district has an overall population of 150,176 inhabitants, with Gjilan being the most populated one with 82,980 inhabitants.

Overall, the largest ethnic group are Albanians and the biggest minority group are Serbs.

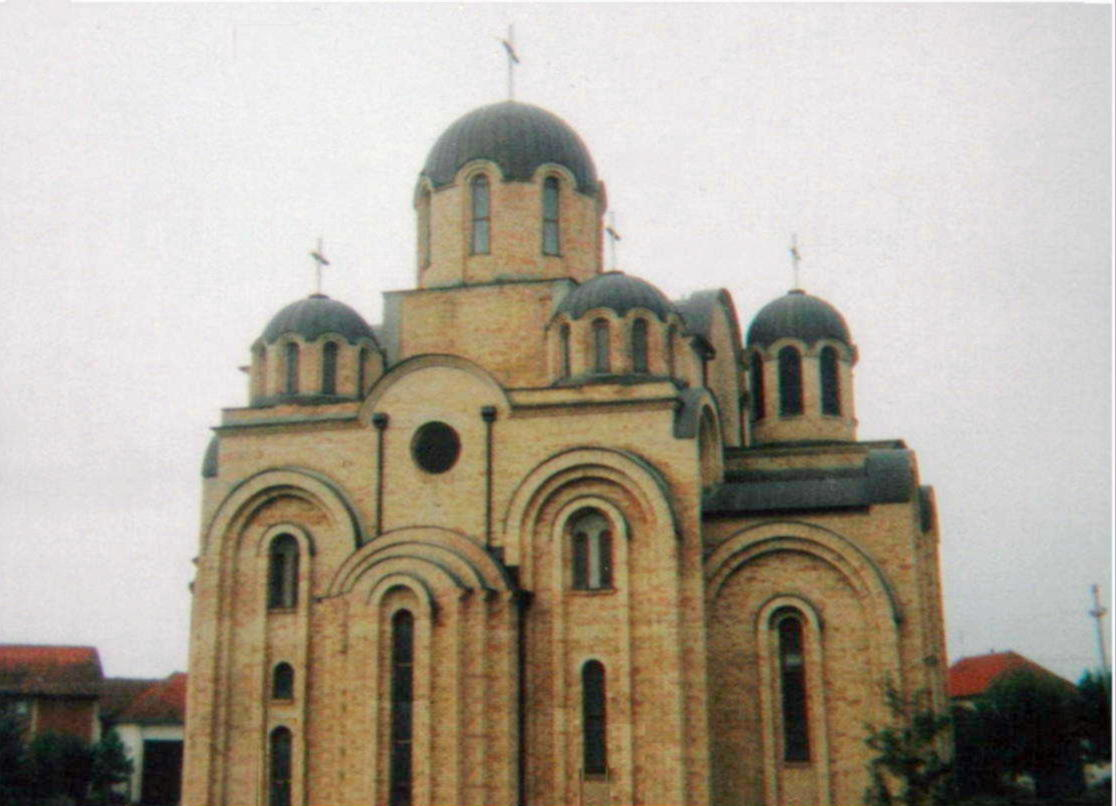
Church of Holy Trinity in Parteš

Ethnic groups in 2011 census:

	Number	%
TOTAL	181,459	100
Albanians	170,053	93.7
Serbs	8,945	4.9
Turks	988	0.5
Roma (Ashkali)	652	0.4
Others and no response	686	0.4

== See also ==
- Administrative divisions of Kosovo
