= Jusuf Baftjari =

Albanian resistance leader

Mulla Jusuf Baftjari
- Born: 1883; Lipovica, Gjilan, Ottoman Empire
- Died: 17 July 1948 (aged 64–65); Gjilan
- Military career
- Allegiance: Italian protectorate of Albania; Albania (German client)
- Branch: Balli Kombëtar
- Service years: 1941–1947
- Rank: Major
- Unit: Karadak battalion
- Conflicts: Insurgency in Karadak–Gollak: First Battle of Preševo
- Awards: Order of Freedom (posthumously)

Mulla Jusuf Baftjari, also known as Hoxhë Lipovica, was a prominent Albanian Imam, later Mullah, Kachak and Ballist commander during the Insurgency in Karadak in World War II, a region predominantly inhabited by Muslim Albanians. He participated in the popular resistance against the Bulgarian fascists, Yugoslav Partisans and Chetniks in the Karadak region. Jusuf Baftjari, was renowned for his wisdom and religious leadership and emerged as a prominent figure among the Albanians of Karadak. Jusuf Baftjari led significant battles in Karadak, Anamorava and Gollak including the one in Rainca of Presheva. On Eid al-Adha in 1944, Jusuf Baftjari organized and led the fighting during the First Battle of Preševo. Even after the end of World War II, Jusuf Baftjari continued the armed resistance against Yugoslavia, being one of the last Ballist leaders in Kosovo to do so.

== Life ==
=== Early life and World War I ===
Jusuf Baftjari, born in 1883 in the village of Lipovicë located in the Karadak Highlands, was renowned for his wisdom, piety, and patriotism. Jusuf Baftjari, initially studied Islam at the Kuttab of his hometown, then furthered his education at the Madrasa of Doberçan, eventually achieving the title of Imam. Serving as an Imam, he held significant esteem as one of the foremost ulema in his region. Besides his mother tongue Albanian, Baftjari also spoke Serbian, Turkish and Arabic. When Serbia reoccupied Kosovo in the autumn of 1918, its forces were met by Albanians revolting against their rule, seeking freedom and national unity. To suppress the uprising and disarm the Albanians, Serbia imposed military rule in Kosovo and undertook harsh measures against the local population. One of the Albanian families from Karadak that had suffered from this terror was the family of Jusuf Baftjari, against whom a military operation had been launched in October 1918; three members of his family were killed in the fighting. Among the adult members of this family, only Jusuf Baftjari had survived the massacre. Cena Stojković (a famous Chetnik from the area), together with 4-5 other Chetnik Serbs and a number of gendarmes, surrounded his house and captured his father, brother, and nephew, while his wife was mistreated. Jusuf Baftjari escaped by hiding in the mountains. The Serb and French army sent them towards the Kopilaqa mountain and killed them in the village of Korbliç. Ten days later, Jusuf Baftjari followed the Chetniks and took revenge, killing Cena Stojković and another Chetnik. Afterward, Jusuf Baftjari became a Kachak and joined the Cheta of Sali Staneci, operating actively in the Karadak zone within the Kachak movement. Jusuf Baftjari surrendered three years later in 1921, and was sentenced to 20 years in prison. He served his sentence in Zenica, Bosnia, but was released 11 years later in 1932.

=== Ballist uprising in Karadak during World War II ===
==== Prelaude ====
After the occupation and partition of Kosovo among fascist states, from mid-May 1941, the majority of the Gjilan district joined Fascist Albania, while Karadak remained under Bulgarian administration. The Albanians of Karadak would not accept the Bulgarian occupation, while the Serbian population of this district largely declared themselves as "Bulgarians of Morava" and were placed in the service of the occupiers against the Albanian population. This led many Albanian families from these villages to be forced to abandon their homes and settle in villages beyond the river Morava. Among these families were those of Jusuf Baftjari's village, who had been relocated since March 1942 to the village of Capar and the village of Malishevë, where they stayed until the surrender of fascist Bulgaria in 1944.

==== Early fighting ====
From the early days of the Bulgarian occupation, Jusuf Baftjari formed his resistance unit, with whom he would stand armed in defense of the Albanian population of the region against the fascist Bulgarian occupiers and their Serbian collaborators. In 1941, Vukosav Mladenović and Stojan Antić, two Chetniks from Velekinca, were transporting weapons from Pçinja to the village of Llashtica, when they were captured by Jusuf Baftjari and his men. They were then disarmed, tortured, bound, and sent into captivity. Later that year, with the intervention of the Bulgarians, they were released on condition that they would help the Bulgarians in killing Jusuf Baftjari. Both of them, alongside several other Chetniks, were killed on April 3, 1942, by Jusuf Baftjari and his men, after failing to kill him in an armed clash. On March 20, 1943, Serbian Chetniks attacked Jusuf Baftjari in his home village but failed to kill him and fled after four Chetniks were killed by him and his forces in battle.

==== Annexation of Eastern Kosovo ====
After the capitulation of Italy on September 8, 1943, new circumstances arose for activities aimed at uniting Albanian inhabited territories with the newly German-occupied Albania. For this purpose, from 16 to 20 September 1943, the Second League of Prizren was formed in Prizren, representing all Albanian lands, including those under German and Bulgarian administration. After the capitulation of fascist Bulgaria on September 9, 1944, Albanian Ballist forces in Karadak occupied and annexed the territory previously belonging to the fascist Bulgarian state (Viti, Zhegër, Kaçanik, Preševo, Bujanovac, Skopje, Kumanovo) with the state of Albania. These forces were mainly from Karadak and were led by commanders such as Jusuf Baftjari, Xheladin Kurbalia, Limon Staneci, Ibrahim Kelmendi, Sylë Hotla etc. The fighting in the annexed lands resumed until mid-November 1944. Starting from September until mid-November, considerable losses were inflicted on Serbian, Macedonian, and Bulgarian Chetnik and partisan units attempting to enter the new borders of Kosovo.

==== Defending the border ====
Jusuf Baftjari engaged in defending the border in the Preševo Valley in the Crnotince-Rajince sector. He was tasked with leading the Ballist forces in the fight against partisan-Chetnik attacks in this sector, at the request of Hamit Kroj and Limon Staneci. During his fight in defending the Border, he was rewarded with the rank of major, with his headquarters located in Crnotince. He remained on this front line for over two consecutive months, during which there were fierce battles resulting in many casualties on the partisan and Chetnik sides.

==== First Battle of Preševo ====
The most fierce battle during the entire Karadak insurgency took place on the day of Eid al-Adha, on 19 September 1944. Partisan forces attacked and entered the Presevo Valley, but after more than 12 hours of intense fighting, they were defeated by the Ballist forces commanded by Jusuf Baftjari and others. Over 100 partisan-Chetniks were killed in action, and a battalion of the 2nd Kos-Met Brigade, consisting of 206 soldiers, was captured. The prisoners were sent to the Preševo prison, while the deceased were buried by the villagers of Rajince.

==== Second Battle of Preševo ====
Two months following the first Battle of Preševo, the partisans again attacked the Preševo Valley on 10–11 November 1944. The final battles were fought in defense of the border of Eastern Kosovo along the railway line of Preševo and Bujanovac, against a numerically superior Yugoslav partisan army. This time, the Ballists were decisively defeated. Only a small number of determined fighters remained with their leaders to continue the resistance, among them Jusuf Baftjari, who with his Cheta withdrew into the wider Karadak Highlands.

==== Battle of Myçybaba ====
On 26 November 1944, the "Council of Leaders of Karadak" convened in the mountains above Preševo, under the leadership of Jusuf Baftjari, Mulla Idriz Gjilani, Adem Stançiqi, Limon Staneci, Xheladin Kurbalia, and Ymer Saqa. During this gathering, the proposal for integrating the Movement for Albanian Resistance in Eastern Kosovo (Karadak, Anamorava, Gollak) with the Movement for Albanian Resistance in other regions of Kosovo and Macedonia received approval. This integration was to be overseen by an organizational and military body, establishing the Headquarters of Zone IV for the Defense of Kosovo, formed as part of the Second League of Prizren. Following the Council, Baftjari and his Cheta went to the village of Myqybaba, to join the forces of Ymer Myqybaba. Soon after Baftjari entered the village, on 30 November 1944, the Battle of Myqybaba unfolded, as Ballist forces clashed with Yugoslav Partisan units along the Myqybaba-Llapushnica gorge. Spearheaded by Ymer Myqybabaj and Jusuf Baftjari, this engagement marked a significant moment in the Karadak insurgency. Hindered by the refusal of passage from Gjilan to Preševo, the XVI Macedonian Partisan Brigade, commanded by Gligorije Šaranović "Gliša", alongside a paramilitary unit from Pasjane and nearby villages from Anamorava (including Serbs and Albanians), consisting of 2,000 soldiers, initiated a pre-dawn assault on November 30. Albanian Ballists, numbering not more than 120 fighters, valiantly resisted for hours, defeating the Partisans over and over again for 4 consecutive assaults. Yet, confronted with mounting enemy reinforcements, now numbering 20,000 men, they eventually withdrew, continuing their resistance in the Llapushnicë gorge and various Karadak villages. The battle brought a high toll on both sides, claiming many casualties, among them Ymer Myqybaba and Jusuf Baftjari's brother, Rifat who died in battle, while Hoxhë's son, Selimi, sustained injuries. In total 12 Ballists died in the clashes. In a vengeful response to their losses, Partisan forces razed 73 in Myqybabë and many more in numerous other villages across Karadak, including those in Jusuf Baftjari's village. Witnesses of the era recount how the flames engulfing Albanian homes were visible from Gjilan, creating the illusion of Karadak ablaze in its entirety.

==== Battle of Desivojca and recapture of Gjilan ====
On 1 December 1944, during a meeting in Tërpezë (Viti), in which Jusuf Baftjari participated in, it was decided that all Albanian nationalist forces should unite to liberate and safeguard Gjilan and Ferizaj from the atrocities committed by the Partisans and Chetniks. Following this decision, the Committee of Albanian Resistance for Eastern Kosovo was established on 17 December 1944, in the village Zarbincë of Hashania. Mulla Idriz Gjilani was appointed as the commander in chief. The committee included resistance unit commanders from Karadak and Gollak, such as Xheladin Kurbalia, Jusuf Baftjari, Ymer Myqybaba, Sylë Hotla, and others, aiming to swiftly implement defensive measures against Partisan-Chetnik attacks along the border of Eastern Kosovo.

On 19 December 1944, the 17th Macedonian Brigade, numbering 1800 men, advanced towards Desivojca, seizing control of the surrounding Gollak Highlands before launching an attack on the village. Upon their arrival, the brigade immediately began perpetrating acts of violence and atrocities, including burning homes and killing innocent civilians. In response, a considerable number of Ballists, led by Mulla Idriz Gjilani and Hoxhe Lipovica, mobilized from the mountainous terrain to come to the aid of the villagers. On December 20, 1944, Ballist forces, under the command of Sylë Zarbica, launched a swift assault on the Partisans from the North, while Riza Shkodra led an attack from the south. Simultaneously, a battalion of Partisans, attempting to prevent encirclement, was ambushed and decimated. The confrontation culminated in the complete annihilation of the 17th Macedonian Brigade, resulting in devastating losses. On 23 December 1944, following this decisive victory in the Gollak Highlands, local fighters from Desivojca and other parts of Gollak and Hashania, along with soldiers from Karadak under the command of Jusuf Baftjari, Sylë Hotla and Mulla Idriz Gjilani, marched towards Gjilan with the aim of reclaiming the city, yet their efforts were unsuccessful.

=== Aftermath of World War II ===
After the end of World War II and the communist Yugoslav reoccupation of Kosovo, a segment of Kosovo's nationalist military and political leaders opted to stay in the country, remaining devoted to the cause of the Second League of Prizren. Jusuf Baftjari, along with his sons Selimi and Qazimi and several comrades, sought refuge in the mountains of Karadak, utilizing bunkers and relying on support from allies and collaborators. Despite numerous Yugoslav army operations aimed at capturing or eliminating Jusuf Baftjari, all attempts failed. However, the Yugoslav army inflicted severe punishment upon the population of Karadak, resulting in significant casualties among them. Jusuf Baftjari's Cheta, maintained communication with other Ballist groups engaged in guerrilla warfare in Karadak, including those led by Ali Staneci, Hetë Koka, Hasan Ali Remniku, Hajdar Malisheva, and others. Eventually, representatives of these groups, including Jusuf Baftjari, convened at the Kopilaça Congress on August 15–16, 1945, organized by the remaining Ballists and Kachaks in Karadak. During the congress, Albanian leaders pledged to continue fighting against the communist occupiers. However, in October 1945, Albanian Ballists in Karadak received a letter from Muharrem Bajraktari and Mid'hat Frashëri, urging them to flee to Greece. In response, Mulla Idriz Gjilani intervened, advising the resistance units not to abandon Kosovo but to persist in the fight. Jusuf Baftjari and his Cheta remained steadfast in their commitment to Mulla Idriz Gjilani's directive. By the end of 1946, Yugoslav authorities initiated a comprehensive military operation against Albanian Resistance forces across Kosovo. Despite this crackdown, only 36 rebels, mostly from Karadak, out of 1,735 fighters distributed among 55 guerrilla groups, survived and continued the resistance beyond March 1947.

==== Surrender and Execution ====
After numerous failed operations to capture or eliminate Jusuf Baftjari and his Cheta, the Yugoslav Partisans turned to treachery. Vojo Vojvodić, a Montenegrin leader of the Yugoslav Partisans, assured Jusuf Baftjari that if he surrendered, he would face imprisonment under the Amnesty Law, rather than execution. The relentless torture inflicted by the Yugoslav Partisans on their families and friends, along with the discovery of their hideouts, became unbearable. Even Jusuf Baftjari, realizing that all possibilities for continued resistance were closing, surrendered togetether with his two sons, Selim and Qazim, in Uglar on February 20, 1947. Daut Xhelili of Pogragjë, a former activist, recalled being present when the Yugoslav Partisans brought Jusuf Baftjari to Pogragjë, noting that he refused to surrender his rifle and kissed its barrel. Addressing Vojvodić, Jusuf Baftjari explained his surrender, citing Vojvodić's Montenegrin heritage and the trust that should be inherent in a Montenegrin's word, implying that without this trust, the Partisans would not have captured him alive.

Shortly after however, Jusuf Baftjari was sentenced to death by the Yugoslav court in Gjilan. According to memorial records regarding his execution, a Serb witness named Zarije, a merchant from Gjilan who was also imprisoned in the Gjilan prison, recounted: "Following Jusuf Baftjari's death sentence, one day Vojo Vojvodić, the Partisan chief in Gjilan, visited the prison yard. Upon spotting him through the window, Jusuf Baftjari immediately addressed him: 'Where is your Montenegrin promise?' Vojo simply bowed his head and departed.". On the eve of his execution, Jusuf Baftjari spent the entire night reading the Quran and ultimately prayed two rakats. Zarije also remarked: "Even in the face of execution, Jusuf Baftjari displayed no fear." During his farewell with his sons, he urged them not to despair, asserting: 'Allah gives life and He takes it; we have fought for our fatherland and faith, and for that, we must be prepared to die.'" Jusuf Baftjari was executed on July 17, 1948.

== Legacy ==
Sinan Hasani, the then President of Yugoslavia and a resident from the neighbouring Anamorava region, labeled Jusuf Baftjari as a "terrorist," citing his leadership of a significant Ballist army that engaged in combat against the partisans. Nowadays Jusuf Baftjari is revered as a hero in the Karadak region, where his rifle, along with the rifle of Hasan Ali Remniku, has been enshrined in the ethnographic museum of Gjilan as a tribute to his struggle against the occupiers of Albanian lands. A street located in the center of Gjilan bears the name of Jusuf Baftjari. In 2016, Jusuf Baftjari was posthumously awarded the Order of Freedom by the state of Kosovo.

== Sources ==
- Selmani, Aliriza (2011), Gjithkund ne Kosove solemnisht u kremtua festa e Fiter - Bajramit (in Albanian), Dituria Islame
