= First Battle of Preševo =

World War II battle fought in Bulgaria

- Part of World War II in Yugoslavia
Date	18–24 September 1944
Location	Preševo, Kingdom of Bulgaria (modern-day Serbia)
Result	German-Ballist victory

Belligerents
Balli Kombëtar (Nazi Germany) Germany	Yugoslav Partisans

Commanders and leaders
Mulla Idriz Gjilani; Jusuf Baftjari; Xheladin Kurbaliu; Sulë Hotla; Rrustem Behluli; Mulla Sadik Haliti (Nazi Germany) Alexander Löhr	(Yugoslav Partisans) Abdullah Krašnica

Units involved
Karadak battalion Kachaks from Karadak; SS Skanderbeg (Nazi Germany) Heeresgruppe E	(Yugoslav Partisans) 8th Macedonian Brigade (Yugoslav Partisans) 12th Macedonian Brigade (Yugoslav Partisans) 17th Macedonian Brigade (Yugoslav Partisans) 18th Macedonian Brigade (Yugoslav Partisans) 2nd Kosovska Brigade (Yugoslav Partisans) 3rd Kosovska Brigade

Strength
2,000 men (beginning of the battle, significantly more after arrival of volunteers)	(Yugoslav Partisans) 10,000 men

Casualties and losses
Heavy	In Preševo: (Yugoslav Partisans) 100 killed (Yugoslav Partisans) 206 captured (Ballist claim) (Yugoslav Partisans) 1,500 killed or wounded (British report); In Lojane: (Yugoslav Partisans) 500 killed (Yugoslav Partisans) 117 Captured

The First Battle of Preševo or Battle of Eid al-Fitr took place on Eid al-Fitr, from 18 to 24 September 1944 during World War II, between Yugoslav Partisans and Balli Kombëtar forces, in the territory of the Kingdom of Bulgaria. The battle is usually described as one of the largest during the entire Ballist movement in Kosovo and the surrounding area.

== Prelude ==
From 28 August 1944 to 7 September 1944, a battle was fought near Preševo between Ballist and Bulgarian forces. The battle ended with an Albanian victory due to the capitulation and withdrawal of Bulgarian forces on 9 September 1944. After the capitulation of Italy on September 8, 1943, new circumstances arose for activities aimed at uniting Albanian inhabited territories with the newly German-occupied Albania. For this purpose, from 16 to 20 September 1943, the Second League of Prizren was formed in Prizren, representing all Albanian lands, including those under German and Bulgarian administration. After the capitulation of fascist Bulgaria on September 9, 1944, Albanian Ballist forces in Karadak occupied and de facto annexed the territory previously belonging to the fascist Bulgarian state (Preševo, Bujanovac, Skopje, Kumanovo) with the state of Albania. These forces were mainly from Karadak and were led by commanders such as Jusuf Baftjari, Xheladin Kurbalia, Limon Staneci, Ibrahim Kelmendi, Sylë Hotla etc.

== Battle ==
=== Presevo ===
On 19 September 1944, Yugoslav partisans attacked Ballist positions in the Preševo Valley, with the goal of capturing the town of Preševo, which would have given them a free way to capture the city of Gjilan. In the early hours of the battle, the partisans managed to take control over several villages including Rajince, Crnotince and Oraovica. However, soon after, local Kachaks from the Karadak of Kosovo began to storm the Preševo Valley and mounted a counter-attack, recapturing all of the lost territory. After that, the Kachaks pushed the Yugoslav partisans into a field near the village of Žujince, there they surrounded them and started to attack them with machine gun fire, ultimately killing 49. During the battle over 100 partisans were killed, while 206 were taken prisoners of war. A British report, however, indicated that Ballists overran the 17th Macedonian Brigade near Preševo, resulting in the deaths of 1,500 Partisan soldiers. Hysen Tërpeza, a leader of the Second League of Prizren, noted that inhabitants from Preševo had also joined the battle and had armed themselves with rifles, knives, and axes. He also mentioned that there had been heavy casualties among the Albanian forces defending the town.

=== Lojane ===
The German Wehrmacht of Heeresgruppe E and Albanian Ballists aligned with the Germans, under the command of Mulla Sadik Haliti, were positioned near the Lojane mine when Partisan units attacked them early in the morning of 18 September 1944. The German soldiers took shelter in bunkers and successfully defended their positions. The Partisans simultaneously attacked the civilian populations of Lojane and Vaksince. The Germans and Ballists managed to drive the Partisans back to the village of Nikuljane in Kumanovo. The Ballists continued to pursue the Partisans, further driving them back. Additionally, residents of Sopot, from various ambushes during the Partisan retreat, managed to kill many Partisan forces. For this reason, the Partisans later took revenge on the village of Sopot by killing many civilians from that village. On 24 September, the Partisan forces of the VIII and XII Brigades, suffering heavy losses, retreated from the battlefield, leaving around 500 dead and 117 captured.

== Aftermath ==
After the battle, Mulla Idriz Gjilani, Ramiz Cërnica, Fazli Seferi, and Hysen Tërpeza joined forces, and the group swelled to around 4,000 men. However, upon arrival, they learned that the fighting had already ended. Following the Partisan defeat, the Yugoslav partisans launched air raids and distributed leaflets urging people to join the communists. The Yugoslav partisans, led by Abdullah Krašnica, spent two months preparing another assault to take control of Preševo. Finally, from 9 - 15 November 1944, they engaged in battle and successfully forced the Ballist forces to withdraw into the wider Karadak Mountains, enabling the partisans to capture the town and the surrounding region. This victory granted the partisans an unobstructed path to seize Gjilan. Tahir Zaimi of the Second League of Prizren wrote in his book that after the fall of Preševo, the "Bulgarians and Serbian-Macedonian Partisans" shot between 500 and 600 Albanians.

== Sources ==
- Pirraku, Muhamet (1995). Mulla Idris Gjilani dhe mbrojtja kombëtare e Kosovës Lindore: 1941-1951 (in Albanian). "Dituria Islame" redaksia e botimeve historike.
- Kelmendi, Ibrahim (2006). Një shtyllë e Kosovës quhet Preshevë (in Albanian). Preševo.
- Selmani, Aliriza (2011), Gjithkund ne Kosove solemnisht u kremtua festa e Fiter - Bajramit (in Albanian), Dituria Islame
