= Sulë Hotla =

Albanian military leader (1875–1947)

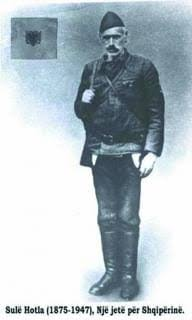
- Born: 1875; Otlja, Kumanovo, Ottoman Empire, (Today: North Macedonia)
- Died: 11 October 1947 (aged 71–72)
- Military career
- Allegiance: Bulgaria (1916-1918); Italian protectorate of Albania; Albania (German client); Second League of Prizren
- Branch: Internal Macedonian Revolutionary Organization; Balli Kombëtar; Kachak
- Service years: 1916–1947
- Rank: Commander
- Conflicts: First Balkan War; Karadak Uprising; Battle of Kumanovo; World War I; Macedonian front; World War II in Yugoslavia; First Battle of Preševo; Kosovo Operation (1944); Kumanovo operation

Sulë Hotla (born Sulejman Asip Sulejmani; 1875 – 11 October 1947), was an Albanian rebel, Internal Macedonian Revolutionary Organization member and a military leader of Balli Kombëtar, who led the Karadak-Gollak Uprising against Yugoslav and Macedonian Partisans in the Kumanovo Karadak region.

== Biography ==
=== Early years ===
Sulë Hotla was born in 1875, in the village of Otlja in the Kaza of Kumanovo of the Ottoman Empire.

=== First Balkan War ===
During the First Balkan War, Hotla fought alongside Idriz Seferi in his Uprising in Karadak and in the Battle of Kumanovo against Serbian forces.

=== World War I ===
In 1916, during the Bulgarian occupation of Kumanovo during the First World War, he joined the VMRO detachment, led by Krastyo Lazarov, to protect the Albanian population from Serbian Chetnik formations.

=== Yugoslavia (1922–1941) ===
After the end of the war, Vardar Macedonia was returned to Serbia and in 1922 Hotla again became a Kachak for about half a year in Karadak, until he was caught by the authorities and imprisoned in Kumanovo. After his release from prison in 1927, he was elected mayor of Matejče municipality, which includes most of the villages of the Kumanovo Karadak, from there remained in office until the defeat of the Kingdom of Yugoslavia in the April War in 1941.

=== Bulgarian rule (1941–1944) ===
During the Bulgarian rule in Macedonia, the Bulgarian authorities appointed him as the chief of the police department in Matejce. Again, under the leadership of Krastjo Lazarov, Hotla with other volunteers from Karadak helped the Bulgarians, fight the communist serb partisans in the area. Sulë Hotla together with Mullah Dula from Otlja maintained relations with other Ballist leaders in Karadak, Kosovo and Albania, such as Xhem Gostivari, Mefail Zayazi, Mullah Idriz Gjilani. In 1944 He joined the Karadak-Gollak Uprising of Mullah Idriz Gjilani. He also worked closely with the military forces of the Second League of Prizren, led by Xhafer Deva.

=== In Communist Yugoslavia (1944–1947) ===
After the withdrawal of the Bulgarian units from Vardar Macedonia on September 7, 1944, Hotla took control over most of Karadak, raised the Albanian flag and proclaimed it a Free Zone. A large meeting of Albanian nationalist leaders was held in Sharr, which was attended by Hotla, as well as Xhem Gostivari, Gajur Derala, Mullah Idriz Gjilani and others. At the meeting, it was decided to create a volunteer army for the defense of Albanian lands. Xhem Gostivari was elected commander of the Balli Kombëtar forces in Sharr, while Hotla was appointed as the commander in Karadak.

During the Kumanovo Operation Hotla's units took part in the battles for Skopje. From September to mid-November, the Albanian forces, numbering about 3,600 soldiers, managed to repel all military attacks of the 16th and 17th brigades of the Kumanovo Partisan Division. In the second half of November and December 1944, the communist units managed to push the Ballist Forces out of Karadak.

Sulë Hotla was captured by the Yugoslav secret service, while trying to cross into Greece. He was executed on 11 October 1947. All his properties in Otlja, Lopate and Nikushtak were confiscated.
