= Battles of Kika and Velegllava =

- Part of World War II in Yugoslavia and the Insurgency in Karadak–Gollak
Date	First battle: 28–29 June 1944; Second battle: 26–27 July 1944
Location	Kika Mountain, Gollak, Albania (modern-day Kosovo)
Result	Balli Kombëtar victory

Belligerents
Balli Kombetar; Support: (Nazi Germany) Germany	Yugoslav Partisans

Commanders and leaders
Mulla Idriz Gjilani; Limon Staneci; Abdi Gjoka †; Bajram Poliça †; Nazim Budrika; Islam Shahiqi †	(Yugoslav Partisans) Unknown

Units involved
Ballists from Gollak	First battle: (Yugoslav Partisans) Partisans; 22nd Division; Second battle: (Yugoslav Partisans) Partisans; 21st Division; 22nd Division; 24th Division; 25th Division

Strength
First battle: 300–400 soldiers Second battle: unknown	First battle: (Yugoslav Partisans) 500–600 soldiers Second battle: (Yugoslav Partisans) 3,000–3,500 soldiers

Casualties and losses
First battle: 17 killed Second battle: 34 killed Total: 51 killed	First battle: (Yugoslav Partisans) 200 killed (Yugoslav Partisans) 131 POW; Second battle: (Yugoslav Partisans) 143 killed (Yugoslav Partisans) 209 wounded Total: (Yugoslav Partisans) 344 killed (Yugoslav Partisans) 340 POW

The Battles of Kika and Velegllava were fought first on 28 June 1944 and later again on 26 July 1944, during World War II, between Yugoslav Partisans and Balli Kombëtar forces, in the territory of German occupied Albania.

== First Battle ==
The first Offensive by the Yugoslav forces of the 22nd Division, aimed at the Velegllava height of Kika Mountain in the Gollak region, occurred on June 28, 1944. A group of 500-600 men, mobilized from Toplica, Vranje, and Leskovac, launched an offensive towards Kika However, they encountered fierce resistance from Balli Kombëtar units. During the 12-hour-long fight, which continued into June 29, 1944, the Yugoslav partisans were defeated with significant losses. In the first battle, the Yugoslav Partisans suffered heavy losses, with 200 killed and 131 taken as Prisoners of War. The Ballist forces also faced losses, with 17 killed, including 2 officers, and many injured. On the Ballist side several Commanders such as Abdi Gjoka from Mati, Bajram Poliçka, and others were killed in the first battle.

== Second Battle ==
During the night between July 25 and 26, Yugoslav Partisans of the 21st, 22nd, 24th, and 25th divisions, with new military reinforcements of about 3,000-3,500 soldiers, launched a wide-scale offensive on a 20 km front with the goal of capturing Gjilan. The Yugoslav partisans attacked Kika Mountain once more, and the second battle again concluded with a Ballist victory. The Partisans suffered 143 killed and 209 wounded, while on the Albanian side, 34 Ballists were killed. Among the dead was one of the Ballist commanders, Islam Shahiqi.
