= List of people from Tetovo =

Below is a list of notable people born in Tetovo, North Macedonia or its surroundings:

== Historical figures ==
- Mehmet Akif Pasha, statesman and governor of the Ottoman Empire
- Hafëz Jusuf Azemi, Balli Kombetar and Albanian rights activist in exile
- Mara Buneva, revolutionary, member of the Internal Macedonian Revolutionary Organization
- Dervish Cara, revolutionary leader known for his role in the Uprising of Dervish Cara
- Gajur Deralla, military captain of Balli Kombetar
- Mehmet Pashë Deralla, signatory of the Albanian Declaration of Independence; Minister of War in the Provisional Government of Albania
- Hayrullah Fişek, General in the Ottoman army, Undersecretary of State, Ministry of National Defence
- Mehmet Gega, teacher and Albanian rights activist
- Nevzat Halili, teacher and Albanian rights activist
- Rexhep Jusufi, military captain of Balli Kombetar
- Sabri Kalkandelen, poet
- Todor Skalovski, composer of the Macedonian national anthem
- Xhafer Sylejmani, doctor and mayor of Tetovo
- Tajar Tetova, military commander and activist of the Albanian national awakening
- Jefrem Janković Tetovac, Orthodox bishop

== Sports figures ==
=== Footballers ===
Note: Only players that have been capped at international level

- Xhelil Abdulla, Footballer
- Nedim Bajrami, Footballer
- Buran Beadini, footballer
- Naser Beadini, footballer
- Egzon Bejtullai, footballer
- Argjend Beqiri, former football player; assistant coach of the Macedonia national football team
- Boško Đurovski, former football player
- Milko Đurovski, former football player
- Blerim Džemaili, Swiss football player
- Vulnet Emini, footballer
- Bajram Fetai, footballer
- Ferhan Hasani, Macedonian football player; best player in the Prva Liga in 2011
- Agim Ibraimi, football player; Macedonian Footballer of the Year in 2012
- Harun Isa, footballer
- Ismail Ismaili, footballer
- Mevlan Murati, footballer
- Nebi Mustafi, footballer
- Valmir Nafiu, football player
- Emran Ramadani, footballer
- Shaqir Rexhepi, footballer

=== Other Sports ===
- Dardan Dehari, ski racer
- Lina Gjorcheska, tennis player
- Dusko (Dan) Markovic, ranked 4th in 1986 World's Strongest Man

== Politicians ==
- Abdylaqim Ademi, Minister of Environment and Physical Planning of North Macedonia
- Teuta Arifi, mayor of Tetovo
- Fatmir Besimi, Deputy Prime Minister in charge of European Integration of North Macedonia
- Ljube Boškoski, former Interior Minister of Macedonia
- Alajdin Demiri, former mayor; Albanian rights activist
- Antonio Milošoski, foreign minister of North Macedonia
- Agim Nuhiu, interior Minister of North Macedonia
- Menduh Thaçi, former leader of Democratic Party of Albanians
- Arben Xhaferi, politician, advocated for the rights of ethnic Albanians in North Macedonia

== Arts ==
- Shpat Kasapi, singer
- Goran Stolevski, cinematographer
- Apostol Trpeski, cinematographer
