= Qazaxlar =

Qazaxlar or Kazakhlar or Kazakhyar may refer to:

- Birinci Qazaxlar, Barda, Azerbaijan (formerly called Qazaxlar)
- Qazaxlar, Fizuli, Azerbaijan
- Qazaxlar, Goranboy, Azerbaijan
