= Neziri =

Neziri is a Persian surname that may refer to the following people:

- Arif Neziri known as Arif Hiqmeti (c. 1870s–1916), leader of a peasant Revolt in Albania
- Behar Neziri (born 2003), Kosovan footballer
- Bojan Neziri (born 1982), Serbian football defender
- Inis Neziri (born 2001), Albanian singer
- Kaltrina Neziri, Kosovar model and beauty pageant titleholder
- Medjit Neziri (born 1990), Macedonian football defender
- Mërgim Neziri (born 1993), German–Albanian footballer
- Nooralotta Neziri (born 1992), Finnish hurdler

== See also ==
- Nezir, people with the given name
- Nəzirli, a village and municipality in the Barda Rayon of Azerbaijan
