= Borsunlu =

Borsunlu or Borsunly may refer to:

- Borsunlu, Goranboy, Azerbaijan
- Borsunlu, Tartar, Azerbaijan
