= Nezir =

Nezir is a Turkish masculine given name or surname. It may refer to:

== Given name ==
- Nezir Karap (born 1994), Turkish swimmer
- Nezir Sağır (born 1983), Turkish weightlifter
- Nezir Škaljić (1844–1905), Bosnian politician and Mayor of Sarajevo

== Surname ==
- İsmail Nezir (born 2003), Turkish hurdler and sprinter

== See also ==
- Neziri, people with the surname
- Nəzirli, a village and municipality in the Barda Rayon of Azerbaijan.
