= Xheladin Kurbaliu =

Albanian resistance leader

- Born: 1907; Kurbalija, Preševo, Ottoman Empire
- Died: February 1946 (aged 38–39); Muçibabë, Gjilan
- Military career
- Allegiance: Yugoslav Partisans (until 1942), Albania (German client)
- Branch: Balli Kombëtar
- Service years: 1942–1946
- Conflicts: Insurgency in Karadak–Gollak: Battle of the Lojane Mine; First Battle of Preševo

Xheladin Kurbaliu, was an Albanian Communist, later turned Fascist and Ballist, who led forces as a commander during the Insurgency in Karadak in World War II. He is best known for his role in the Battle of the Lojane Mine and the First Battle of Preševo.

== Life ==
Xheladin Miftari, better known as Xheladin Kurbaliu, was born in 1907, in the village of Kurbalija in the Karadak region of Preševo. After World War I, due to economic hardships, his family moved to Preševo, where he worked in the chrome mine in the village of Lojane, Kumanovo.

Following the April War and the subsequent occupation of the Kingdom of Yugoslavia in 1941 by Axis forces and the division of occupation zones, Preševo fell under the rule of fascist Bulgaria. Kurbaliu openly opposed Bulgarian rule and advocated for the unification of all Albanian ethnic territories with Albania, including Preševo and its surrounding areas. Due to his political stance, he was forced to leave Preševo and continue his activities in Gjilan, where conditions for patriotic work were more favorable, as Gjilan was in the Italian-occupied zone, which had been integrated into the Albanian state.

With the formation of the First Albanian Partisan Brigade of Kosovo, "Zenel Hajdini," in Ramjan of Viti on September 27, 1942, Kurbaliu was appointed its first commander. While preparing for an operation at the Llojan chrome mine on October 21, 1942, alongside part of the Vraja Brigade commanded by Živojin Nikolić Brka, Kurbaliu disagreed with the appointment of a Serbian commander to lead the Staff, a decision which was accepted by other members such as Fadil Hoxha and Sinan Hasani. This marked the beginning of his conflict with the political line of the League of Communists of Yugoslavia. He lost hope in the Partisan movement, when even the Albanian leadership of the "Zenel Hajdini" Brigade, including Fadil Hoxha, Sinan Hasani and Kurtesh Agushi, opposed his stance.

Following the battle at the Lojane Mine, Kurbaliu left the Partisan Movement and gave up on his communist ideas, taking refuge for a time in the Kulla of Kufca e Poshtme, before ultimately becoming a fascist and joining Balli Kombëtar. For this, he was labeled a traitor by Albanian communists. After the capitulation of fascist Bulgaria in September 1944, Kurbaliu, along with other Albanian nationalist leaders in the Karadak, organized the defense of ethnic borders against incursions by Serbian, Macedonian, and Montenegrin partisan units. Once Bulgarian forces withdrew from Preševo, Kurbaliu ordered the raising of the Albanian flag at the Preševo Mosque. When Serbian-Bulgarian and Macedonian partisan units advanced into Gjilan, Kurbaliu openly opposed the re-establishment of Yugoslav rule and fought the Yugoslav Partisans. Following the end of World War II, he continued fighting Yugoslav rule until he was killed, along with three comrades, by OZNA collaborators in February 1946, in the village of Muçibabë in Karadak.

== Legacy ==
A street in Pristina is named after Xheladin Kurbaliu.
