= Rexhep Jusufi =

Albanian military captain (d. 1943)

Captain

Personal details
- Born: Kalkandelen, Ottoman Empire
- Died: 1943 Bukovici
- Occupation: Soldier

Military service
- Allegiance: Balli Kombëtar

Rexhep Jusufi was a captain of the Ballist Luboten Battalion in Vardar Macedonia.

== Biography ==
=== Early life ===
Deralla was born in Kalkandelen, Ottoman Empire (present day Tetovo, North Macedonia). Jusufi studied at Rome and Padua before returning to Tetovo to join the Luboten Battalion.

=== Luboten Battalion ===
When the Luboten Battalion was incorporated into the Balli Kombëtar, Jusufi joined the battalion as a captain and fought alongside Gajur Deralla. The battalion was successful against the Yugoslav partisans in Tetovo as Tetovo had the largest Balli Kombëtar base in Macedonia.

=== Death ===
At the end of 1943, Rexhep Jusufi went along with Gajur Deralla and the Luboten division to Kicevo to help the Balli Kombëtar forces of Mefail Shehu against the Yugoslav partisans. En route to Kičevo, partisan forces organised an ambush at Bukovici. Jusufi fell into the ambush at Bukovici which resulted in his death.
