= Battle of Prapashticë =

Battle during World War II in Kosovo

- Part of the Insurgency in Karadak-Gollak and the Kosovo Operation.
| Date | 15–21 October 1944 |
| Location | Prapashticë, Pristina |
| Result | Albanian victory: Bulgarian forces fail to penetrate into Pristina |

Belligerents
| Balli Kombëtar; Second League of Prizren | Bulgaria |

Commanders and leaders
| Mulla Idriz Gjilani; Ramiz Cërnica; Shyt Mareci; Isak Domi; Shefqet Bullykbashi; Mulla Sefë Govori; Nazmi Budrika | Vladimir Stoychev; Kiril Stanchev |

Units involved
| 4th Regiment; Local volunteers | 2nd Bulgarian Army |

Strength
| 20,000 troops stationed on the Ceraja-Kumanovo frontline | 2 brigades |

Casualties and losses
| 60 killed | 600 killed 12 cannons destroyed 1 machine gun seized 1 mortar seized Hundreds of rifles seized 60 draft animals lost |

The Battle of Prapashticë was a battle that occurred between 15 and 21 October 1944, during the Insurgency in Karadak-Gollak and the Kosovo Operation. The battle occurred between the forces of Balli Kombëtar and the Second League of Prizren against the Bulgarian army. The battle culminated in a victory for the Albanian rebel groups, as the Bulgarian army failed to reach Pristina and was forced to retreat.

== Background ==
After the capitulation of Fascist Italy in Albania during 1943, Kosovar Albanians formed the Second League of Prizren, where the prime minister and leader would be Bedri Pejani. In February 1944, with the request of Pejani, Hitler agreed to the formation of the 21st Waffen Mountain Division of the SS Skanderbeg which fought in several battles against Yugoslav Partisans however they failed in most operations.

The village of Prapashticë had played an important role in the Insurgency in Karadak-Gollak, with it being the site of several key battles during the conflict, including a battle on 19 March 1944, as well as several attacks during May–June in the villages of Galab, Brainë, Prapashticë and Hajkobillë.

On 8 September Bulgaria declared war against Nazi Germany. After the Niš operation the Bulgarians began a campaign in the region of Anamorava, in eastern Kosovo attacking Albanian and German soldiers. The campaign resulted in the capture of several towns in Anamorava. To combat the Bulgarian and Yugoslav expansion, Albanian forces formed a frontline that stretched from the village of Ceraja, Vushtrri to Kumanovo and held 20,000 troops which were divided into 6 battalions led by Shashivar Aliu from Mitrovica.

== Battle ==
On 15 October 1944, two brigades of the 2nd Bulgarian Army began attacking the ballist frontlines in the villages near Pristina with the goal of penetrating and capturing the town. The Bulgarians engaged with the 4th regiment of Balli Kombëtar in the village of Prapashticë. The ballist army also included local volunteers and soldiers from the Second League of Prizren. The forces of Prapashticë were commanded by several "well known" Ballist generals, including Isak Domi, Mulla Idriz Gjilani, Mulla Sefë Govori, Nazmi Budrika, Shefqet Bullykbashi as well as several other generals from Gollak.

The fighting began on the 15th of October, when the Bulgarians armed with cannons attacked the Albanian positions. The harsh terrain filled with hills made it difficult for the Bulgarian forces to advance against the Ballist forces, which ultimately led to their defeat. The Bulgarian forces began regrouping and attacked the village for a second time on 18 October. The ballist which had called reinforcements resisted the Bulgarian forces for three days before mounting a counterattack against the Bulgarians. The counterattack led to the retreat of the Bulgarian forces, which suffered heavy casualties and lost large amounts of equipment, which was seized by the Ballists.

The ballists suffered 60 deaths, while the Bulgarians suffered 600 deaths and lost 12 cannons. Albanian forces also seized a machine gun and a mortar, and also captured hundreds of rifles. The Bulgarians also lost 60 draft animals.

== Aftermath ==
Despite the Albanian victory in Prapashtica, the Bulgarian offensive in Karadak and Gollak continued. Between 25 and 27 October the Bulgarian forces captured the villages of Tabanovce, Staro Nagoričane, Novo Nagoričane, Žujince, Moravica and Bukarevac. Despite heavy Albanian resistance, by the end of October most of the villages near Pristina were captured, while the city fell on 19 November.
