= Prapashticë =

- Village
- Location in Kosovo
- Coordinates: 42.7258°N 21.3833°E
- Country: Kosovo
- District: Pristina
- Municipality: Pristina

Population (2024)
  - Total: 135
- Time zone: UTC+1 (CET)
  - Summer (DST): UTC+2 (CEST)

Prapashticë or Propaštica is a village in the municipality of Pristina, Kosovo. The village is located on the eastern border between Kosovo and Serbia. The neighboring village on the Serbian side is Medevce part of the municipality of Medvegja.

== History ==
=== World War II ===
During the Insurgency in Karadak–Gollak Bulgarian and Yugoslav forces attacked the village of Prapashticë several times. Prapashticë and its region played an important role in the Albanian defense of Pristina, with the regions hilly terrain making it difficult for invaders. The most notable battle occurred between 15–21 October 1944 when an Albanian army defeated two brigades of the Bulgarian army, killing 600 Bulgarian soldiers.

=== Kosovo War ===
During the Kosovo War, Prapashticë was the sight of an ambush that occurred on 24 March 1999, when Yugoslav forces ambushed and killed the KLA commander of logistics of the 153rd Brigade, Ismet Asllani, who himself was from the village.

== Notable people ==
- Isa Mustafa, politician, former Mayor of Pristina, former Prime Minister of Kosovo
- Ismet Asllani, commander of Kosovo Liberation Army, businessman and humanitarian
