= Zajas =

Zajas Зајас Zajaz
- Village
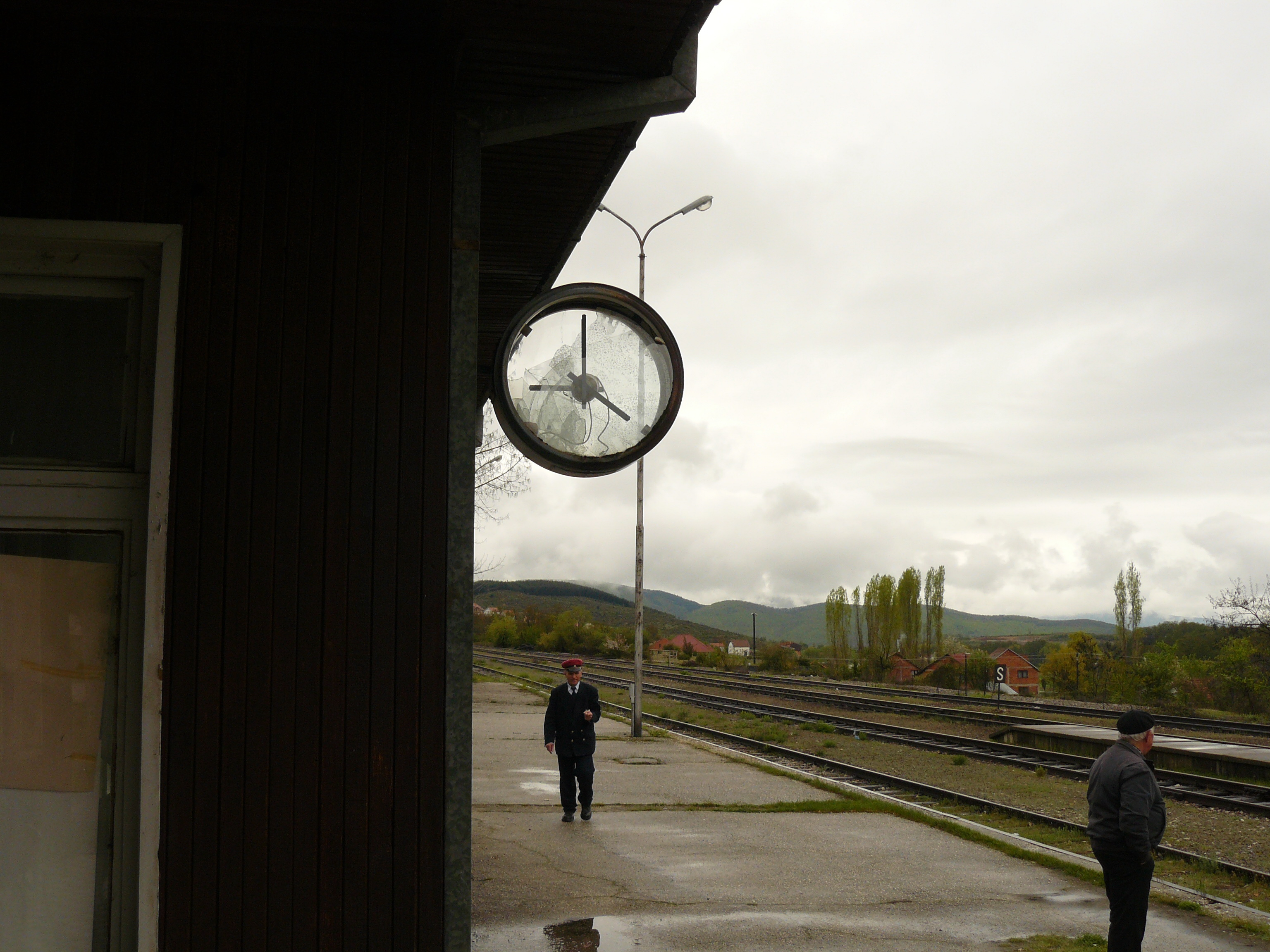
- Train station in Zajas

- Location within North Macedonia
- Coordinates: 41°36′N 20°56′E
- Country: North Macedonia
- Region: Southwestern
- Municipality: Kičevo

Population (2021)
  - Total: 2,567
- Time zone: UTC+1 (CET)
  - Summer (DST): UTC+2 (CEST)
- Car plates: KI
- Website: .

Zajas (Macedonian: Зајас, Albanian: Zajaz) is a village in the municipality of Kičevo, North Macedonia. Zajas was the seat of the Zajas Municipality, and is now in Kičevo Municipality.

== History ==
=== Ottoman ===
The village is attested in the 1467/68 Ottoman tax registry (defter) for the Nahiyah of Kırçova. The village had a total of 73 houses, excluding bachelors (mucerred).

In statistics gathered by Vasil Kanchov in 1900, the village of Zajas was inhabited by 2150 Muslim Albanians.

During the Albanian revolt of 1912, Zajas was the political and organizational center of the insurgent-revolutionary movement for the Kaza of Kičevo. In Zajas, a Committee / Headquarter of the uprising was set up, with the village serving as the meeting place of the Albanian troops, where they received concrete instructions and tasks in order to coordinate their political and revolutionary activity.

The village was burned by Chetnik forces and members of the Serbian army during the Balkan Wars.

=== Yugoslavia ===
In September 1913, after the Ohrid–Debar uprising, a group of Orthodox Serbs from neighbouring Midinci, under the orders of chetnik Mikajle Brodski, due to their ability to speak the local dialect of Albanian, would dress in Albanian folk dress and parade through Zajas chanting erdhi Shqipëria! (Albania has arrived). This was done with the intent of rounding up the Albanians in one area, which would be the mosque of the Dumaj mahala. The Albanians were instructed to bring one representative from each house in the village. After their arrival, around 300 Albanian men of all ages were executed on the mosque grounds, with around 86 of the bodies being thrown in the nearby well and the rest burned inside a shed. The executions were largely carried out by bayonet, with instances of decapitation also being noted. After the massacre, the remaining Albanians were let go, but would be fired upon after their release, with a number being killed or injured during their flight. A further 56 Albanians had also been massacred near the mill of Veli Xhaka, with their bodies being thrown in the wells of the Xhakallarë mahala. In the immediate aftermath of the massacre, a phenomenon of women stealing and burying the leftover remains of male relatives or family members was noted.

On 6 May 1919 the Committee for the National Defence of Kosovo called for a general uprising in Albanian regions in Yugoslavia. Although the uprising was quelled by the Yugoslav army, confrontations continued through the years 1920 and 1921, 1923. Macedonian Archival sources show that in the first half of 1920, the activities for organizing an anti-Serb uprising among the Albanian committees were strong, with Kalosh Lazam Dani from Zajas being one of the two the main organizers of revolutionary activity in Vardar Macedonia.

The Balli Kombëtar committee held a meeting in Zajas in 1942. Representatives of the Albanian tribes that attended the meeting elected Mefail Shehu as military commander of the region. Shehu's battalion patrolled villages around Zajas. At that period, the Ballist forces successfully repelled the Yugoslav partisans.

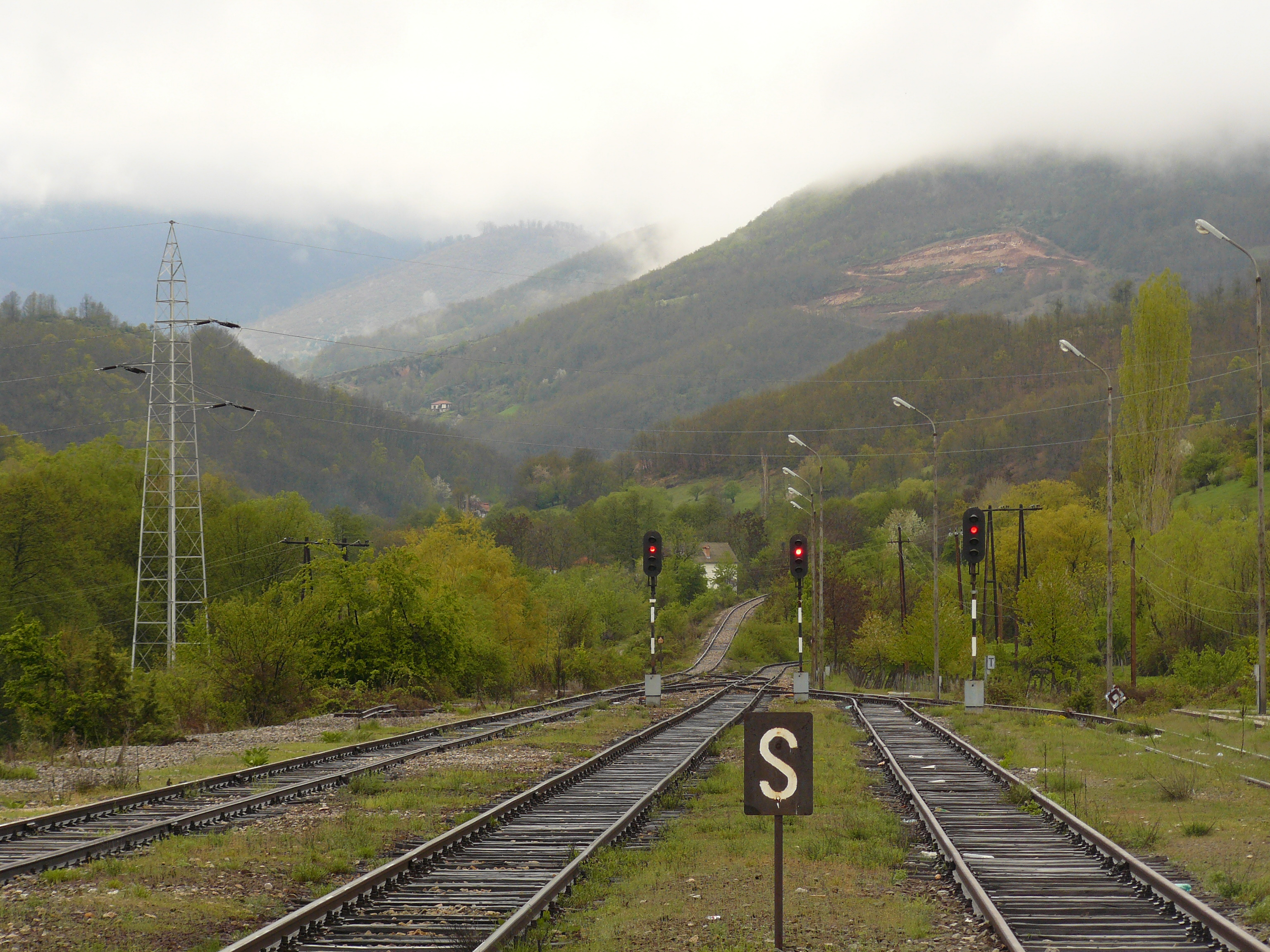
Train tracks in Zajas

In October 1943, a general assembly was called in Zajas, where it was decided that the chairman of the committee of the Balli Kombëtar will be Mefail Shehu, along with Mefail Mehmeti as vice chairman, Begzat Vuli as treasurer and Skender Presevo as under prefect. In the autumn of 1944, the village was captured by communist guerrillas amid a bloody battle. After the battle, the OZNA killed 320 Albanians.

== Demographics ==
As of the 2021 census, Zajas had 2,567 residents with the following ethnic composition:

- Albanians 2,449
- Persons for whom data are taken from administrative sources 117
- Macedonians 1

According to the 2002 census, the village had a total of 4,712 inhabitants. Ethnic groups in the village include:

- Albanians 4,682
- Macedonians 4
- Serbs 4
- Others 22

== Culture ==
Zajas is notable for a distinct style of rudimentary polyphonic singing.

== Sports ==
Local football club KF Zajazi have played in the Macedonian Second League.

== Notable people ==
- Mefail Shehu, National Front (Balli Kombëtar) fighter and leader of the Kičevo region during the Second World War.
- Ali Ahmeti, leader of the National Liberation Army and chairman of the Democratic Union for Integration.
