= Birinci Qazaxlar =

- Municipality
- Location within Azerbaijan Location within Karabakh Economic Region
- Coordinates: 40°25′12″N 47°01′10″E
- Country: Azerbaijan
- Rayon: Barda
- Time zone: UTC+4 (AZT)
  - Summer (DST): UTC+5 (AZT)

Birinci Qazaxlar (known as Qazaxlar until 2015) is a village in the Nəzirli municipality (Şatırlı) of the Barda District of Azerbaijan.
