= Ilirida =

Proposed autonomy within the state of North Macedonia

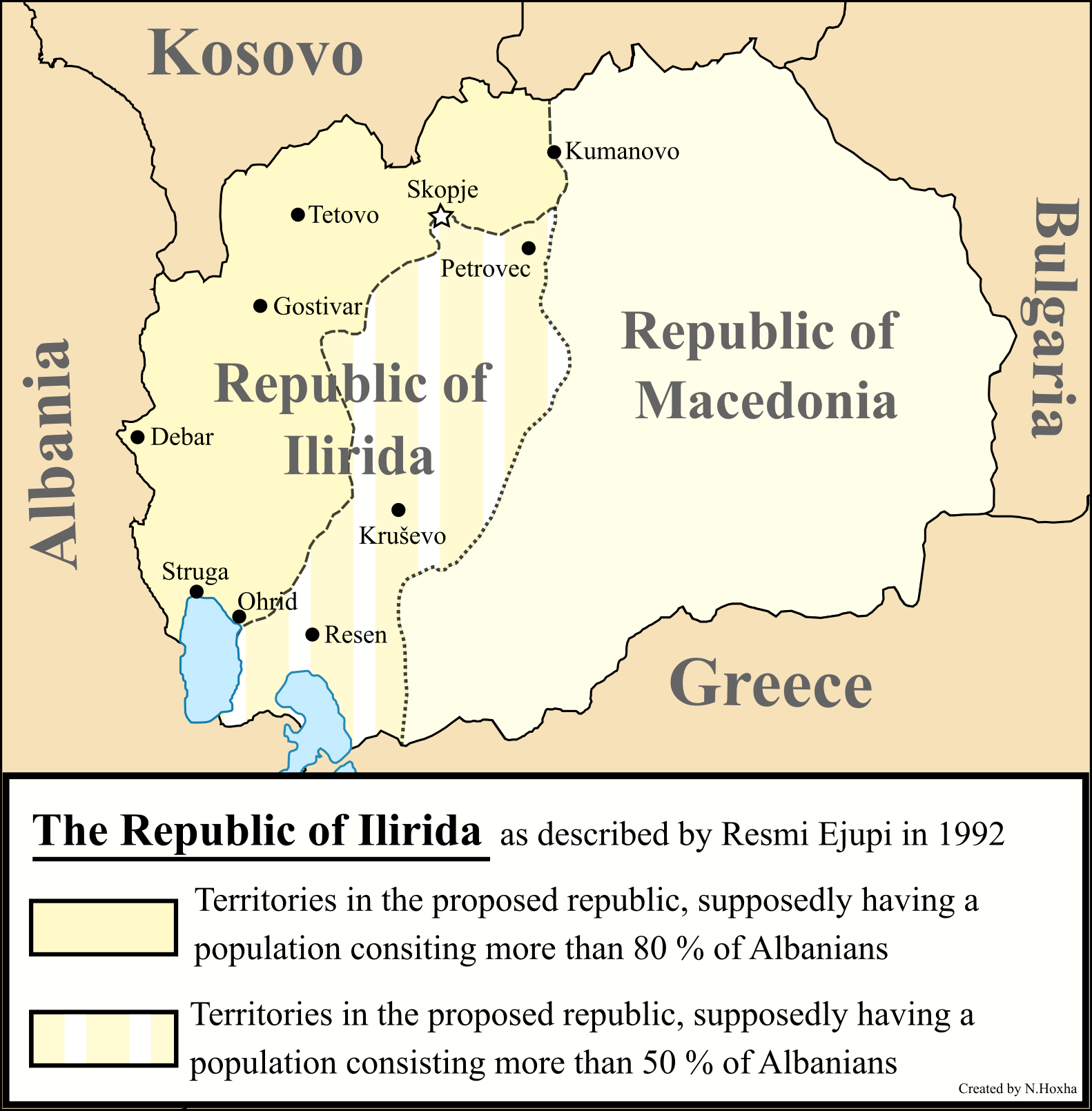
Map of the proposed Republic of Ilirida

Ilirida (Albanian: Ilirida; Macedonian: Илирида, romanized: Ilirida) or the Republic of Ilirida (Albanian: Republika e Iliridës; Macedonian: Република Илирида, romanized: Republika Ilirida) is a proposed state in the western regions of North Macedonia (then Republic of Macedonia), declared twice by the politician Nevzat Halili, once in 1992 and again in 2014. The proposal has been declared unconstitutional by the Macedonian government. The secessionist concept of Ilirida emerged in the early 1990s and was advocated by some Albanian politicians as a solution to concerns and disputes the Albanian community had regarding constitutional recognition and minority rights within Macedonia.

== Etymology ==
The name Ilirida is a portmanteau formed from the words Illyri(a) and Da(rdania), which are the names of ancient regions that covered parts of modern-day North Macedonia.

== History ==
=== Declaration of Republic (1992) ===
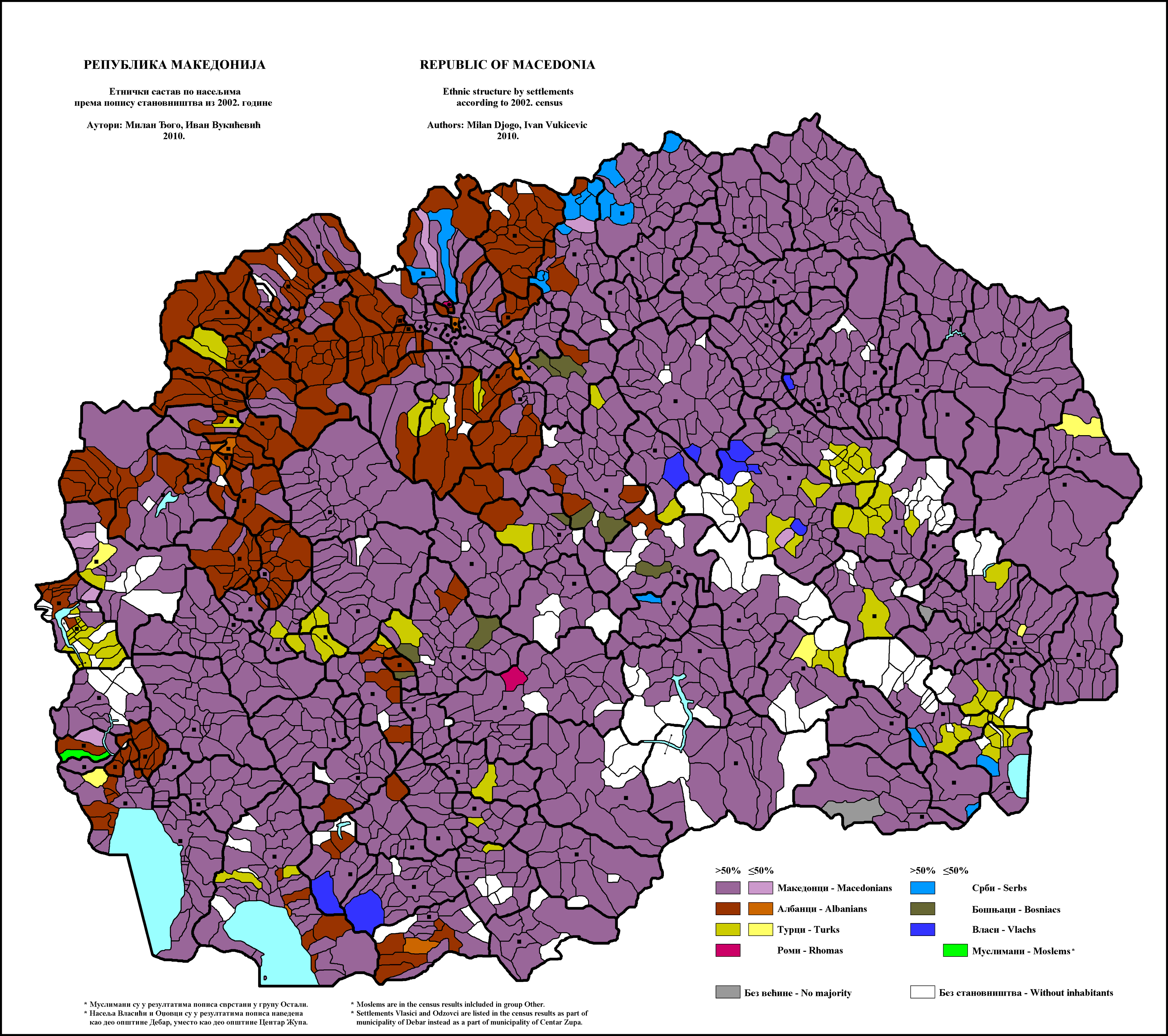
Ethnic groups in the Republic of Macedonia (2002 census), settlements with a majority Albanian population are colored in brown

Following the breakup of Yugoslavia, the position of ethnic Albanians was uncertain in the early years of the new Macedonian republic. Various Albanian political parties emerged, of which the Party for Democratic Prosperity (PDP) was the largest and most prominent. The PDP called for the improvement of the status of Albanians in Macedonia, such as extended education rights and Albanian language usage, constitutional changes, release of political prisoners, proportional voting system and an end to discrimination. Discontent with the lack of constitutional recognition of collective rights for Albanians resulted in PDP leader Nevzat Halili declaring his party would regard the constitution as invalid and move toward seeking autonomy.

Later, a referendum on the status of the Albanians in Macedonia, declared illegal by the Macedonian government, was held in January 1992. 74% out of 92% of those eligible to vote, voted for the autonomy of the Albanians. On March 31, 1992, about 40,000 ethnic Albanians demonstrated in the streets of Skopje, asking that Macedonia remain an unrecognized state until areas with an Albanian majority were autonomous.

On April 6, 1992, the Republic of Ilirida was proclaimed in Struga by Albanian activists, in front of a crowd of 2,500 people. The main organizer being the PDP leader, Nevzat Halili.

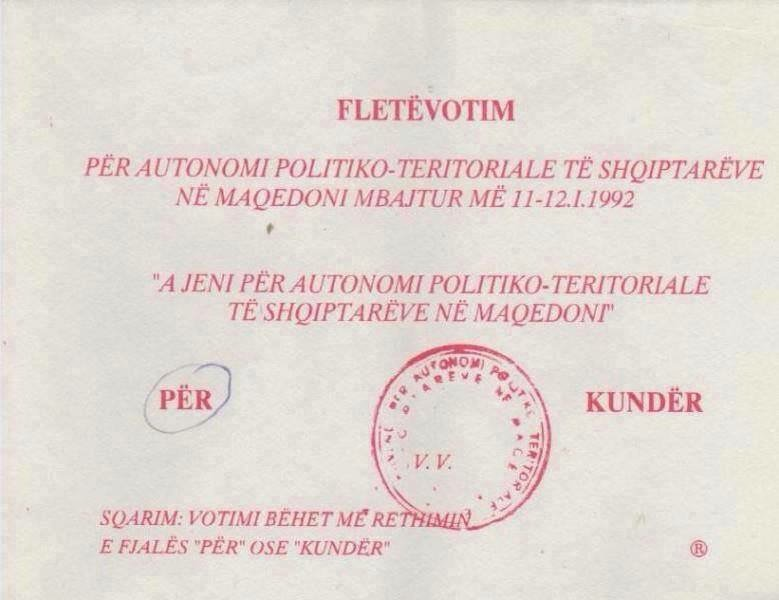
A ballot from the referendum for autonomy of Albanian Macedonians (1992)

The proposed republic would have covered approximately half of Macedonia's territory, mainly where Albanians form large concentrations and majorities in the west and northwest of the country. It intended to unite all Albanians living in Yugoslavia. Later on, the aim of the activists was that of favoring the federalization of Macedonia.

On November 6, 1992, Macedonian police used force to disperse ethnic Albanians who were protesting for the release of a cigarette smuggler. Clashes with police resulted in the deaths of 4 Albanians and 36 injured. The police seized 2,000 leaflets signed by the Ilirida Albanian youth movement, which urged the Albanians of Macedonia to wage war for their rights of self-determination.

Macedonian leadership opposed the demands as they viewed them a "Trojan horse" that could lead to secession and become part of campaign geared toward creating Greater Albania by uniting to Albania other areas in the Balkans.

=== Paramilitary Case (1993–1995) ===
During the period of gaining independence and prior to the Yugoslav army leaving the country, Macedonian President Kiro Gligorov had told ethnic Macedonian and Albanian citizens to create paramilitary forces. The peaceful exit of the Yugoslav army ended official encouragement for the formation of paramilitary forces. At the time, arms had been stockpiled for "communal self-defence". Both of these events would later lead to the discovery of the what became known as the "weapons plot", "arms plot" or "arms scandal" (November 1993) that involved several PDP officials, such as the Deputy Minister of Defence, implicated in what Macedonian media called an "Albanian paramilitary organization".

Macedonian authorities arrested a group of PDP politicians, according to government officials the accused were in possession of 300 machine guns and planned an armed uprising of 20,000 Albanians to create the Republic of Ilirida. An attempt to conciliate Albanian politicians, Gligorov stated that no links existed between the accused and PDP leaders, whereas Albanian leadership called for unity and loyalty to the state. The death in custody of one of the accused heightened tensions. According to governmental sources, there was coordination between the Macedonian Albanian activists, some Kosovo Albanians, and the Republic of Albania. The government of Albania denied those accusations, and so did Ibrahim Rugova, then president of the Republic of Kosova. Albania alleged the plot and previous calls for an Ilirida were a fabrication by FR Yugoslavia. The PDP gave an initial muted reply to events. They stated that weapons were smuggled due to feelings of insecurity held by citizens during the departure of the Yugoslav army, sentiments that had gone with the establishment of a Macedonian army.

In 1993 Halili was tried for “paramilitary” secessionism, but was not jailed. Halili then disappeared from the political scene. During their trial, the other accused PDP members claimed that they acted in self-defence at a time when the Macedonian army had not been formed. The indictment stated that the accused aimed to overthrow the state through a sophisticated paramilitary and communications network based in towns in the north and west of the country. The accused were tried under law from the former Yugoslav period. Initially members in the Macedonian government had told the accused PDP politicians that they would get short sentences ranging to a maximum of 18 months. Later the court in Skopje gave sentences spanning 5 to 8 years to 10 PDP politicians: Abdylselem Arsallani, Mitat Emini, Hasan Agushi, Aqif Demiri, Burim Murtezani, Resmi Ejupi, Hysen Haskaj, Selam Elmazi, Eugen Cami and Shinasi Rexhepi. The Organization for Security and Co-operation in Europe (OSCE) mission to Macedonia noted multiple irregularities with trial proceedings and violations of the defendants rights. During January 1995, two years were removed from the sentences of all 10 men by an appeals court. On August 1, 1995, the men were all released, with 8 only serving a third of their prison time. Both Emini and Agushi received amnesties. Several sources among western militaries placed responsibility for instigating the weapons scandal on Richard Tomlinson, a British Secret Intelligence Service (MI6) operative with links to the PDP leadership in playing an important role, along with British and French Intelligence.

=== Late 20th and early 21st centuries ===
The nationalist faction of the PDP had confronted Halili in September 1993 at the party congress and the leadership was accused of failing "obtain either autonomy or the status of a people of the state". By 1994, the party split and the nationalist faction became the Democratic Party of Albanians (DPA) led by Arben Xhaferi and Menduh Thaçi, whereas a rump PDP was led by Abdurman Haliti. Muhamed Halili, former coordinator of the now split Party for Democratic Prosperity (PDP), declared to a Bulgarian newspaper in 1994 that the party still wanted to achieve autonomy, and that Albanians' autonomy in Macedonia was the "first stage of the two-nation state". The other Albanian leaders kept silent about the issue, but in June 1994 the Albanian National Party (NPD) resolved that "Ilirida autonomy is the minimum which the Albanians of Macedonia should realize", and Abdurahman Haliti, president of the PDP, warned that "those who think that the autonomy option for the Albanians of Macedonia doesn't exist, are wrong".

During the period of the Yugoslav wars (1990s), the international community was resolute in maintaining territorial integrity in the region and it resulted in the softening of demands by Albanian politicians and later of the National Liberation Army (NLA) in the 2001 conflict. A body called Working Group on Ethnic and National Communities and Minorities (1991-1996) was established to deal with the Yugoslav breakup. The working group was successful in mediating a selection of minority demands and it persuaded Albanians not to pursue autonomy in Macedonia after 1992. By the middle of the decade, Albanian political leadership had changed positions from initially seeking autonomy in Macedonia to one of "internal self-determination" for the Albanian minority that denoted cultural autonomy instead of territorial aims.

By 1999 the Albanian Paramilitary of the Republic of Ilirida had been created, and were deemed illegal by the government of Macedonia. They were however tolerated.

By 2001, sentiments for territorial changes were minimal among Albanians in Macedonia during the conflict between the NLA and Macedonian Army. In a nationwide poll commissioned by the US State Department's Office of Research in April/May 2001, a majority (69%) of Albanians sympathised with NLA demands, however most (87%) supported the unity of the country with 71% stating a preference to living in a multiethnic Macedonia as opposed to a Greater Albania.

In 2002, a paramilitary group called the Army of the Republic of Ilirida was created. The goal of the group was to incorporate Western Macedonia into Albania or into Kosovo. Allegedly composed of 200 members, it was rumored that members of the group took an oath to Leka Zogu, claimant of the title of Crown Prince of Albania. However, Leka Zogu denied those claims.

Although the idea of the Republic of Ilirida seemed to have been abandoned by its proponents, on September 18, 2014, a few dozen Albanians assembled in Skopje to again declare the creation of the Republic of Ilirida. According to Nevzat Halili, the self-proclaimed president, the right of Albanians in Macedonia to self-determination and the proclamation of Ilirida as an autonomous region is based on the United States Constitution. Halili threatened to organize a referendum if his plans were ignored by the government. Nationalists in circles of Macedonian and Serbian politics apply the concept of Greater Albania as a scare tactic in bids to rally support.

== See also ==
- Albanians in North Macedonia
- Albanian nationalism (North Macedonia)
- Albania–North Macedonia relations
- List of active separatist movements in Europe

== Notes ==
1. Other spellings of the term are Illyrida and Ilyrida.
