= Ismet Asllani =

Kosovar businessman, humanitarian, and military commander (1955–1999)

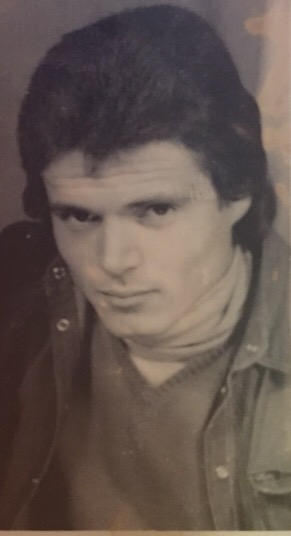
- Ismet Asllani in Lipjan (1988)
- Born: August 18, 1955; Prapashticë, SFR Yugoslavia (now Kosovo)
- Died: 24 March 1999 (aged 43); Prapashticë, Kosovo
- Spouse: Makfire (Maki) Beqiri Asllani
- Children: Alban Asllani (son), Valon Asllani (son), Shqipe Asllani (daughter)
- Relatives: Muharrem Asllani (brother) †, Nazim Asllani (brother) †
- Military career
- Allegiance: Kosova
- Branch: Kosovo Liberation Army
- Rank: Commander of Logistics
- Unit: 153rd Brigade
- Conflicts: Kosovo War
- Awards: Hero of Kosovo (2013)

Ismet Hazir Asllani (August 18, 1955 – March 24, 1999) was an Albanian businessman, humanitarian, and logistics commander of the 153rd Brigade of the Kosovo Liberation Army (KLA) during the Kosovo War. He is known for using his wealth and infrastructure to provide food supplies and logistical support to KLA fighters across the regions of Drenica, Dukagjin, and Llap. In recognition of his contributions to the war effort, he was posthumously awarded the title Hero of Kosovo in 2013 by Kosovan President Atifete Jahjaga. His legacy has been publicly honored by several prominent Kosovan leaders, including President Hashim Thaçi, Speaker of Parliament Kadri Veseli, mayor of Pristina Përparim Rama, and mayor of Lipjan Imri Ahmeti.

== Early life and wartime role ==
Ismet Asllani was born in 1955 in the village of Prapashticë, near Pristina. He became one of the wealthiest private entrepreneurs in Kosovo during the 1990s, owning and operating multiple flour mills across the country. Following the escalation of the conflict, Asllani committed his entire fortune to supporting the Kosovo Liberation Army (KLA).

Through his mills in Lipjan, Kijevë, and Kopernicë, he organized the delivery of food to KLA fighters and civilians in Drenica, Dukagjin, and Llap. According to wartime accounts, he was responsible for providing up to 10 tons of flour per day to war zones, even after his facilities were targeted and destroyed by Serbian forces. He was appointed head of logistics for the 153rd Brigade of the KLA and continued to operate in secrecy while maintaining his economic activities to fund the war effort.

On March 24, 1999, Ismet Asllani was killed by Serbian forces in an ambush near his home village. Less than a month later, on April 19, his two younger brothers, Muharrem and Nazim Asllani, were also killed by Serbian police forces in the village of Hallaç i Vogël.

== Personal life ==
Ismet Asllani’s sons, Alban and Valon Asllani, also joined the KLA during the Kosovo War. After the war, Alban Asllani, a war-disabled veteran, survived a politically motivated assassination attempt in 2009 in Lipjan, which drew significant public attention and support from veterans' associations.

In July 2024, Alban Asllani was appointed Acting President of the Association of War Invalids of the Kosovo Liberation Army (Sh.I.L. të UÇK-së) for the municipality of Prishtina. In this capacity, he pledged to continue defending the rights of veterans and war-disabled fighters.

Ismet Asllani's legacy is also preserved through the writings of his daughter, Shqipe Asllani, who was nine years old when he was killed. As a poet and public speaker, she has dedicated numerous poems and interviews to honoring her father’s memory and sacrifice. In her writings, she describes Ismet not only as a hero, but also as a devoted father and humanitarian who embodied selflessness and patriotism. Her literary work reflects the emotional impact of his loss on his family and the broader symbolism of his life for Kosovo’s national identity.

Ismet Asllani's wife, Makfire (Maki) Beqiri Asllani, has actively preserved his memory and expressed her perspectives on national unity. On Albanian Flag Day (28 November), she conveyed a message to her late husband, questioning the divisions among Albanian territories and emphasizing the continued relevance of his struggle for national cohesion.

== Public statements and media ==
On 3 May 1998, in an interview with the German magazine Der Spiegel, Ismet Asllani reportedly stated: “Ne jemi gati. Kur presidenti ynë të japë sinjalin, atëherë lufta do të fillojë. Kjo jetë nuk u ofron më asgjë fëmijëve tanë.” ("We are ready. When our president gives the signal, the war will begin. This life offers nothing more to our children.").

He is also remembered for saying: “Gjithçka që kemi është e UÇK-së.” ("Everything we have belongs to the KLA"), reflecting his personal commitment to the KLA.

A documentary titled Ismet Asllani – Jetë në shërbim të atdheut (A Life in the Service of the Homeland), produced and broadcast by RTK1, is available on YouTube and features accounts from his family and fellow fighters.

In August 2025, the Albanian-language documentary channel Histori Epike released a tribute titled Biznesmeni që i fali pasurinë e jetën UÇK‑së, dedicated to the life and legacy of Ismet Asllani. The film includes interviews with family members, former KLA commanders, and community figures, and portrays Asllani not only as a logistical leader but as a moral exemplar whose selflessness inspired many people. The episode affirms his standing among the most revered figures in Kosovo’s national memory.

== Legacy and honors ==
On the anniversary of Ismet Asllani’s death, the Mayor of Pristina, Përparim Rama, paid tribute to him. In a public statement, Rama described Asllani as a key figure in the fight for Kosovo’s independence, highlighting his role as logistics commander of the 153rd Brigade of the KLA. He stated that Asllani's life and actions stand as a "testament to the highest form of sacrifice for the nation". Rama also expressed gratitude to the Asllani family for their contributions.

On the same occasion, the Mayor of Lipjan, Imri Ahmeti, together with the Association of KLA Martyrs' Families and former comrades, laid wreaths at the site of Asllani’s death, commemorating his sacrifice and legacy.

On June 14, 2018, a statue of Ismet Asllani was officially unveiled in the city park of Lipjan to mark the municipality's Liberation Day. The ceremony was attended by municipal leaders, veterans of the Kosovo Liberation Army, and members of the Asllani family. In his address, Lipjan’s Mayor Imri Ahmeti stated that “history and his deeds speak best for him,” highlighting Asllani’s selfless sacrifice and enduring legacy. The statue was presented as a permanent tribute to his role in Kosovo’s liberation and as a symbol of pride for Lipjan and the broader nation.

In June 2020, the President of Kosovo, Hashim Thaçi, visited the family of Ismet Asllani in Lipjan to pay tribute to him. Thaçi described Asllani as a symbol of sacrifice and a key pillar of the KLA’s logistical infrastructure. He also commended the broader Asllani family for their contributions to the war effort.

Former Speaker of Parliament and KLA commander Kadri Veseli also praised Asllani’s contribution, stating that "the life and work of Ismet Asllani will remain unforgettable," and that his dedication to the national cause was complete and exemplary.

In 2013, Asllani was posthumously awarded the title of "Hero of Kosovo" by President Atifete Jahjaga.
