= Nevzat Halili =

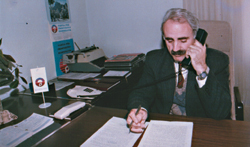
- Born: September 15, 1946 (age 79); Poroj, PR Macedonia, FPR Yugoslavia
- Occupation: Teacher
- Known for: Albanian rights activist Organizer of the Republic of Ilirida movement

Nevzat Halili (born September 15, 1946), is a Macedonian politician and teacher of English. Halili was first elected to the Macedonian parliament in 1991 and is a member of the Party for Democratic Prosperity. He served as a minister the second government of Branko Crvenkovski (1994-1998).

In January 1992, the Republic of Ilirida, a territorial entity, was self-proclaimed by Nevzat Halili and other Albanian activists in Struga.
