= Mehmet Pashë Deralla =

Ottoman-Albanian military officer and revolutionary (1843–1918)

Mehmet Derralla Pasha
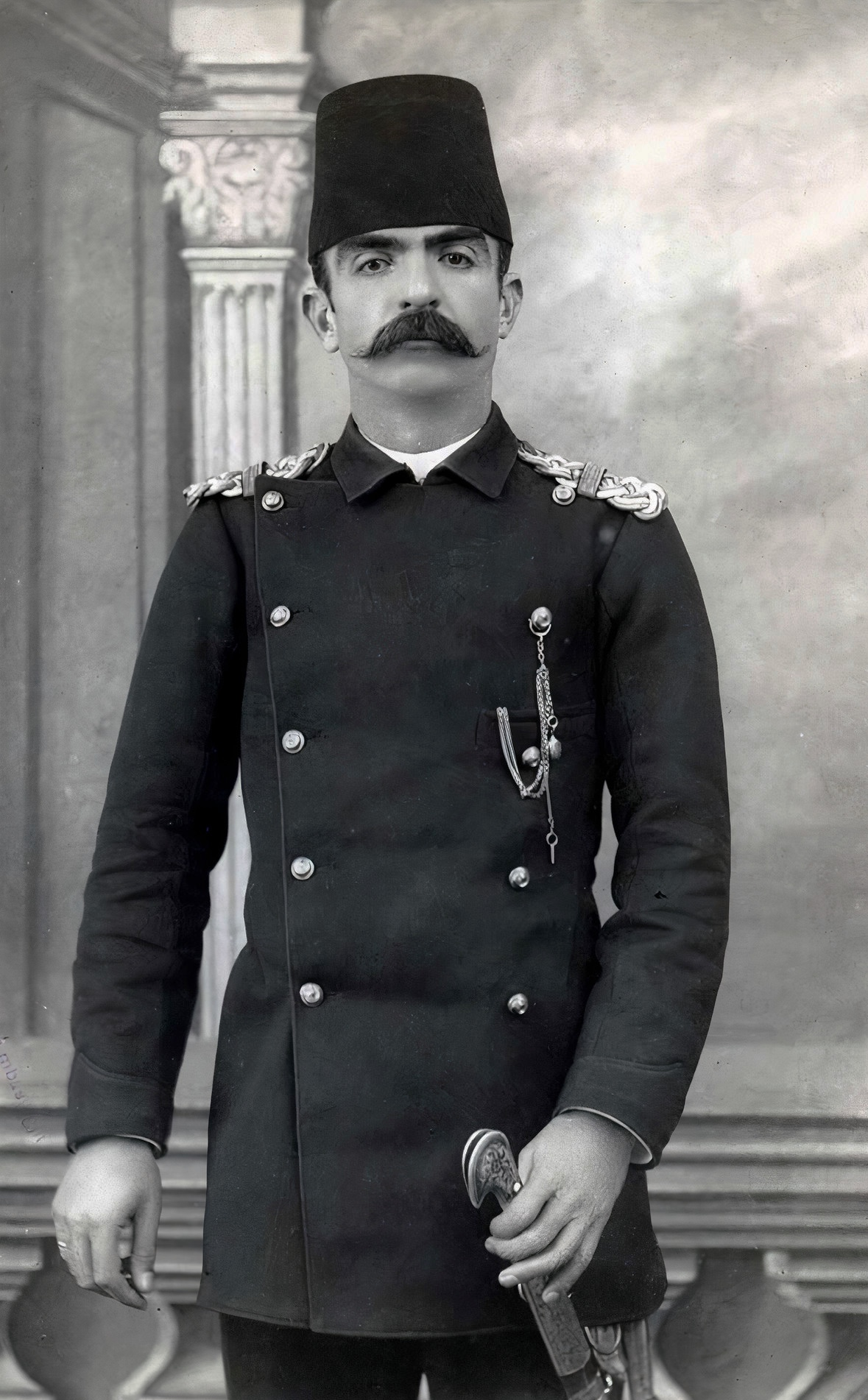

General Staff of the Ottoman Gendarmerie
- In office ?–1878

Provisional Government of Albania Minister of War
- In office 1912–1914

Personal details
- Born: 1843 Gradec, Tetovo, Ottoman Empire (modern day North Macedonia)
- Died: 1918 (aged 75) Podgorica, Kingdom of Montenegro
- Resting place: Arabati Baba Teḱe, Tetovo
- Children: Halim bey Deralla (Son); Menyr Deralla (Son); Gajur Deralla (Son); Hysen Deralla (Son); Qamile (Daughter); Fatime (Daughter); Samushe (Daughter); Zyra (Daughter)
- Parent: Hasan Deralla (father)
- Awards: Order of Freedom (Kosovo)

Military service
- Allegiance: League of Prizren; League of Peja; Provisional Government of Albania
- Battles/wars: Albanian Revolt of 1912; Albania during the Balkan Wars

Mehmet Pashë Derralla was one of the signatories of the Albanian Declaration of Independence. Mehmet Pashë Derralla was the Minister of War in the Provisional Government of Albania.

He was born in Gradec, Kalkandelen (present day Tetovo), Ottoman Empire (present-day Republic of Macedonia); and is the son of Hasan Deralla.
