= Arif Hiqmeti =

Albanian activist

- Born: Arif Neziri; 1870s Lojane, Kumanovo, Ottoman Empire (modern day North Macedonia)
- Died: 1916; Dibra, Kingdom of Serbia
- Occupation: Ottoman agent
- Known for: Peasant Revolt in Albania

Arif Hiqmeti, born Arif Neziri (1870s–1916), was one of the leaders of the Peasant Revolt in Albania.

== Early life ==
Arif Hiqmeti was born in 1870s in Lojane, a small village near Kumanovo in what is now North Macedonia, to an Albanian family. His father was a tradesman. Hiqmeti received the first lessons from a Muslim clergyman in the village. Since at a young age he showed intelligence and good communication skills. His family's powerful friends enabled him to study Law in Istanbul. After finishing studies, Hiqmeti was given a job as an agent of Hilmi Pasha.

== Ottoman service ==
Due to his skills and knowledge of several languages, he later became a secret agent of the Ottoman Empire. During that time Hiqmeti showed a staunch support for the religious policies and nature of the empire, and a disapproval of nationalist ideals that were emerging among Balkan populations. In early 20th century he was sent to the Malësia region to persuade leaders of Albanian revolts for independence to accept official Ottoman posts and stop revolting. After failing to find an agreement with leaders of Malësia, Hiqmeti began to visit many Muslim religious buildings and families across area with Albanian populations, spreading pro-Ottoman propaganda. In 1910 Hiqmeti with some collaborators of him organized at the center of Skopje a meeting where he spoke against the Congress of Manastir and its adoption of a Latin alphabet for writing in Albanian. For the same reason meetings were held in the coming weeks in other settlements with Albanian populations. According to contemporary documents, the meetings did find very few supporters among ordinary people.

== Haxhi Qamili Revolt ==
After Albania declared independence, in 1914 Hiqmeti was involved in the Peasant Revolt led by Haxhi Qamili and which had as its goal the removal of Prince Wilhelm Wied from power. The revolt gathered support from some pro-Ottoman peasants who believed that the new regime of the Principality of Albania was a tool of the six Christian Great Powers and the landowners that owned half of the arable land. However the revolt did not have success and soon it was suppressed. In 1916 Hiqmeti was shot dead by Albanian patriots from Dibra.

== Legacy ==
Hiqmeti is regarded by Albanians nowadays as a symbol of anti-democratic movements and misusage of religious ideals for personal profit.
