= Velekinca =

Velekincë Velekinca
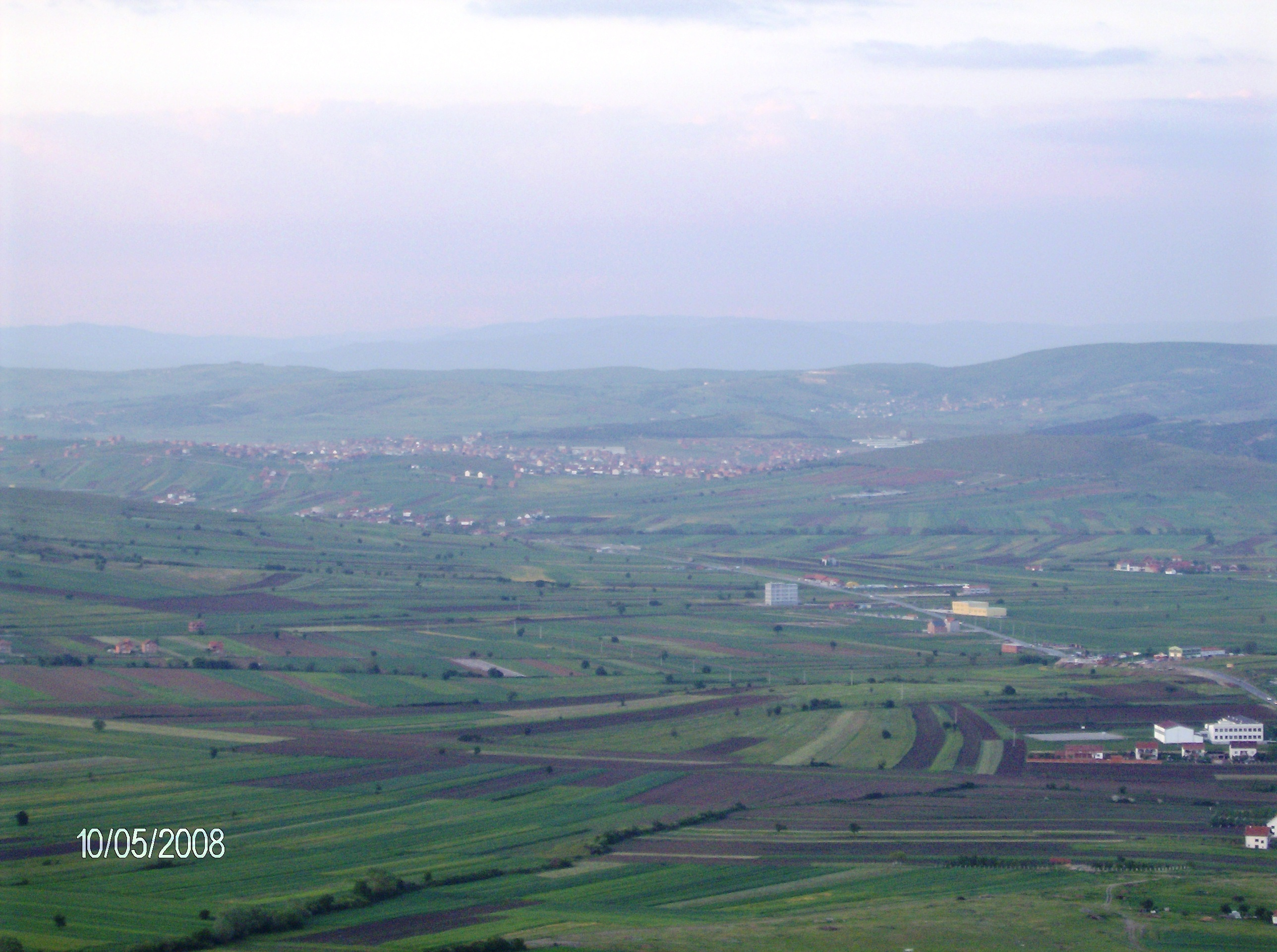

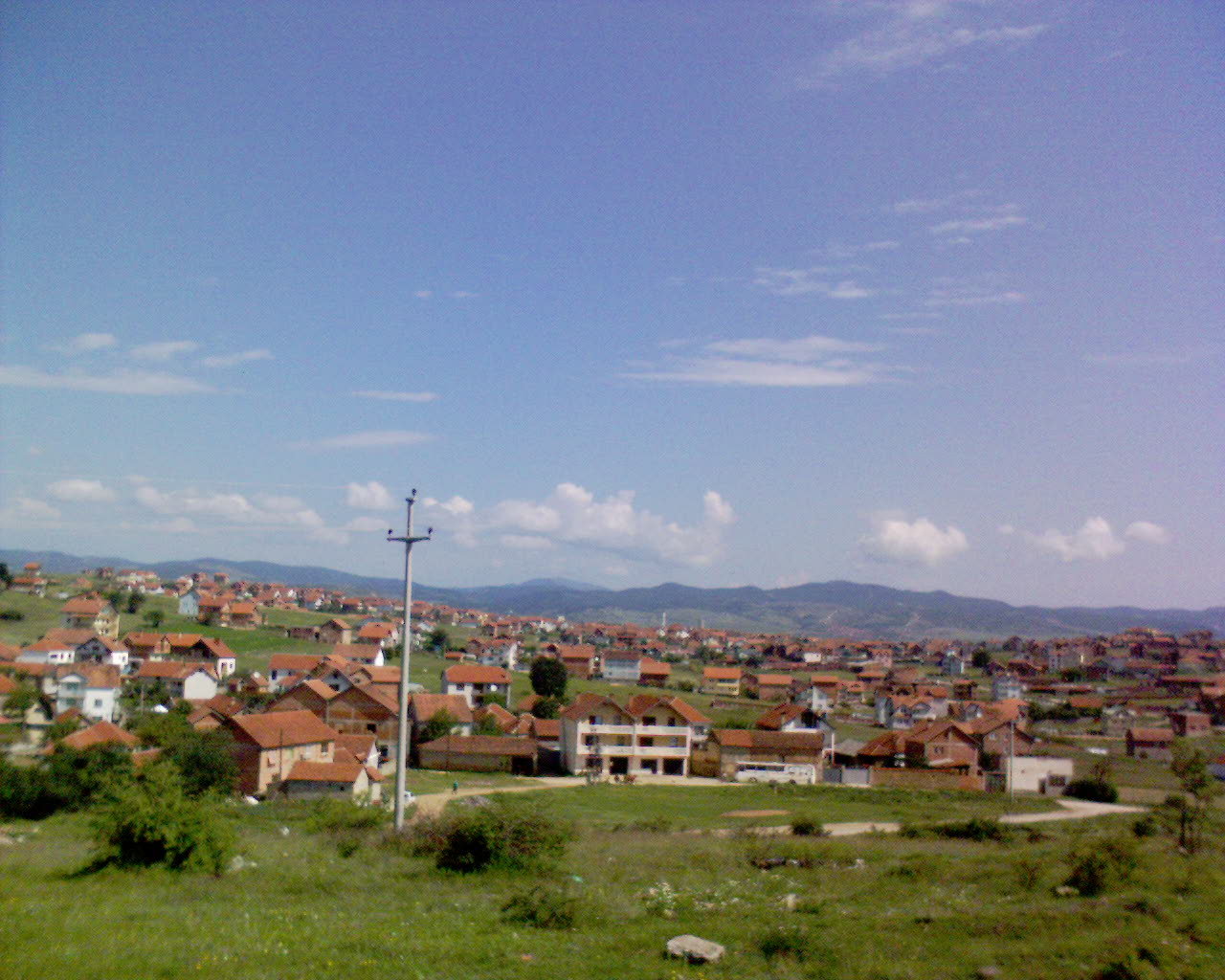

- Location in Kosovo
- Coordinates: 42°25′42″N 21°28′42″E
- Location: Kosovo
- District: Gjilan
- Municipality: Gjilan

Population (2024)
  - Total: 1,626
- Time zone: UTC+1 (CET)
  - Summer (DST): UTC+2 (CEST)

Velekincë or Velekinca is a village in the municipality of Gjilan, Kosovo. The village lies in the south-east of Kosovo on the road to Preševo, about 4 kilometers from the city center of Gjilan.

Velekinca has a continental climate with hot summers. It is located at 585 metres above sea level. The Morava River flows nearby. The village is mentioned in the writings of Herodotus. Archaeological traces were found from Illyria including coins and bowls, but various ornaments were stolen.

== Notable people ==
- Mulla Idriz Gjilani
