= 22nd Division (Yugoslav Partisans) =

Yugoslav Partisan military division formed in 1944

22nd Serbia Division
- Flag of Democratic Federal Yugoslavia (used by the Partisans)
- Active: 1944–1945
- Country: Democratic Federal Yugoslavia
- Branch: Yugoslav Partisan Army
- Type: Infantry
- Size: ~2,000 (upon formation)
- Engagements: World War II in Yugoslavia

Commanders
- Notable commanders: Živojin Nikolić Brka

The 22nd Serbia Division (Serbo-Croatian Latin: Dvadesetdruga srpska divizija) was a Yugoslav Partisan division formed on 22 May 1944 as the 2nd Serbia Division. It was formed from three brigades, those being the 8th, 10th and 12th Serbia Brigades whose total strength was around 2,000 fighters. Commander of the division was Živojin Nikolić Brka while its political commissar was Vasilije Smajević. The division fought mostly in Serbia but it also participated in battles of Syrmian Front and Final Operations.
