= Qazaxlar, Goranboy =

Qazaxlar
- Location within Azerbaijan
- Coordinates: 40°39′44″N 46°41′04″E
- Country: Azerbaijan
- Rayon: Goranboy
- Municipality: Borsunlu
- Time zone: UTC+4 (AZT)
  - Summer (DST): UTC+5 (AZT)

Qazaxlar (also, Kazakhlar and Kazakhyar) is a village in the Goranboy Rayon of Azerbaijan. The village forms part of the municipality of Borsunlu.
