= Borsunlu, Goranboy =

Borsunlu
- Municipality
- Location within Azerbaijan
- Coordinates: 40°39′06″N 46°39′44″E
- Country: Azerbaijan
- Rayon: Goranboy

Population
  - Total: 3,348
- Time zone: UTC+4 (AZT)
  - Summer (DST): UTC+5 (AZT)

Borsunlu is a village and municipality in the Goranboy Rayon of Azerbaijan. It has a population of 3,348. The municipality consists of the villages of Borsunlu and Qazaxlar.
