= Otlja =

Otlja Отља Hotël
- Village
- Location within North Macedonia
- Coordinates: 42°09′N 21°35′E
- Country: North Macedonia
- Region: Southeastern
- Municipality: Lipkovo

Population (2021)
  - Total: 2,538
- Time zone: UTC+1 (CET)
  - Summer (DST): UTC+2 (CEST)
- Car plates: KU
- Website: .

Otlja (Macedonian: Отља, Albanian: Hotël) is a village in the municipality of Lipkovo, North Macedonia.

== Demographics ==
According to the statistics of Bulgarian ethnographer Vasil Kanchov from 1900, 490 inhabitants lived in Otlja, 250 Albanian Muslims, 200 Romani and 40 Christian Bulgarians. As of the 2021 census, Otlja had 2,538 residents with the following ethnic composition:

- Albanians 2,485
- Persons for whom data are taken from administrative sources 52
- Others 1

According to the 2002 census, the village had a total of 3148 inhabitants. Ethnic groups in the village include:

- Albanians 3137
- Macedonians 0
- Others 8
