= Qazaxlar, Fuzuli =

Qazaxlar
- Municipality
- Location within Azerbaijan Location within Karabakh Economic Region
- Coordinates: 39°24′19″N 47°19′12″E
- Country: Azerbaijan
- District: Fuzuli

Population
  - Total: 843
- Time zone: UTC+4 (AZT)

Qazaxlar (Gazakhlar) is a village and municipality in the Fuzuli District of Azerbaijan. It has a population of 843.
