= 24th Division (Yugoslav Partisans) =

Yugoslav Partisan military division formed in 1944

24th Serbia Division
- Flag of Democratic Federal Yugoslavia (used by the Partisans)
- Active: 1944–1945
- Country: Democratic Federal Yugoslavia
- Branch: Yugoslav Partisan Army
- Type: Infantry
- Size: ~2,000 (upon formation)
- Engagements: World War II in Yugoslavia

Commanders
- Notable commanders: Mile Čalović

The 24th Serbia Division (Serbo-Croatian Latin: Dvadesetčetvrta srpska divizija) was a Yugoslav Partisan division formed on 10 June 1944 as the 4th Serbia Division in Jablanica. It was formed from the 11th and 17th Serbia Brigades which numbered around 2000 fighters in total. Soon after the formation the 13th and the 15th Serbia Brigades were also added to the division. The division was under the direct command of the Supreme Headquarters until 6 September 1944 when it became a part of the 13th Corps. Its commander was Mile Čalović while its political commissar was Dimitrije Vrbica.
