= Limon Staneci =

- Born: 1916; Stanevce, Preševo, Kingdom of Serbia
- Died: 1991 (aged 74–75); Preševo, SFR Yugoslavia
- Education: Jurisprudence on the University of Belgrade
- Occupation: Journalist
- Years active: 1941–1947
- Organization(s): Balli Kombëtar, Second League of Prizren
- Known for: Anti-Communist activities
- Criminal charges: Mass Murder
- Criminal penalty: Death sentence later changed to 20 years imprisonment

Limon (Aslan) Staneci (1916–1991) was a journalist, anti-communist and Balli Kombëtar member, born in Stanevce, Preševo in the Karadak Mountains of Yugoslavia.

== Early life ==
Staneci attended the Faculty of Law at the University of Belgrade. He then went on to become the deputy secretary and sub-professor in Gjilan. Later, he served as the secretary of the Regional Committee of the Second League of Prizren and also held the position of deputy secretary and sub-professor.

He was responsible for handling information related to the organization of the Second League of Prizren for the freedom movement on the eastern front. He also prepared military reports from the frontlines to fight for the protection of Albanian territories in Eastern Kosovo, which were published in the newspaper "Liria" of the Second League of Prizren.

He was elected Deputy Secretary of Nënprefekturës Presevo. He also served as secretary to Mullah Idriz Hajrullahu.

After the war, he stayed in Karadak. However, following the suppression of the resistance to release Albanian lands, he had to capitulate on March 20, 1947.

== Conviction ==
Serb witnesses accused him of more than 20 murders of exiles and deportations along with Anti-Communist activities during World War II in Karadak. He declared that he had stayed faithful to his patriotic duties. The District Court in Gjilan, headed by the Russian Zaharije on 6 October 1947 sentenced him to death by firing squad. However, the Presidium of SFRY's Assembly on 13 August 1947, converted his death sentence into 20 years imprisonment.
