= 25th Division (Yugoslav Partisans) =

Yugoslav Partisan military division formed in 1944

25th Serbia Division
- Flag of Democratic Federal Yugoslavia (used by the Partisans)
- Active: 1944–1945
- Country: Democratic Federal Yugoslavia
- Branch: Yugoslav Partisan Army
- Type: Infantry
- Size: ~2,000 (upon formation)
- Engagements: World War II in Yugoslavia

The 25th Serbia Division (Serbo-Croatian Latin: Dvadesetpeta srpska divizija) was a Yugoslav Partisan division formed on 10 June 1944 in Jošanica. It was formed from the 16th, 18th and 19th Serbia Brigades. Upon formation it had around 3,000 soldiers, it grew to around 12,000 by December 1944. The division was direct command of the Supreme Headquarters until 6 September 1944. It became a part of the 2nd Army in January 1945.
