= Mulla Idriz Gjilani =

Albanian military leader (1901–1949)

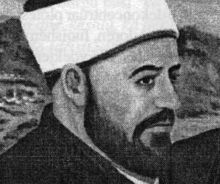
- Born: June 4, 1901; Velekinca, Gjilan, Ottoman Empire, (Today: Kosovo)
- Died: November 26, 1949 (aged 48)
- Children: Isa Mullaidrizi (Hajrullahu)
- Military career
- Allegiance: Italian protectorate of Albania; Albania (German client); Second League of Prizren
- Branch: Royal Albanian Army
- Service years: 1941–1945
- Rank: Commander
- Unit: IV Regiment of the Royal Albanian Army
- Known for: Fighting Partisans, Serbs and Bulgarians, Being Burned alive by the Partisans
- Conflicts: World War II in Yugoslavia; Insurgency in Karadak-Gollak; Battle of Preševo (1944); Battle of Desivojca; Battle of Prapashticë; Battles of Kika and Velegllava; Kumanovo operation; Kosovo Operation

Mulla Idriz Gjilani was an Albanian leader and Muslim preacher. He was born in the village of Velekinca in Gjilan, Ottoman Empire, (now Gjilan, Kosovo). The Gjilani family who have inhabited the region of his birth for centuries give their name to the town of Gjilan in Kosovo.

He took the first lessons in mejtep of Cernica, and graduated in 1911 to continue the high school in madrasah of “Atik” in Gjilan. After a long break, he graduated in 1926. At age 25, he became imam with the title of Mullah and served in Karadak and Hogosht. In 1941, he took the post of bashvaiz, Ulama in Vakuf of Shkupi.

On January 20, 2015, he was posthumously awarded the "Honor of the Nation" decoration by the President of the Republic of Albania Bujar Nishani on the occasion of the 70th anniversary of the massacre of Gjilan.

== Biography ==
He was born in 1901 in the village of Velekinca in Gjilan, at the time part of the Ottoman Empire. He graduated from the Mullah Halim Cernica's mejtep, and completed his studies in Gjilan for administrative work in 1911. He attended his education at the Atar Medrese in Gjilan. After military service in 1924-25, he graduated in 1926 with Ixhezetnamé, becoming an imam and receiving the title of mullah. He was in contact with the "National Defense of Kosovo" Committee and supported the Democratic Party of Ferhat Bey Drago, where he worked against the expulsion of the Albanian population in the Kingdom of Yugoslavia. He was the head of the imam at the Padić mosque in Karadak in 1927-32 and later in Hogosht of the Lower Moravian until 1938 when he went to the post of member of Mexhlis Ulema in Skopje, who administered the religious life of Albanian lands under the state administration of Yugoslavia.

During the Second World War, as the first of the faithful of the Islamic religion in the Gjilan / Gnjilane Prefecture, Mufti and Sub-Mufti, and as a military imam of the IV Regiment of the Albanian Kingdom Army in Pristina. He commanded a paramilitary force under the flag of the Albanian Kingdom, fighting for ethnic Albania against the Yugoslavs and the Bulgarians, which he handed over by the fall of 1944. After that he lived hiding from the Yugoslav Partisan regime, until the night of 25–26 November 1949, when Mulla Idriz was burned alive by the Partisans. Months before his death, he professed that Islam and Albanianism do harmonize.
