= Rajince =

Rajince Рајинце (Serbian) Raincë (Albanian)
- Village (Selo)
- Location within Serbia
- Coordinates: 42°22′45″N 21°41′44″E
- Country: Serbia
- District: Pčinja District
- Municipality: Preševo

Area
  - Total: 14.06 km^{2} (5.43 sq mi)

Population (2002)
  - Total: 1,954
  - Density: 139.0/km^{2} (359.9/sq mi)
- Time zone: UTC+1 (CET)
  - Summer (DST): UTC+2 (CEST)

Rajince (Serbian Cyrillic: Рајинце; Albanian: Raincë) is a village located in the municipality of Preševo, Serbia. According to the 2002 census, the settlement had a population of 1,954 inhabitants. Of these, 1944 (99,48 %) were ethnic Albanians, 2 (0,10 %) were ethnic Serbs, 1 (0,05 %) ethnic Romani, and 6 (0,30 %) others.
