= Sopot, Kumanovo =

Sopot
- Village
- Сопот
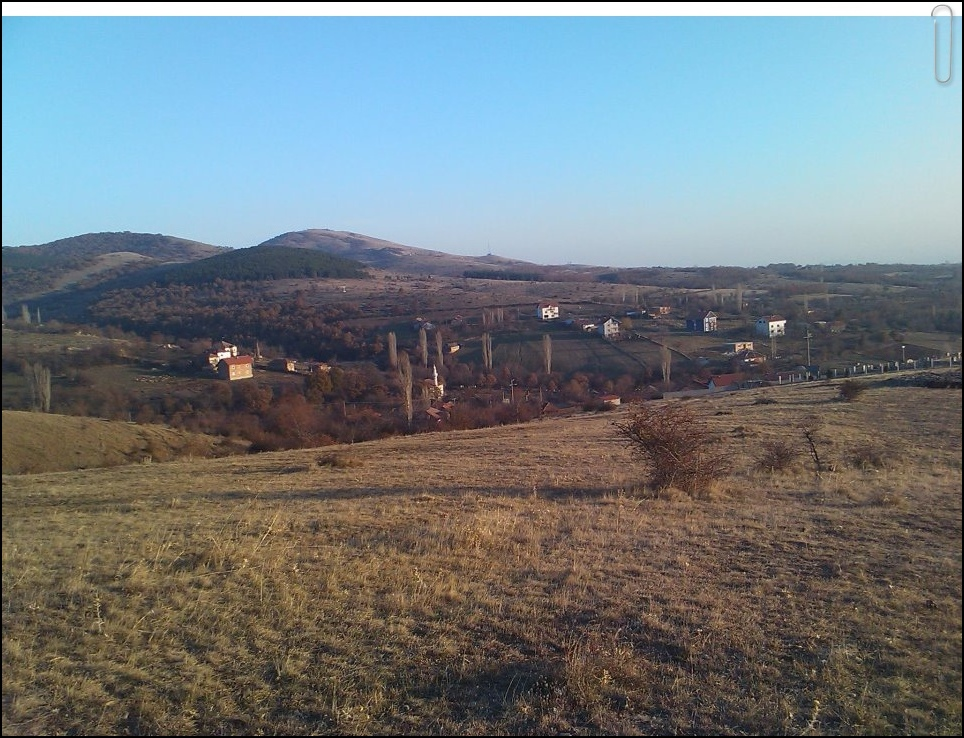
- View of the village

- Location within North Macedonia
- Coordinates: 42°14′34″N 21°43′50″E
- Country: North Macedonia
- Region: Northeastern
- Municipality: Kumanovo

Population (2002)
  - Total: 318
- Time zone: UTC+1 (CET)
  - Summer (DST): UTC+2 (CEST)
- Car plates: KU
- Website: .

Sopot (Macedonian: Сопот, Albanian: Sopot) is a village in the municipality of Kumanovo, North Macedonia. It is located near the Serbian border.

== History ==
On the 3rd and 4 November 1944, the village was the scene of a massacre, in which a total of 68 Albanians were killed by the XVII Macedonian Partisan Brigade and members of the Chetnik movement.

== Demographics ==
According to the 2002 census, the village had a total of 318 inhabitants. Ethnic groups in the village include:

- Albanians 306
- Serbs 6
- Macedonians 2
- Bosniaks 1
- Others 3
