= Crnotince =

Crnotince Црнотинце (Serbian) Corroticë (Albanian)
- Village (Selo)
- Location within Serbia
- Country: Serbia
- District: Pčinja District
- Municipality: Preševo

Population (2002)
  - Total: 1,454
- Time zone: UTC+1 (CET)
  - Summer (DST): UTC+2 (CEST)

Crnotince (Serbian Cyrillic: Црнотинце; Albanian: Corroticë) is a village in the municipality of Preševo, Serbia. According to the 2002 census, the village had a population of 1,454 people. Of these, 1,445 (99.38 %) were ethnic Albanians, and 4 (0.27 %) others.
