= Xhem Hasa =

Albanian nationalist and Axis collaborator

Xhemë Hasa
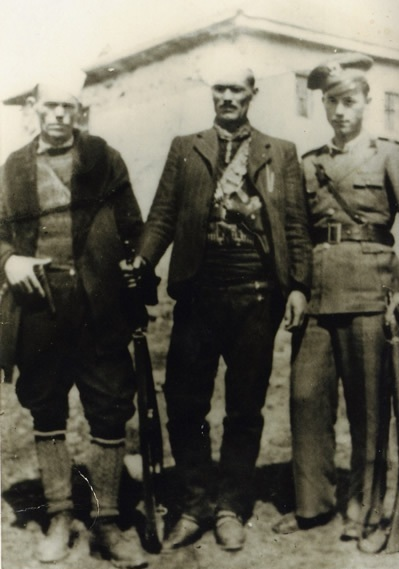
- Hasa (centre) with his brothers, Musli Hasa (left) and Abdullah Hasa (right)
- Born: March 1908; Simnica, Gostivar, Kosovo Vilayet, Ottoman Empire (modern North Macedonia)
- Died: May 6, 1945 (aged 37)
- Military career
- Allegiance: Protectorate of Albania (Italian protectorate); Albanian Kingdom (Nazi client state)
- Branch: Royal Italian Army; Balli Kombëtar
- Service years: 1941–1945
- Rank: Commander
- Nickname: Xhemo
- Commands: Balli Kombëtar
- Conflicts: World War II in Yugoslavia; World War II in Yugoslav Macedonia

Xhemail Hasani (1908 – 6 May 1945), known as Xhemë Hasa and Xhemë Gostivari, was an Albanian nationalist and Axis collaborator, in charge of the Balli Kombëtar's activities in the western regions of Yugoslav Macedonia, a part of Yugoslavia occupied by Fascist Italy and Nazi Germany during World War II.

== Early life ==
Xhem Hasa was born in the village of Simnica near Gostivar, and grew up in a poor family with many children. During his childhood, up until his early stages of adulthood, Xhem worked as a farmer on his family's farm.

== Exile in Albania ==
Hasa murdered the head of the gendarmerie in Gostivar, who had abused the local Albanians, and fled through Mount Korab to Albania where he sought asylum in 1936. He lived on the outskirts of Elbasan, where he was soon joined by two of his brothers, Musli and Abdullah, and their families.

Despite escaping, the Yugoslav authorities put pressure on Hasa's family to convince him to return to Yugoslavia, where he would be tried for the murder of the head of police. The authorities jailed two of his brothers along with Hasa's wife and mother. After imprisonment, the family was expelled to Turkey. On the stop to Thessaloniki, they moved to Elbasan and settle with Xhem in Albania.

== World War II ==
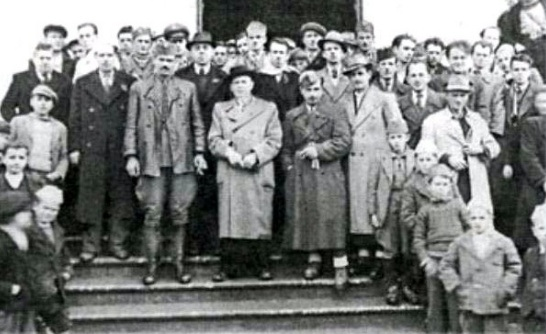
The Albanian National Meeting in the city of Tetovo (center left, Xhem Hasa and center right, Mefail Shehu).

After the fall of Greece and Yugoslavia in April 1941, Hasa returned to Gostivar, where he gathered local Albanians to form a group of fighters who occupied Gostivar. In the autumn of 1943, Germany occupied all of Albania after Italy had capitulated. The Balli Kombëtar made a deal with the Germans and formed a collaborationist government in Tirana which continued its war with the LANÇ and Yugoslav Partisans. Xhem Hasa and his battalion was incorporated into the Balli Kombëtar. Hasa's victories in battle led to his elevation as the commander of the Balli Kombëtar in Macedonia.

However, both Yugoslav and Albanian partisans confronted the Ballist forces. When Maqellarë, midway between Debar and Peshkopi, was recaptured by the Fifth Partisan Brigade, the Germans with the assistance of the Hasa's Ballists launched an attack from Debar, defeating the partisans. Fiqri Dine, Xhem Hasa and Hysni Dema as well as three German Majors directed military campaigns against the Albanian and Yugoslav partisans. Hasa was a close acquaintance of Mefail Shehu and would often send troops from Gostivar and Tetovo to aid him.

=== Death ===
Yugoslav Partisans faced difficulty when fighting Hasa. This resulted in the Yugoslav Partisans bribing a close associate of Xhem to assassinate him. On May 6, 1945, Hasa was killed by a close associate. It has been rumored that the associate was his brother in-law. According to another version from Ballist co-fighters, he was poisoned (always from his close collaborators on behalf of OZNA) on April 2, 1945. When dead, his head was cut off and sent as proof in Gostivar where it stayed for two days. Balli Kombëtar members managed to retrieve it in order to stop the post-mortem humiliation.

== Legacy ==
Hasa was one of the most famous Ballist Axis Powers collaborators in World War II. Enver Hoxha, Communist leader of Albania, had a great dislike of Hasa and the Ballist movement.

In 2010, the Macedonian Albanian political party New Democracy proposed for a monument of Hasa to be built in Gostivar. One has been erected in his birthplace, the village of Simnica, in 2006.
