= Lojane =

Lojane Лојане Llojan
- Village
- Location within North Macedonia
- Coordinates: 42°14′N 21°40′E
- Country: North Macedonia
- Region: Northeastern
- Municipality: Lipkovo

Population (2021)
  - Total: 1,905
- Time zone: UTC+1 (CET)
  - Summer (DST): UTC+2 (CEST)
- Car plates: KU
- Website: .

Lojane (Macedonian: Лојане, Albanian: Llojan) is a village in the municipality of Lipkovo, North Macedonia. The settlement has an ethnic Albanian majority. The village is located on the border with Miratovac, municipality of Preševo, Serbia.

== Demographics ==
According to the 2021 census, the village had a total of 1,905 inhabitants. Ethnic groups in the village include:

- Albanians: 1,858
- Undeclared: 47

According to the 2002 census, the village had a total of 2,682 inhabitants. Ethnic groups in the village include:

- Albanians: 2,668
- Bosniaks: 3
- Others: 11

== Notable people ==
- Arif Hiqmeti
