= Gajur Deralla =

Albanian soldier (1909–1943)

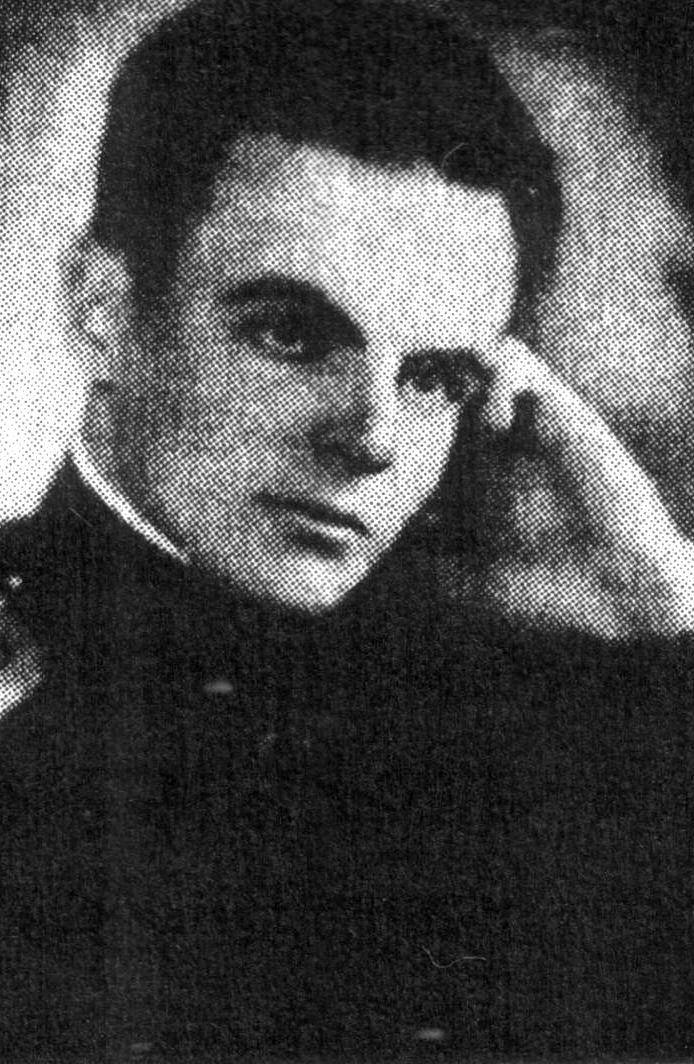
- Born: January 1, 1909; Tetovo, Ottoman Empire (modern North Macedonia)
- Died: 1943 (aged 34) Bukovici, Albania (under Nazi Germany)
- Allegiance: Albania (under Fascist Italy & Nazi Germany)
- Branch: Royal Albanian Army; Royal Italian Army; Balli Kombëtar
- Service years: 1941–1943
- Rank: Captain
- Conflicts: National Liberation War of Macedonia

Gajur Dëralla^{[a]} was captain of the Luboten Battalion. The Luboten Battalion was a military division of the Balli Kombëtar which operated in Albania under Fascist Italy and Nazi Germany.

== Biography ==
=== Early life ===
Dëralla was born in Tetovo in 1909. Gajur was the son of Albanian patriot Mehmet Pashë Dërralla and brother of Halim Dëralla, involved in Albania's independence movement, and Hysen Dëralla, who would become a Major of the Luboten Battalion. Dëralla studied at the Yugoslav Military Academy. During his years at the military academy, Dëralla came into contact with Italian intelligence agency, OVRA. Deralla left the Kingdom of Yugoslavia and fled to Albania. In Albania, Dëralla enlisted as a regular soldier in the Royal Albanian Army. On April 12, 1939, Italy occupied Albania. After the Italian occupation of Albania, Deralla became an Officer in the Royal Italian Army.

=== Return to Tetovo ===
In 1941, Italian forces occupied Vardar Banovina. Dëralla returned to Tetovo, where he joined the Luboten Battalion as a captain. The battalion was responsible for securing the region from resistance groups, i.e. Yugoslav partisans. With the capitulation of Italy in 1943, Nazi Germany took control of the region.

=== Balli Kombëtar ===
Despite the Luboten Battalion being formed by the Italian forces, The Germans did not disband the battalion. Instead, the Luboten Battalion was incorporated into the Balli Kombëtar, strengthening its forces. The troops under Dëralla successfully repelled the Yugoslav partisans in Tetovo. Tetovo had the largest Balli Kombëtar base in Macedonia and was the centre of the Ballist movement in the region.

=== Death ===
At the end of 1943, the Luboten division was sent to Kičevo to help the Ballist (Balli Kombëtar) forces of Mefail Shehu against the Yugoslav partisans. The Luboten Battalion, augmented by additional troops from the Balli Kombëtar, to attack and dislodge partisan units fighting in Kicevo. En route to Kicevo, Petar Brajovic's partisan forces organised an ambush at Bukovici. When Dëralla and his forces went through Bukovici, the partisans successfully ambushed the battalion resulting in the death of Dëralla and his troops.

== Notes ==
a.	Albanian spelling: Gajur Dërralla, Serbo-Croat spelling: Gajur Derala, Гајур Дерала.
