= Mefail Shehu =

Albanian military commander (1898–1945)

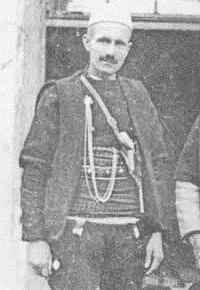
- Born: 1898; Zajas, Kosovo Vilayet, Ottoman Empire (modern North Macedonia)
- Died: November 1945 (aged 47); Zajas, PR Macedonia, FPR Yugoslavia (modern North Macedonia)
- Other name: Mefail Zajazi
- Military career
- Allegiance: Albanian Kingdom
- Branch: Balli Kombëtar
- Service years: 1939–1945
- Rank: Commander
- Nickname: Mefaili i Madh (Big Mefail)
- Commands: Kičevo Region Command
- Conflicts: World War II in Yugoslav Macedonia

Mefail Shehu, also known as Mefaili i Madh or Mefail Zajazi (1898 – November 1945), was a Balli Kombëtar military commander and leader of the Kicevo region during World War II. He was a close associate of Xhem Hasa.

== Biography ==
=== Early life ===
Mefail Shehu was born in Zajas in 1898. His ideology of Albanian nationalism was formed during his adolescence. As a child, Shehu witnessed the terror of the Serbian royalists under King Alexander where 11 Albanian populated villages in the east of Kicevo were razed.

=== 1939 and onwards ===
Shehu was against the Italian occupation and in 1939 formed his own militia to fight against the fascists. On 19 April 1941, Kicevo was occupied by German forces. On 22 June 1941, Kicevo became a part of the new Albanian state under Germany. At this time, Mit'hat Frashëri published the Balli Kombëtar program around the new Albanian state. The Balli Kombëtar ideology greatly appealed to Shehu. Shehu formed the Balli Kombëtar in Kicevo and held many demonstrations to rally support. The people of Kicevo supported the Balli Kombëtar over the communists.

The Balli Kombëtar committee held a meeting in Zajas in 1942. Representatives of the Albanian tribes that attended the meeting elected Shehu as military commander of the region. Shehu transformed the bands of militia into a proper army. Shehu's battalion patrolled villages around Zajas while commander Mefail Mehmeti(Mefail i Vogel) and his battalion patrolled from Greshnica to Kicevo. Shehu's third elected commander, Begzat Vuli operated from Kicevo to Berikove. At that period, the Ballists successfully repelled the Yugoslav partisans. Shehu not only fought in Zajas but also in Skopje, Gostivar and Debar. While fighting away from Zajas, Shehu became associated with Xhem Hasa.

In October 1943, a general assembly was called in Zajas. It was decided that the chairman of the committee of the Balli Kombëtar will be Mefail Shehu, along with Mefail Mehmeti as vice chairman, Begzat Vuli as treasurer and Skender Presevo as under prefect.

As the Albanian partisans and Yugoslav partisans were on the rise and the Germans reducing its aid to the Balli Kombëtar, Shehu was gradually losing his territory to the partisans.

=== Death ===
In November 1945, Mefail Shehu was killed in an ambush with his remaining soldiers by the partisans.
He was referred to as a traitor by the pro-Yugoslavian Albanian Communists.
