= Nəzirli =

- Municipality
- Location within Azerbaijan Location within Karabakh Economic Region
- Coordinates: 40°25′23″N 47°02′47″E
- Country: Azerbaijan
- Rayon: Barda

Population
  - Total: 710
- Time zone: UTC+4 (AZT)
  - Summer (DST): UTC+5 (AZT)

Nəzirli (also, Nazirli and Nazırlı) is a village and municipality in the Barda Rayon of Azerbaijan. It has a population of 710.
