= Second League of Prizren =

World War II Albanian paramilitary organization

The Second League of Prizren was an organisation founded by Albanian officials in occupied Kingdom of Yugoslavia, modern-day Kosovo in September 1943 to campaign for the ethnic unification of Albanians in Albania.

From 1918, Kosovo was integrated into the newly formed Kingdom of Yugoslavia and ethnic Albanians in Kosovo faced forced evacuation by the Yugoslav government to Albania or Turkey.

As a result, the Italian occupation of Albania in 1939 encouraged many leading Albanians to lobby the Italians to incorporate areas with sizeable Albanian populations like Kosovo into Albania and were encouraged by Mussolini's support of the Greater Albania ideology. However, the Italian surrender on 3 September 1943 stymied these dreams temporarily and attention was turned to the Germans who had occupied Debar and western Macedonia.

Bedri Pejani, a political leader who supported an expanded Albanian state that included all Albanian people, wrote to Reichsführer-SS Heinrich Himmler to request his assistance in establishing a Greater Albania. In return he offered to help raise an Albanian fighting force to work with the German Wehrmacht to achieve this aim. Himmler agreed to the request and ordered the formation of two ethnic Albanian Waffen SS Divisions and sponsored the foundation of the Albanian nationalist organisation which became the Second League of Prizren.

Named in honour of the original League of Prizren, founded in 1878 to fight for Albania's independence, the aim of the Second League of Prizren was to ensure the continuation of Greater Albania. Pejani was appointed President of the League and Albanian Prime Minister Rexhep Mitrovica as chairman of the central committee. Aćif Hadžiahmetović and Cafo Beg Ulqini were appointed as members of the central committee.

The Albanian Quisling government campaigned unsuccessfully for the transfer of the northern tip of Kosovo to Albania which remained under direct German governance, but raised volunteers to fight against the army and police forces of Yugoslavia. The Second of League of Prizren maintained the Albanian Ljuboten battalion initially formed by the Italian occupation forces. In conjunction with the Waffen SS, the Second League of Prizren also formed the Albanian Skanderbeg SS Division to maintain the military occupation of the Macedonian and Serbian Orthodox Slavic populations. As a result, 6,491 ethnic Albanians were drafted into the Waffen SS, as well as an additional 300 ethnic Albanians who were serving with the Bosnian Muslim 13th Waffen Gebirgs Division who were transferred to the Skanderbeg Division.

The SS Skanderbeg was heavily fought by Albanian and Yugoslav partisans, including Kosovo partisans of Fadil Hoxha. The strength of the partisans in Kosovo had somehow increased after 1943 Italian surrender, but the pro-German units were an opponent especially when it came to recruiting people. SS Skanderbeg had a propagandist advantage which caused the partisan units to much trouble in recruiting, especially after summer of 1944 when the partisans of Enver Hoxha agreed to Yugoslav claims of recognizing the borders of before World War II, which automatically left Kosovo and western Macedonia out of Albania.

The Skanderbeg Division was poorly trained and ill suited to warfare and performed poorly. On 30 August 1944, the Skanderbeg Division was forced to retreat from Debar and the League began to lose any influence it had with Germany. The retreat of German forces from Albania ensured the end of the League, although Communist officials were methodical in their retribution against League members.

== See also ==
- Yugoslav colonization of Kosovo
- Invasion of Yugoslavia
- Third League of Prizren
