= Shaqir Smaka =

Albanian guerrilla commander

- Born: 1887; Kastriot, Kosovo, Ottoman Empire
- Died: 1916 (aged 28–29); Banja, Drenica, Austria-Hungary
- Military career
- Allegiance: Kachaks
- Branch: Albanian guerrilla forces
- Service years: circa 1905–1916
- Rank: Commander
- Conflicts: Albanian Revolt of 1910; Battle of Carraleva Pass; Battle of Kaçanik Pass; Albanian Revolt of 1912; Battle of Deviç; Capture of Üskup; First Balkan War; World War I; Siege of Kastriot; Siege of Qubrel; Battle of Rakinicë; Battle of Gjurgjevik; Battle of Klladërnica; Battle of Bajë †

Shaqir Smaka (c. 1887 – 1916) was an Albanian guerrilla commander from the Drenica region of Kosovo. He played an important role in the resistance against Ottoman, Serbian, and Austro-Hungarian forces during the early 20th century.

== Early life ==
Shaqir Smaka was born in the village of Kastriot in the Drenica region. Growing up during a period of political unstability following the decline of Ottoman control in the Balkans, Smaka became involved early on in the Albanian National Awakening.

== Career ==
=== Albanian Revolt of 1910 ===
During the 1910 Albanian uprising against the Ottoman Empire, Smaka joined insurgent forces led by Commandes such as Idriz Seferi and Isa Boletini. The revolt saw 31,000 Albanian troops confronting Ottoman troops. Smaka fought in the Battle of Kaçanik Gorge, where rebel forces resisted the Ottoman army for several days before retreating after heavy artillery bombardment.

==== Battle of Carraleva ====
After the Battle of Kaçanik, Smaka regrouped with rebels in Carraleva, where he commanded fighters from Kostërrc, Runik, and Vitak. There was a battle, led by Isa Boletini and Hasan Budakova. Many Albanian fighters were killed or captured in the encounter.

=== Albanian Revolt of 1912 ===
In the 1912 uprising Smaka was present at the liberation of Shkup (Skopje), Smaka commanded the operation to break the Ottoman prison in Shkup, helping free over 960 Albanian prisoners.

=== Role in the Kachak Movement ===
Following the Serbian and Montenegrin occupation of Kosovo in 1912–1913, Smaka became a major commander in the Kaçak guerrilla resistance in northern Drenica. Supported initially by Hasan Prishtina, Smaka organized ambushes and attacks against occupying forces.

=== Siege of Kastriot (1913) ===
In late 1913, Serbian troops besieged Smaka’s village Kostërc, demanding a surrender. Smaka refused and opened fire with the attackers, successfully ending the siege despite heavy reprisals that included the burning of his house.

=== Siege of Qubrel (1914) ===
Smaka, along with Azem Bejta and Fazli Berani, was besieged in the village of Qubrel by Serbian forces. The rebels refused to surrender and managed to end the siege.

=== Battle of Rakinicë (1915) ===
In 1915, during Austro-Hungarian and Bulgarian occupation, Smaka and his fighters resisted a large enemy force besieging the village of Rakinicë. Despite being outnumbered, they managed to inflict significant casualties and escaped the siege.

=== Assembly of Padalishtë (Late 1915) ===
Smaka led the Kachak delegation in negotiations with Austro-Hungarian forces, refusing demands to disarm and surrender. The talk failed, resulting in more military campaigns against the rebels.

=== Battle of Gjurgjevik (1915) ===
Facing a Bulgarian invasion, Smaka led local fighters to defend Gjurgjevik village. The battle resulted in heavy casualties for both sides, with Rebels forces killing 19 Bulgarians.

=== Battle of Klladërnica (1916) ===
In early 1916, Smaka and his allies defended the village an Austro-Hungarian attack in Klladërnica, killing eleven enemy soldiers. The battle resulted in arrests and deportations of local civilians. Smaka's brother Mehmet died in prison after being tortured.

== Death ==
Shaqir Smaka was killed in combat near the village of Baje in 1916. Tradition says that he died during a personal fight with Austrian commander Hirtman, after which the Austrian forces captured and burned his body as revenge for the death of their Commander.

== Legacy ==
A street in Skenderaj is named after Shaqir Smaka.

== See also ==
- Azem Galica
- Kachak Movement
- Drenica
- History of Kosovo

== Sources ==
- Ahmetaj, Demir (1996). Lëvizja Kombëtare Kaçake në Drenicën Veriore nën udhëheqjen e Shaqir Smakës dhe Azem Bejtës. Pristina.
