= Battle of Drenogllava =

- Part of Albanian revolt of 1910
Date	30 April 1910
Location	Drenogllava, Karatonlu Nahiya, Kosovo Vilayet, Ottoman Empire
Result	Albanian victory

Belligerents
Albanian rebels	Ottoman Empire

Commanders and leaders
Idriz Seferi; Isa Boletini; Mulla Sinan Maxhera; Raman Topalli; Sali Kupina; Din Kabashi; Halim Benguca; Milaim Katil Ahmeti; Mustaf Xhema; Fetah Proshi	Osman Pasha; Feyzulla Bey; Sahid Bey; Sadedin Bey

Units involved
Kachaks	19th Infantry Division

Strength
Unknown	15,000

Casualties and losses
500 killed and wounded (Ottoman claim)	Ottoman claim: 121 killed (including 8 officers); Serbian estimate: 780 killed or wounded three bölükbaşı captured two Aghas captured 120 Soldiers captured 80 horses captured

The Battle of Drenogllava (Albanian: Beteja e Drenogllavës), also known as the Battle of Karadak (Albanian: Beteja e Karadakut), was a battle between Albanian rebels led by Idriz Seferi and Isa Boletini and Ottoman forces during the Revolt of 1910. The clashes represented an attempt by the Ottomans to break the Albanian rebels in the region.

== Background ==
Following the Albanian defeats at the Battles of Kaçanik and Carraleva during the Albanian revolt of 1910, Albanian rebels under leaders such as Idriz Seferi, Abaz Bekteshi, Islam Pra, Sinan Maxhera etc. withdrew toward the mountainous region of Karadak, where they reorganized into small guerrilla units (Chetas). Operating in difficult and largely unfamiliar terrain for the Ottoman army, these formations carried out a series of rapid strikes and ambushes, relying on captured weapons and limited ammunition to inflict continual losses on Ottoman columns moving through the area.

During the withdrawal from Kaçanik, Idriz Seferi and his companions began planning a new engagement while still on the move. Ottoman forces advancing from Skopje and Ferizaj were expected to converge in the region of Drenogllava in Karadak, a maneuver that threatened to complete an encirclement of the insurgent forces. Reports of atrocities committed by Ottoman troops against nearby Albanian villages further increased the urgency of organizing a defensive stand.

Drenogllava was chosen by the Albanian fighters as a strategic stronghold. Its rugged terrain complicated large-scale Ottoman operations and provided the insurgents with favorable positions as well as viable routes of retreat. The insurgent command requested provisions and ammunition for several days of sustained fighting, while units arriving from Gollak and the Morava Valley were reinforced by the local population and took up positions intended to block the Ottoman encirclement.

== Battle ==
On 2 March 1910, Osman Pasha assembled the Ottoman army consisting of around 15,000 men, detailing their tasks. Around 3,000 troops under Feyza Bey were to march from Preševo towards Karadak, while another group from Skopje prepared to approach Drenogllava under Sahid Bey. Osman Pasha himself led 6,000 troops. In late April the Ottoman Army under Osman Pasha began to move from the Kaçanik Gorge toward Karadak and was joined by the third column under Sahid Bey sent toward the Llokma mountain and the Drenogllava pass. In response, the Albanian insurgents deployed across several fronts. Idriz Seferi and the fighters from Karadak took position on the southern and partly western side of Drenogllava. A second group, including Feriz Çaushi, Beqir Sadovina, Ram Pozharani and Shabi Kaja, held the eastern side, where they were instructed to offer limited resistance in order to draw Ottoman units into prepared positions. From the north, fighters marching from Gollak and the Morava Valley reached the area and were reinforced by the local population, securing the Gërdisht–Qafkan and Nikovc–Korbliq lines essential for closing the encirclement. Fighting intensified across the Korbliq–Drenogllava–Smirë region. Ottoman forces were repeatedly driven into narrow valleys and streams where they were unable to maneuver or retreat. Insurgent accounts attribute the deaths of around 200 Ottoman soldiers and officers in the Terstenik stream to Idriz Seferi and his companions from Karadak. Near Nikovc, they reportedly captured three bölükbaşıs and two Aghas alive. The insurgents, fighting on familiar terrain and strengthened by weapons and ammunition captured earlier at Kaçanik, forced part of the Ottoman troops into the gorge of the Livadhi i Isufit Stream. Hundreds of Ottoman soldiers trying to escape the encirclement were killed and wounded, 120 were captured and imprisoned in the mosque of Smirë, and the insurgents seized additional arms, ammunition, and the battle flag of one Ottoman column, which were taken to Smirë. Simultaneously another engagement took place in the village of Korbliq, two columns under Sahid Bey, coming from Skopje, were attacked by the insurgents and swiftly destroyed. As a last-ditch attempt to turn the tide of the battle, a specialized Ottoman detachment was reportedly dispatched to locate and kill Idriz Seferi. The group was detected by Halim Benguca and his comrades, who confronted and destroyed about half of the unit before it could reach Idriz Seferi. Despite the numerical superiority of the Ottoman forces, they were overwhelmed by the guerrilla tactics of the Albanian insurgents. After hours of fighting the Ottoman troops were broken and forced to withdraw.

== Legacy ==
Insurgent testimony describes the battle as one of the most violent of the Albanian revolt of 1910. Turkish historian Süleyman Külçe reports that the clash between Nikovc and Smirë on 30 April resulted in 8 officers and 113 soldiers killed or wounded on the Ottoman side, and claims that the Albanian insurgents suffered 500 losses. The Serbian consulate in Skopje, by contrast, reported that the insurgents had captured 80 horses and ammunition, that Ottoman forces suffered approximately 780 killed and wounded in Drenogllava, and that in total more than 2,000 Ottoman soldiers had been killed in Karadak and the Kaza of Gjilan following the Battle of Kaçanik.

The main Albanian commanders of the battle were Idriz Seferi, Raman Topalli, Mulla Sinan Maxhera, Sali Kupina, Din Kabashi, Halim Benguca, Milaim Katil Ahmeti, Mustaf Xhema, and Fetah Proshi. Rebels who participated in the battle also mention the presence of Seferi’s 19-year-old son, Qazim Seferi, as well as insurgents from Drenogllava, Kryedren, Korbliq, Nikovc and Smirë. Idriz Seferi’s wife, Baftija, is also described as having joined the battlefield.

Local oral tradition and historical songs preserve memories of the fighting around Smirë, Shati Hill, and the Red Bridge, and the broader engagement is commonly remembered as the "Battle of Karadak."

== Sources ==
Braha, Shaban (1981). Idriz Seferi në Lëvizjet Kombëtare Shqiptare (in Albanian). Prishtinë: Shtëpia Botuese "8 Nëntori".
