= Xhel Guri =

Albanian insurgent

- Born: Xheladin Limani; Shurdhan, Gjilan, Kosovo Vilayet, Ottoman Empire (today Kosovo)
- Died: 23 August 1927; Kurbalija, Preševo, Kingdom of Yugoslavia (today Serbia)
- Military career
- Allegiance: Kachak
- Branch: Albanian guerrilla, (Kachak)
- Rank: Commander
- Conflicts: Albanian Revolt of 1910; Albanian Revolt of 1912; First Balkan War; World War I Kachak Movement †

Xhel Guri (born Xheladin Limani) was a Kachak Albanian insurgent from the village of Shurdhan in present-day Gjilan municipality. Xhel Guri was a close companion of Idriz Seferi and later became the leader of the Albanian Kachaks in the Karadak Highlands. He was killed in battle against Yugoslav forces in the village of Kurbalija in 1927 and is considered one of the last Kachak leaders to have led armed resistance against Yugoslav authorities.

== Life ==
Xheladin Limani, also known by his nom de guerre Xhel Guri, was born in the village of Shurdhan, located in the Karadak Highlands. As a young man, Xhel Guri joined the Çeta of Idriz Seferi, where he distinguished himself during the Battle of the Kaçanik Gorge. Due to his efforts, he was called "the Golden Hand of Karadak" by Idriz Seferi himself. He remained a soldier of Idriz Seferi and later participated in a battle near Sefer, where Idriz Seferi and his men defeated a Bulgarian unit, killing 20 Bulgarian soldiers.

Following the Yugoslav annexation of Kosovo, Xhel Guri joined the Kachak movement and led Albanian Çetas in Manastir (now known as Bitola) before ultimately returning to Karadak to command his own Çeta. His unit included Kachaks such as Bexhet Runica, Lot Vaku, Ali Nikushtaku, Shaqir Tërstena, Hetë and Qazim Zeqbasha, Sali Staneci, Jusuf Baftjari, and others. The attacks launched by Xhel Guri and his Çeta later prompted the Yugoslav Army to establish a gendarmerie station in the village of Sefer, within the Karadak Highlands. The activities of Xhel Guri's Çeta were particularly notable in late 1919. During this time, clashes between the Kachaks and the Yugoslav Army intensified. Throughout 1920, frequent skirmishes were recorded between the gendarmerie, other military units, and the kachaks led by Xhel Guri. During this period, the commander of the Skopje Division issued directives to military units outlining measures for the complete disarmament of Albanians in Skopje, Preševo, and Kumanovo. The operational plan detailed the number of troops allocated for disarmament efforts in different regions. In the Kumanovo District, particularly in the Zhegligovo region, inhabited mainly by Bulgarians, 250 soldiers were assigned to oversee five municipalities. In the Preševo District, which also had five municipalities and 31 villages with a population roughly half of which were inhabited by Albanians, up to 600 soldiers were deployed.

By late 1920 and early 1921, Kachak groups in Karadak under Xhel Guri had strengthened significantly. In one instance, they advanced toward the town of Preševo. One Kachak from the Çeta, Shaqir Tërstena, entered the office of the Serbian military prefect of Preševo and took him hostage. A few months later, in mid-1921, Yugoslav authorities launched a military-police expedition to hunt down the Kachaks across Kosovo in regions such as Llap, Drenica, Shala e Bajgorës, Anamorava, and Karadak. During the operation, entire Albanian villages were burned down. Despite military and police reprisals in Karadak, the Kachak movement remained active, with the Karadak Highlands serving as a safe haven for Albanian Kachaks. On June 22, 1921, Azem Galica contacted the Çetas in Karadak to organize joint operations. In early July 1921, Xhel Guri participated in a meeting of Karadak guerrilla units, to unify their actions and strengthen the resistance. In response to the threat of a coordinated Kachak attack, Serbian military authorities formed a punitive unit, the Četnik Detachment, in Kumanovo, led by Second Lieutenant Krsto Kovačević, consisting of 40 Chetniks.

By the summer of 1924, after the assassination of Azem Galica on July 25–26, the Kachak movement began to disintegrate. By 1925, only three guerrilla units remained active: those led by Xhel Guri, Januz Topi-Strezoci, and Ibush Vuçitërnaliu, primarily operating in the Karadak Highlands and the Pristina region. In September 1926, Januz Topi's group was eliminated. Surrounded by Yugoslav gendarmerie and military forces in the village of Shurdhan in the Karadak Highlands, Januz Topi took his own life to avoid capture.

The last remaining guerrilla groups, led by Ibush Vuçitërnaliu and Xhel Guri, continued their activities until 1927. Ibush Vuçitërnaliu was reportedly killed on August 8, 1927. A few days later, on August 23, 1927, Xhel Guri was also killed in fighting with Yugoslav armed forces and Chetniks in the village of Kurbalija.
