= Lubishtë =

Lubishtë: Lubishtë (Albanian); Љубиште/Ljubište (Serbian)
- Village
- Location within Kosovo
- Coordinates: 42.2947°N 21.4117°E
- Country: Kosovo
- District: Gjilan
- Municipality: Vitina

Population (2024)
  - Total: 1,056
- Time zone: UTC+1 (CET)
  - Summer (DST): UTC+2 (CEST)

Lubishtë (Albanian: Lubishtë, Serbian: Љубиште) is a village in the municipality of Vitia, Kosovo.

== Geography ==
The village is located on the slopes of the Karadak Mountain range.

== History ==
All the villagers belong to the Sopi tribe and are divided into five clans (Mahalla). They descend from Albanian settlers who originally came from the village of Lubizhdë near Prizren in the 1730s. According to an Ottoman defter from 1901, Lubishtë had a population of 426, all of whom were of the Islamic faith. Lubishtë was part of the Karadak nahija within the Kaza of Gjilan. During the Albanian revolt of 1910, Idriz Seferi recruited fighters from Lubishtë, including Zejnë Lubishta, who took part in the Battle of the Kaçanik Pass. After the Albanian revolt of 1910, the Karadak nahija was dissolved to disrupt the organization of Albanian rebels in the region. Following its dissolution, Lubishtë became part of the Nahija of Upper Morava and served as its seat. During the First Balkan War, Zejnë Lubishta, from the village, led Albanian Kachaks against the Serbian Army in Karadak. In the following months villages in Karadak, including Lubishtë, were targeted by the Serbian Army. According to reports, most of Lubishtë's population was massacred. In November 1912, 18 or 19 people were massacred in the village. On February 15, 1913, the Serbian Army carried out another massacre, killing 68 Albanians in Lubishtë. During World War II and the Karadak Insurgency, Ballist fighters from Lubishtë, led by Mustafë Uka, conducted military operations in the region and participated in the First Battle of Preševo. During the Kosovo War, in April 1999, Yugoslav forces launched an offensive against several villages in Viti, including Lubishtë. On April 5, Serbian paramilitaries attacked the village, in the following battle, five KLA fighters were killed in action. According to U.S. reports, at least 20 Albanians were executed in Lubishtë.

== Notable people ==
- Rashit Mustafa, KLA commander.
