= Mulla Sinan Maxhera =

Albanian imam and rebel

Mullah Sinan Maxhera
- Born: 1863 Mađare, Kaza of Gjilan, Ottoman Empire
- Died: 7 July 1910 (aged 46–47) Kaçanik, Ottoman Empire
- Cause of death: Execution by Hanging
- Battles / wars: Greco-Turkish War of 1897 (WIA); Albanian revolt of 1910 †; Battle of Kaçanik Pass; Battle of Komogllava; Battle of Drenogllava
- Alma mater: Isa Beg Madrasa of Skopje

Mulla Sinan Maxhera (1863 – 7 July 1910), was an Albanian imam and rebel against the Ottoman Empire. He is most known for his participation in the Albanian Revolt of 1910, where he served as a rebel leader and the right-hand man of Idriz Seferi, for which he was later executed and hanged by the Young Turks.

== Life ==
Sinan Maxhera was born in 1863 in the village of Mađare, in present-day Preševo, located in the Karadak region. At that time, the village belonged to the Karadak nahiya of the kaza of Gjilan. He first studied under the local imam in his village before continuing his education at the Isa Beg Madrasa in Skopje. He later completed university studies in Istanbul.

At a young age, Maxhera participated in the League of Prizren Assembly.

He enlisted as a volunteer soldier in the Greco-Turkish War of 1897, where he was wounded in battle. After returning to Karadak, he served as a local imam in the villages of Caravajka, Pogragjë, and Dobërçan. During his time as an imam, Maxhera mediated blood feuds in Karadak. Around the same time, he befriended Idriz Seferi, who made him his right-hand man and commander in his campaigns against the Young Turks.

In 1910, Idriz Seferi and Maxhera initiated a revolt against the Young Turks. Maxhera participated as a commander in the Battle of Kaçanik and the Battle of Komogllava, in which Albanian rebels were ultimately defeated. However, just a few days later, Seferi and Maxhera, along with other commanders such as Isa Boletini, defeated the Ottoman army in the Karadak mountains during the Battle of Drenogllava. Nevertheless, the revolt was eventually crushed by the Young Turks.

After quelling the uprising, the Ottoman army captured and arrested Maxhera. He and six other rebels were sentenced to death by hanging by an Ottoman court. Maxhera was hanged in Kaçanik on July 7, 1910; however, according to historian Shaban Braha, he was executed in Kukës (in modern-day Albania).

== Folklore ==
Maxhera is a frequent subject of Albanian folk songs in Karadak regarding the Albanian Revolt of 1910.

Albanian
Sinan Hoxha n`luftë po thërret

Sot me lind ja me vdek

Sinan Aga lyp atkisë

I kthenë shpinën kësaj Turkisë

Ky Kostrani veç po dridhet

Hoxhë Sinani nuk po lidhet

Sinan Hoxha len koranin

Ka marr pushkën e xhamadanin.

English
Imam Sinan calls to war

Today either he is born or he dies

Sinan Aga asks for his horse

He turns his back on the Turks

The Kostrani is trembling

But Imam Sinan does not yield

Imam Sinan leaves his Quran

He has taken up the rifle and his vest
