= Kadri Breza =

Albanian freedom fighter

Kadri Bazi Breza
- Born: c.1880 Brezë, Karadak Vilayet of Kosovo
- Died: 1943; Karadak
- Occupations: Freedom fighter, guerrilla fighter
- Known for: Participation in the Battle of Kaçanik; Armed resistance against Serbian army in 1912

Kadri Bazi Breza (1880–1943) was an Albanian Kachak, and freedom fighter during the Albanian National Awakening. He is known for beheading Serbian officer Bašić.

== Life ==
=== Early life ===
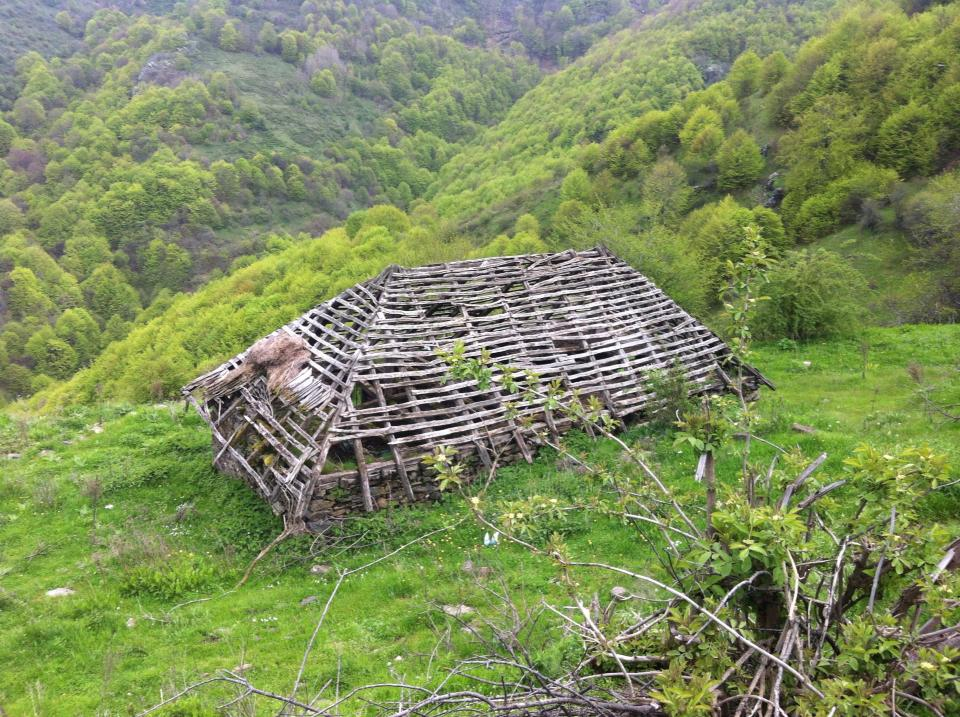
The barn of Kadri Breza in Brezë

Kadri Bazi Breza was an ethnic Albanian, born in the village Brezë, located in the Karadak region. Kadri Bazi was the son of Abaz Breza, and had three Brothers. Kadri Breza began his life as a merchant, active in the old bazaars of Skopje, which were then part of the Ottoman Empire. On one occasion, a Serbian priest in the Old Bazaar of Skopje harassed two Muslim Albanian women from Matejče. The priest stripped the clothes off the two women and started beating them with a whip. The following day, upon learning of the incident, Kadri Breza tracked down the Serbian priest and killed him by firing six bullets into his head.

=== Life as a Kachak ===
Before the First Balkan War, he participated in the Battle of Kaçanik and the Capture of Skopje by Albanian troops during the Albanian Uprising of 1912. During the First Balkan War, Kadri Breza, alongside Idriz Seferi and others such as Sulë Hotla, participated in the Battle of Kumanovo. Kadri Breza, in particular, fought on the Tabanovce front, where he encountered the forces of Radomir Putnik. During the battle, the Ottomans accidentally fired their artillery shells at the Albanians defending Tabanovce instead of attacking Serbian forces. The accidental friendly fire is also said to have damaged the old Tabanovce mosque. Nevertheless, after suffering heavy casualties from the friendly fire, the Albanian Kachaks had to retreat. Idriz Seferi, while trying to withdraw, was also captured by the Serbian Army. Kadri Breza managed to escape and returned to his home village of Brezë afterwards. In 1913, Serbian forces captured Villages in the Karadak region, under them Kadri Breza's village. During that time a Serbian officer named Bašić with his unit composing of 300 men committed murders in the village, it was there when Bašić wanted to rape a local girl. Kadri Breza heard the cries for help by the local girl and armed with a axe approached the Serbian commander, beheading him in front of all his men. Surprised by this, the entire Serbian unit fled the village. Kadri Breza then went into hiding in the mountains, where he was never caught by the Serbian Authorities.

== Legacy ==
In Karadak Kadri Bazi Breza is celebrated as a hero, who defended the Honour of the Albanians.

A Monument to him is located in his home village of Brezë.

The Hasanbeg-Aračinovo road is named after him.
