= Skopska Crna Gora =

Mountain range in southeastern Europe

- Macedonian and Serbian: Скопска Црна Гора, Skopska Crna Gora; Albanian: Mali i Zi i Shkupit / Malet e Karadakut; Turkish: Karadağ
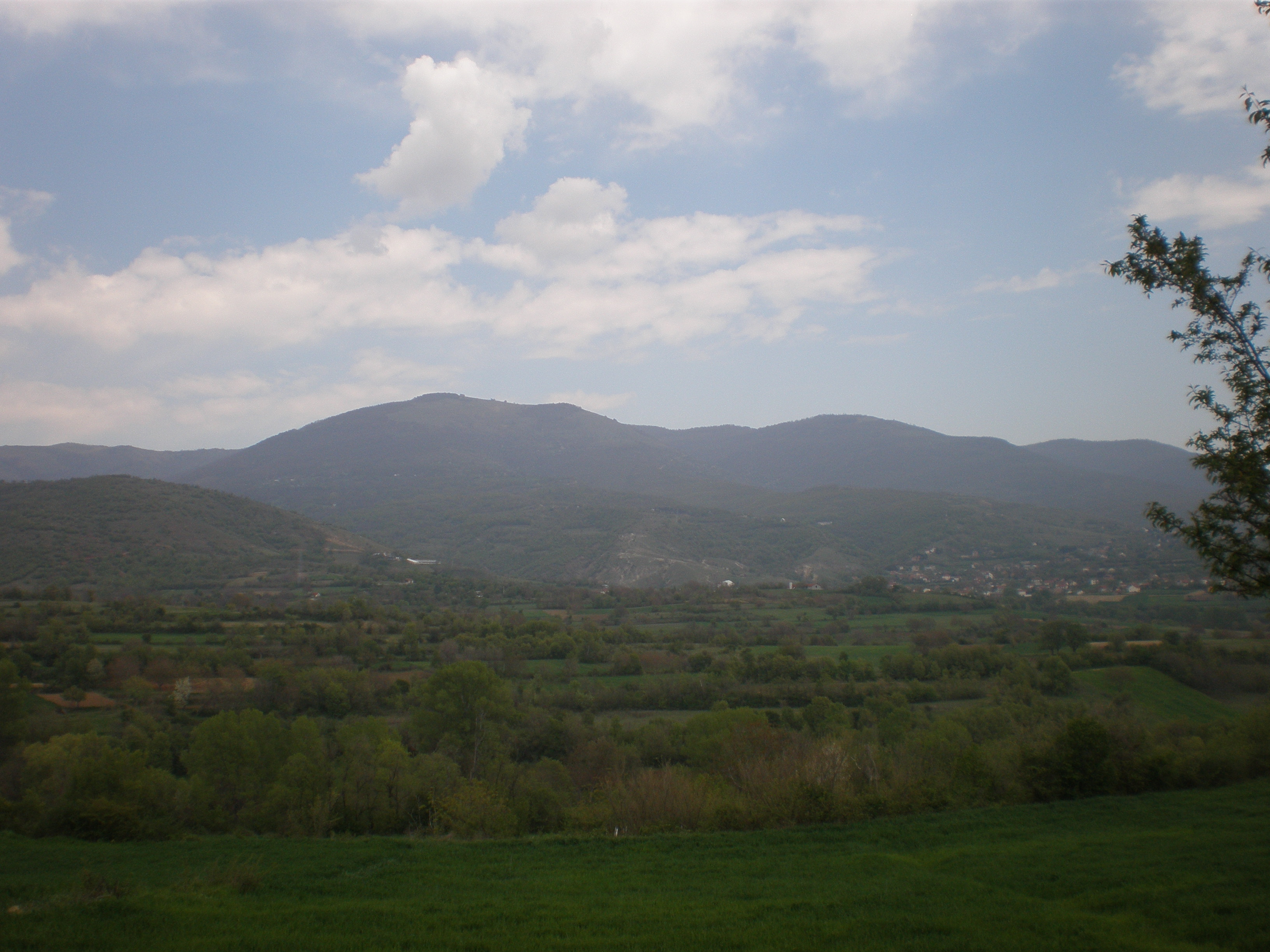

Highest point
- Peak: Ramno
- Elevation: 1,651 m (5,417 ft)
- Prominence: 1,087 m (3,566 ft)
- Listing: Ribu
- Coordinates: 42°11′24″N 21°26′24″E

Geography
- Location within North Macedonia
- Location: North Macedonia; Kosovo; Serbia

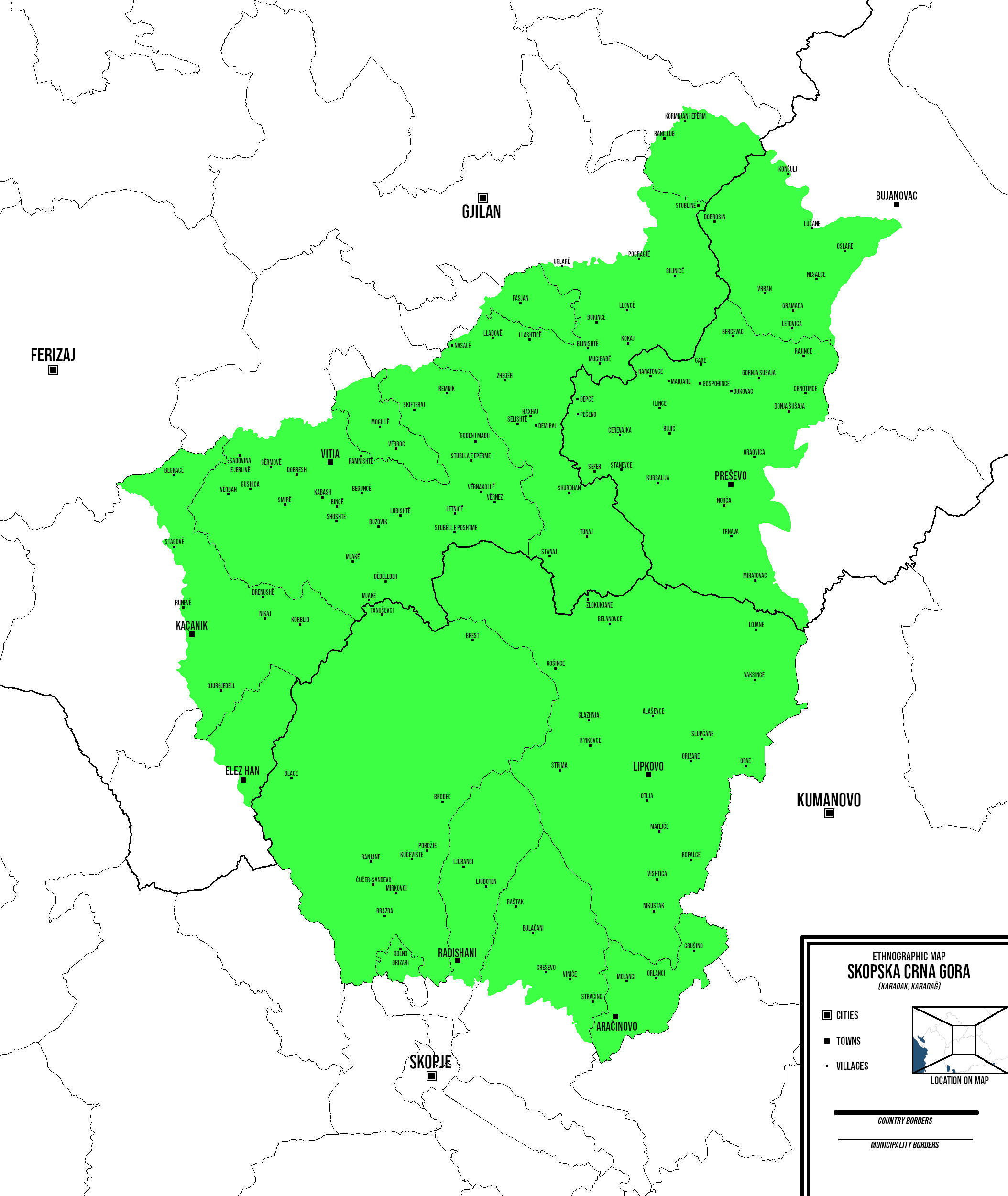
Skopska Crna Gora location

Skopska Crna Gora or Karadak Mountains (Macedonian and Serbian: Скопска Црна Гора, pronounced [skôpskaː tsr̩̂ːnaː ɡǒra]; Albanian: Malësia e Karadakut), often called simply Crna Gora (Macedonian and Serbian: Црна Гора; Albanian: Mali i Zi), is a mountain range and ethnographic region in North Macedonia, Kosovo, and Serbia. The highest peak is Ramno 1,651 m (5,417 ft) in North Macedonia. The largest settlement on the mountain is the village of Kučevište in North Macedonia.

== Name ==
Skopska Crna Gora is also known as Karadak (from earlier Turkish: Karadağ – "Black Mountain"; Macedonian and Serbian: Карадаг; Albanian: Karadak), which appeared after the Ottoman conquest of the region.

== Geography ==
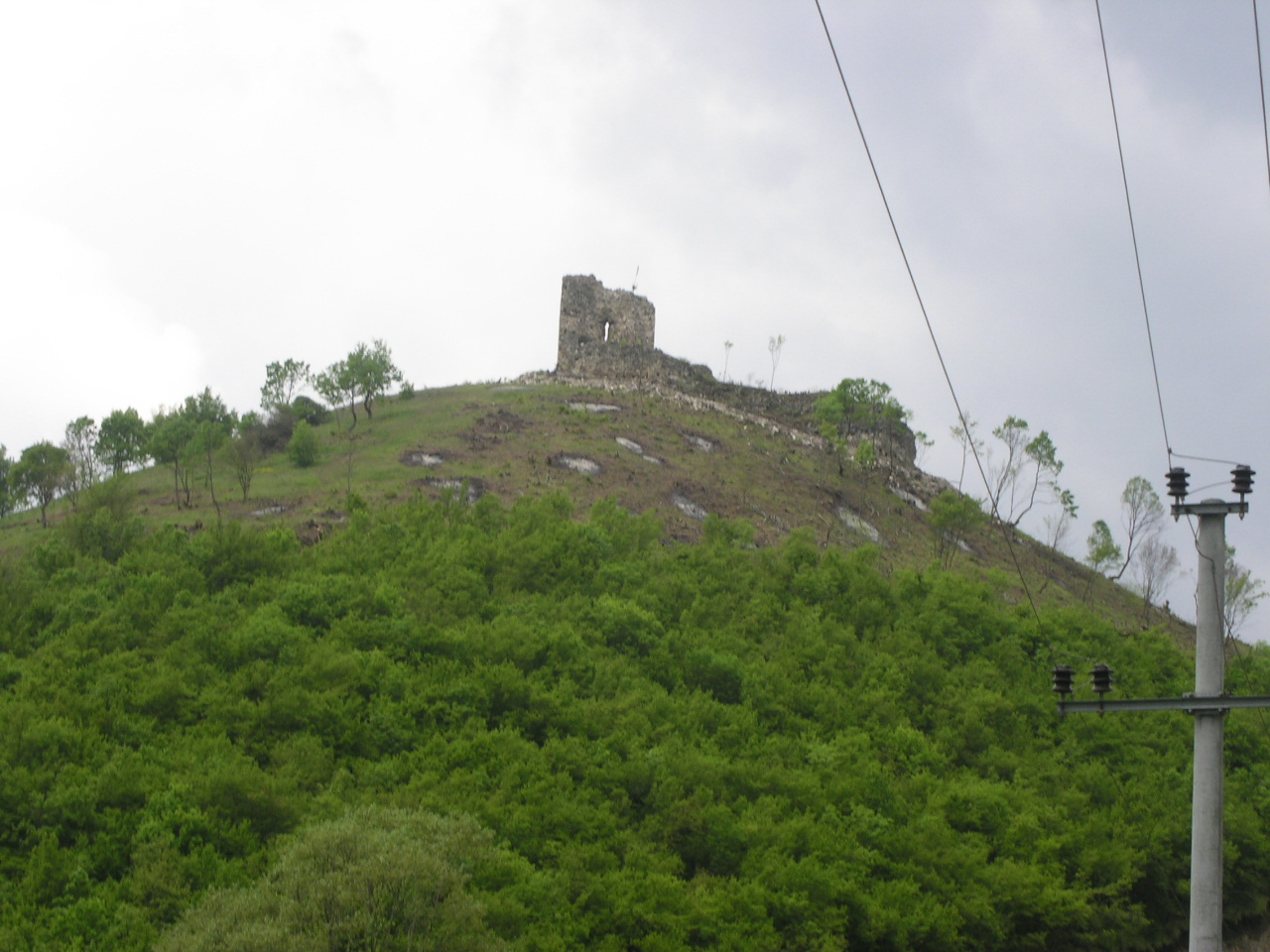
Pogragja Castle (Gjilan), in the northernmost point of the Skopska Crna Gora region

Skopska Crna Gora extends from the Kaçanik Gorge to the west - to Preševska Moravica and the Gorge of Končulj in the east. In the north, it stretches from Binačka Morava to Aračinovo in the south. The relief structure is fragmented due to the rivers of the region which descend from high points and carry eroded material. Additionally, the geological composition of the region is complicated as there are new sediments in the west, Mesozoic layers in the middle and old Palaeozoic layers in the east. The most important rivers are Letnica, Golemareka, Karadak, Pasjani, Lashtica, and Llapushnica. 31% of the region consists of arable land, whereas 11% consists of pastures and meadows. Due to the lack of nutrition available, the keeping of livestock is limited. Skopska Crna Gora consists of high mountain peaks ranging from 700–1,650m. The mountains covers around 389 km^{2} (150 sq mi) and consist of around 50,000 inhabitants, with a density of about 120 per km.

Municipalities that lie in the region include:

Kosovo:

Kaçanik, Viti, Elez Han, Gjilan, Ranilug, Parteš, Klokot

Serbia:

Bujanovac, Preševo

North Macedonia:

Čučer-Sandevo, Lipkovo, Aračinovo, Butel, Gazi Baba

== History ==
=== Middle Ages ===
It is not known since when this area is called by its current name, however it was first mentioned in the 13th century when the Tsar Konstantin Tih left the villages in his endowment. The name was mentioned again in 1300, in the charter of King Milutin in the Church of Saint George in Skopje. After the Ottoman conquest of Skopje, the name was translated into Kara-Dag, which is used until this day.

=== Ottoman period ===
During the Ottoman period the region remained out of the reach of the regular Ottoman civil administration. The Kosovar part of the region was turned into a nahiya by the Ottomans and was named Karatonlu, while the Macedonian part was turned into a Kaza and was named Karadak. In this period many Albanian Clans (vllazni) settled in the region, thus around 8-10% of the Albanian population belonged to the Berisha tribe, while descendants of the Krasniqi tribe settled in the villages of Gošince, Slupčane, Alaševce and Runica. There are also members of the Mirdita and Sopi tribes which settled in the region.

The Ottoman defter recorded statistics for the Kaza of Karadak in 1831. There were 4,282 males, of which 2,722 were Muslims, 1452 Christians, and 108 Roma gypsies. The general population is therefore estimated to have consisted of 8,564 people, including 5,444 Muslim Albanians, 2,904 Christians (mainly Albanians and Bulgarians) and 216 Roma gypsies.

Following Tanzimat reforms in 1839 and the sacking of local pashas, Albanians from Skopska Crna Gora and Šar, led by Dervish Cara, revolted in Aračinovo. In January 1844 the rebels captured Gostivar and Tetovo. In February 1844 the rebels attacked and captured the whole region, including the towns of Skopje, Kumanovo, Preševo, Bujanovac, Vranje and Leskovac. A National Council led by Dervish Cara was created, but the revolt was ultimately suppressed by the Ottomans, led by Hayredin Pasha in the summer of 1844.

During the mid-1800s, Catholic Albanians were expelled by Ottoman authorities.

During the Albanian revolt of 1910, Albanian fighters from Skopska Crna Gora under the command of Idriz Seferi rebelled against the Ottomans and managed to defeat them in the Battle of Kaçanik. In 1912, the Albanians rebelled again and managed to capture Skopje.

=== Modern history ===
The region became part of the Kingdom of Serbia after the First Balkan War. Following this the region became a battleground between the Serbian forces supported by Chetniks and Albanian Kachaks under Idriz Seferi and Ajet Sopi Bllata as well as the Macedonian IMRO insurgents. The region was occupied by the Kingdom of Bulgaria during the First World War and became part of the newly established Kingdom of Serbs, Croats and Slovenes after it ended.

During the Interwar period many Serb colonizers settled in the region

After the Invasion of Yugoslavia in 1941 the region was given to the Kingdom of Bulgaria, which resulted in Albanian resistance led by Mulla Idriz Gjilani. The Karadak Uprising was later mostly quelled by Bulgaria and the Yugoslav partisan forces after the Stracin–Kumanovo and Kosovo Operation, but low intense fighting under the command of Hasan Ali Remniku continued until 1951.

During the Yugoslav Wars, Serb separatists supported by the FR Yugoslavia sought to create a Serbian breakaway State named "Karadak republic" in the region.

From 1998 to 1999, during the Kosovo War the "Karadak Operational Zone" (which also included large parts of the Anamorava region) of the Kosovo Liberation Army (KLA) remained inactive, thus the region saw less fighting than other parts of Kosovo. From 1999 to 2001, during the insurgency in the Preševo Valley and the insurgency in Macedonia the Serbian and Macedonian parts of the region became major strongholds of the Albanian insurgent organizations National Liberation Army (NLA) and Liberation Army of Preševo, Medveđa and Bujanovac (LAPMB).

== Culture ==
The ethnic Albanians of Skopska Crna Gora have a dialect of their own, which in itself is a north-eastern extremity of central Gheg Albanian. The dialect borders on the verge of north-eastern Gheg Albanian.

The Macedonian and Serbian populations of the region speak the Skopska Crna Gora dialect, a subdialect of Torlakian.

== Notable people ==
- Idriz Seferi, Albanian patriot and freedom fighter
- Agim Ramadani, Albanian commander of the KLA
- Njazi Azemi, Albanian commander of the KLA and LAPMB
- Arben Ramadani, Albanian commander of the KLA and LAPMB
- Ismet Jashari, Albanian commander of the KLA
- Xhezair Shaqiri, Albanian commander of the KLA and NLA
- Beqir Sadiku, Albanian commander of the KLA and NLA
- Nazmi Sulejmani, Albanian commander of the NLA
- Kadri Breza, Albanian freedom fighter
- Rashit Mustafa, Albanian commander of the KLA
- Jonuz Zejnullahu, Albanian Imam and soldier of the KLA known for blowing himself up during the Battle of Koshare
- Jusuf Baftjari, Albanian Mullah and Ballist commander
- Mulla Sinan Maxhera, Albanian Mullah and rebel
- Xheladin Kurbaliu, Albanian Ballist commander and former Partisan
- Jakup Asipi, Albanian Mullah and commander of the NLA
- Lutfi Haziri, political leader of the "ZO Karadak" of the KLA
- Sulë Hotla, Albanian Ballist commander
- Avdil Jakupi, Albanian commander of the Albanian National Army, member of LAPMB and NLA
- Harun Aliu, co-founder of the NLA
- Xhel Guri, Albanian Commander during the Kachak Movement
- Xhemail Rexhepi, Albanian commander of the NLA
- Lavdrim Muhaxheri, Albanian ISIL commander
- Toma Raspasani, Albanian Catholic priest and freedom fighter
- Arif Hiqmeti, commander during the Islamic Revolt in Albania
- Taxhedin Bislimi, Albanian Imam
- Johan Tarčulovski, war criminal, former police commander and politician
- Triumf Riza, Albanian policeman
- Shemsi Beqiri, Albanian kickboxer and World champion
- Petar Mandzhukov, revolutionary and anarchist
- Nathanael of Ohrid, cleric, writer, and revolutionary
- Riza Halimi, Albanian politician
- Marko Sopi, Albanian Catholic prelate
- Ali Aliu, Albanian activist
- Limon Staneci, Albanian politician, journalist and military leader of Balli Kombëtar
- Xherdan Shaqiri, Swiss footballer of Albanian origin
- Nijazi Ramadani, Albanian poet
- Shaban Sejdiu, Macedonian-Albanian wrestler
- Shqiprim Arifi, mayor of Preševo
- Beqir Musliu, Albanian poet

== See also ==
- List of mountains in North Macedonia
- Anamorava
- Gollak

== Sources ==
- "Skopska Crna Gora", Srpski etnografski zbornik, VI, Belgrade, 1905
