= March of Shkup =

- Skopje after being captured by Albanian revolutionaries in August, 1912, who defeated the Ottoman forces holding the city

Song
- Language: Albanian
- Written: 1912
- Songwriter: Unknown

The March of Shkup (Shkup is the Albanian name for Skopje) is an Albanian folk song composed in 1912, when Albanian revolutionaries captured the city of Skopje from the Ottomans after more than 500 years of Ottoman rule.

== History ==
In July 1912 Albanian revolutionaries gathered their forces in Kosovo after capturing most major cities of the region like Pristina, Ferizoviç (Ferizaj) and Yakova (Gjakova) from the Ottoman Empire. In early August 1912, Albanian soldiers marched southwards towards the capital of the province Üsküb (Skopje). On August 13 the first Albanian soldiers, five hundred under Idriz Seferi and Isa Boletini entered the city and demanded that the 4,000 Ottoman soldiers of the city surrender it to the Albanian revolutionaries. On August 14, the Ottoman garrison surrendered, while more Albanian troops reached the city from the areas of Kumanovo, Pristina and Debar. By the end of August, more than 30,000 Albanian troops were stationed in Skopje.

== Song ==
The song March of Shkup was first performed by one of the Albanian Catholic bands — possibly the band of Gjakova — that marched towards Skopje in August 1912. When the Albanians entered the city on August 14, Albanian language newspapers and magazines like Drita reported that March of Shkup was sung by a large part of the soldiers. The song is a call to arms to all Albanians to join the Albanian uprising of 1912 that led to the establishment of the state of Albania.

== Lyrics ==
Part of the lyrics:

Albanian

Ngri, Shqyptar flamurin!
Tash n'luft' boria na thrret;
Me derdh për vend tonë gjakun,
Na pushka po na pret.

English

Raise Albanian the flag!
Now to war the command calls us;
To shed blood for our land,
The weapons await us.

== See also ==
- Albanian Revolt of 1912
