= Brest attack =

- Part of the 2001 insurgency in Macedonia
Date	9 March 2001
Location	Brest, Čučer-Sandevo, Macedonia
Result	NLA victory
Territorial changes	NLA captures Molino and Brest

Belligerents
National Liberation Army	Macedonia

Commanders and leaders
Xhezair Shaqiri; Nazmi Sulejmani	Ljube Boškoski; Refet Elmazi; Aleksandar Dončev

Units involved
113th Brigade "Ismet Jashari"	Ministry of Interior; Macedonian Police; Special Support Unit; Macedonian Army; Special Operations Regiment

Strength
30+ militants (police estimate)	100 policemen

Casualties and losses
1 militant killed	1 policemen killed

The National Liberation Army (NLA) launched an attack near the village of Brest on 9 March 2001 during the insurgency in Macedonia. The NLA ambushed a Macedonian convoy, after they were defeated and forced to withdraw by KFOR troops in the village of Tanuševci.

== Attack ==
After the Tanuševci operation, a Macedonian police convoy was sent to establish presence near the border to Kosovo and to try to prevent an Albanian insurgency by the NLA from taking hold in the area, but found itself trapped in an ambush by the NLA in 9 March. The officials trapped were deputy interior minister Refet Elmazi, state secretary of the ministry of internal affairs Ljube Boškoski and Macedonian police general Aleksandar Dončev. According to Macedonian police estimates, there were around 30 insurgents. Immediately after the ambush an hour-long battle involving artillery and heavy mortars erupted, after which most of the Macedonian convoy managed to escape. The fighting left one dead from the Macedonian security forces. After the firefight the NLA established control in Molino and Brest and the insurgency spread to wider parts of the country.

== Aftermath ==
While the Macedonian convoy was able to break through the ambush, they were forced to seal off the village. The NLA took control of Molino and Brest, and the insurgency spread to wider parts in Macedonia.

According to the Macedonian Ministry of Internal Affairs, the main motive behind the attack by the NLA was their resentment over the Ministry's establishment of cooperation with the local population, among whom there were those who volunteered to work in the planned reserve police stations.
