= Rashit Mustafa =

Kosovan military commander

- Born: August 20, 1964; Lubishtë, Viti, AP Kosovo, SFR Yugoslavia
- Died: June 10, 1999 (aged 34)
- Military career
- Allegiance: Croatia; FARK; Kosovo Liberation Army
- Rank: Commander
- Commands: 138th Brigade "Agim Ramadani"; Garda Profesionale "Skenderbeu"
- Conflicts: Croatian War of Independence Kosovo War: Battle of Košare

Rashit Mustafa (August 20, 1964 – June 10, 1999) was an Albanian commander of the Kosovo Liberation Army (KLA), he is best known for leading the Special Unit "Skanderbeg'' (Garda profesionale "Skenderbeu'' in Albanian) of the 138th Brigade of the KLA. During the war, he had the nickname "Komandant Karadaku" (Commander Karadak in English).

== Biography ==
Mustafa was born in the village of Lubishtë, in the Karadak Highlands of Viti.

During the Croatian War of Independence, he joined the HVO in their fight against the Yugoslav forces. He would stay in Croatia until the End of the War. 3 years later he would join the FARK forces, which were fighting for Kosovar Independence. Following the end of the War in Croatia, he was pursued by the Hague Tribunal for a significant number of killings, allegedly committed against Serbian paramilitary forces. The exact number remains debated, but some sources suggest it exceeded 100. Reports also indicate that Croatian forces facilitated the exchange of 192 Serbian prisoners of war, for Rashit Mustafa, who had been captured by the Serbs. Additionally, Rashit Mustafa has been associated with various war crimes, including an alleged incident involving the killings of a Serbian Orthodox priest, along with 32 other Serbs, accused of aiding Serbian forces.

Due to his experience as a soldier in Croatia, he proved to be an excellent fighter during the Kosovo war, this led to him being appointed as the Leader of the Special Unit "Skanderbeg'' (Garda profesionale "Skenderbeu'' in Albanian) of the 138th Brigade "Agim Ramadani" of the KLA. With his Unit he participated in many Attacks and battes along the Yugoslav-Albanian Border, most notably the Battle of Košare.

== Death ==
On 31 May 1999, 11 days before the end of the Kosovo war, he still had in contact with his family, before disappearing for six years. He is believed to be the victim of a political murder of the LDK-PDK rivalry On 28 June 2005, his body was discovered by civilians in Gjakova.
