= Sokolica Monastery =

Serbian Orthodox monastery near Zvečan, Kosovo

Sokolica Monastery Манастир Соколица
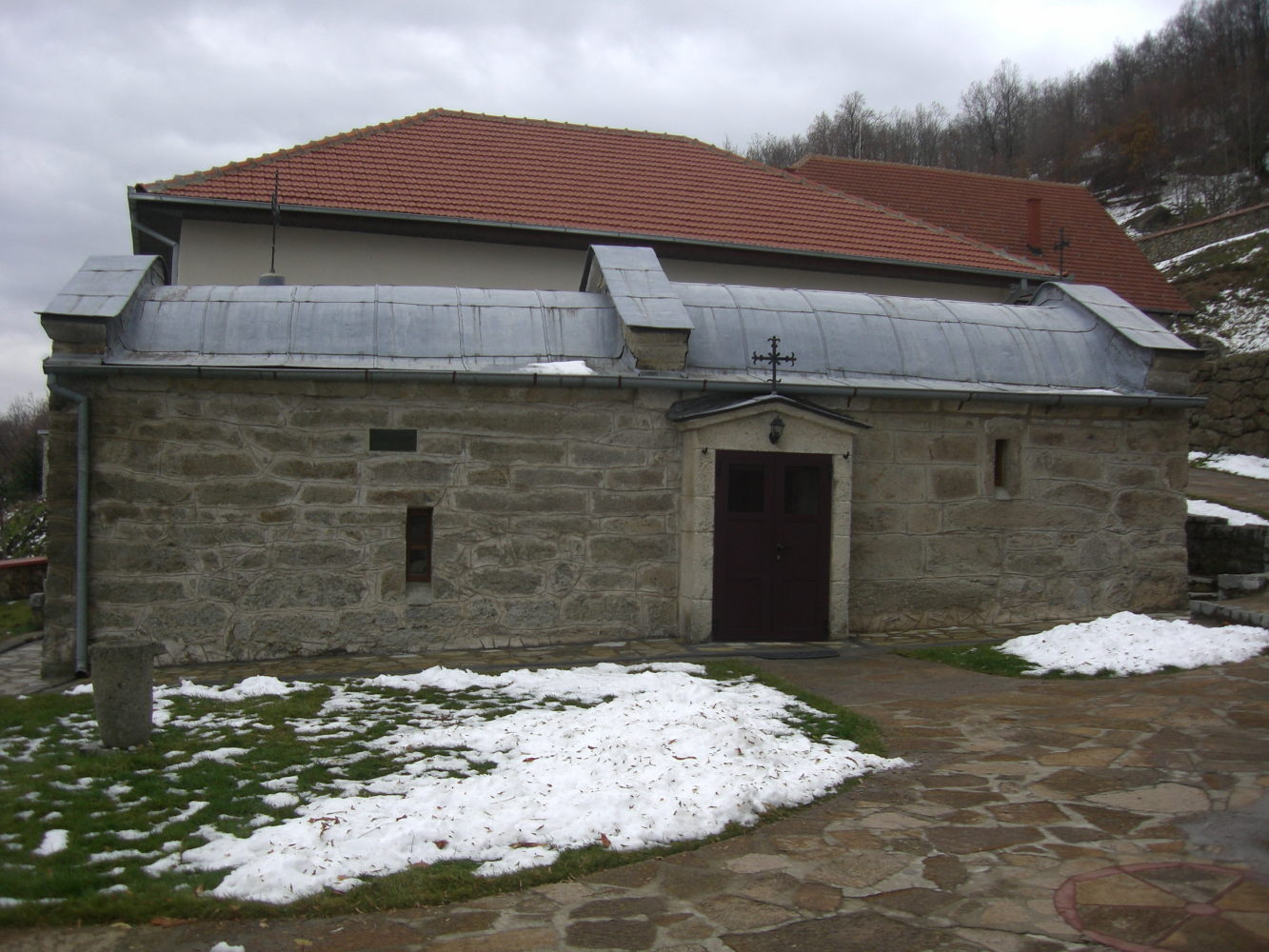
- Interactive map of Sokolica Monastery; Манастир Соколица

Monastery information
- Full name: Манастир - Соколица
- Order: Serbian Orthodox
- Established: 14th century
- Dedication: Assumption of Mary

People
- Founder: leader Musa

Site
- Location: Boletin
- Coordinates: 42.9272°N 20.8627°E
- Public access: Yes

The Sokolica Monastery is located in the village of Boletin, on the territory of the municipality of Zvečan, in Kosovo. It belongs to the Eparchy of Raška and Prizren of the Serbian Orthodox Church. As a whole, it represents an immovable cultural asset as a cultural monument of exceptional importance.

== History ==
The monastery was most likely built at the beginning of the 14th century by the leader Musa, lord of Zvečan and son-in-law of Prince Lazar. The monastery was built on a hill in whose forests, for centuries, falcons built their nests. Hence its name - Sokolovo brdo, and the monastery Sokolica. In the Middle Ages, hunting without falcons was unthinkable, and tradition says that every householder here, for his lord, had to breed as many falcons as he had sons. During World War II, the Sokolica Monastery was looted by Albanians.

== Architecture ==
The monastery church is a building of small dimensions, with a spacious narthex added later, and a bell tower was built between the two wars. It is built of skillfully worked stone, with a shallow apse, vaulted in a semi-circular shape. On the facades, especially the northern one, there are primitive drawings of people and animals, as well as old records. A severely damaged painting from the period of Turkish rule has preserved several representations: Christ Pantokrator in the vault, Assumption of the Virgin Mary on the western wall, Adoration of the archbishop in the apse. On the south wall are visible fragments of figures dressed in lay clothes, which are thought to represent the founders. Three old and valuable books are kept in the church: the Russian Psalter from the 17th century, "Zavomaje ogledalo" in Bulgarian from 1816, and the Prayer Book from 1838. The restoration and conservation of the architecture was carried out in 1995/96. The new inn was built in the eighties of this century.

== See also ==
- List of Serbian Orthodox monasteries
