= Gošince =

Gošince Гошинце Goshincë
- Village
- Location within North Macedonia
- Coordinates: 42°13′N 21°30′E
- Country: North Macedonia
- Region: Southeastern
- Municipality: Lipkovo

Population (2021)
  - Total: 167
- Time zone: UTC+1 (CET)
  - Summer (DST): UTC+2 (CEST)
- Car plates: KU
- Website: .

Gošince (Macedonian: Гошинце, Albanian: Goshincë) is a village in the municipality of Lipkovo, North Macedonia.

== History ==
Descendants of the Krasniqi fis were recorded in the villages of Gošince, Slupčane, Alaševce and Runica in 1965.

== Demographics ==
As of the 2021 census, Gošince had 167 residents with the following ethnic composition:

- Albanians 92
- Persons for whom data are taken from administrative sources 75

According to the 2002 census, the village had a total of 424 inhabitants. Ethnic groups in the village include:

- Albanians 420
- Bosniaks 1
- Others 3
