= Dobërçan =

Dobërçan: Dobërçan (Albanian); Добрчане/Dobrčane (Serbian)
- Village
- Location within Kosovo
- Coordinates: 42.473174°N 21.571393°E
- Location: Kosovo
- District: Gjilan
- Municipality: Gjilan

Population (2024)
  - Total: 2,058
- Time zone: UTC+1 (Central European Time)
  - Summer (DST): UTC+2 (CEST)

Dobërçan is a village in the District of Gjilan, Kosovo. It is located east of Gjilan.
