= Battle of Carraleva Pass =

Battle during the 1910 Albanian revolt

- Part of Albanian revolt of 1910
Date	8 May – 11 May 1910
Location	Carraleva Pass, Kosovo Vilayet, Ottoman Empire
Result	Ottoman victory

Belligerents
Albanian rebels	Ottoman Empire

Commanders and leaders
Isa Boletini; Idriz Seferi	Shevket Turgut Pasha

Strength
8,000	20,000

Casualties and losses
Heavy	Heavy

The Battle of Carraleva Pass (Albanian: Beteja e Carralevës) was a battle between Albanian rebels and Ottoman forces during the Albanian revolt of 1910. Shevket Turgut Pasha launched an attack against Albanian rebels who were blocking the Carraleva Pass. After three days of fighting, the Albanian rebels repelled the Ottoman army. After the initial battle, the Ottoman army, aided by local Serbs who knew a shortcut over the mountains, nearly encircled the Albanian rebels in Carraleva. Although the rebels managed to escape, many were killed, imprisoned, or interned.

== Background ==
In 1910 the Young Turk Ottoman government imposed new centralization policies in Albania, which resulted in the Albanian revolt of 1910. The Rebels were supported by the Kingdom of Serbia. New taxes levied in the early months of 1910 led to Isa Boletini's activity to convince Albanian leaders who had already been involved in a 1909 uprising to try another revolt against the Ottoman Empire. The Albanian attacks on the Ottomans in Priştine (now Pristina) and Ferizovik (now Ferizaj), the killing of the Ottoman commander in İpek (now Peja), and the insurgents blocking of the railway to Skopje at the Kaçanik Pass led to the Ottoman government's declaration of martial law in the area.

Days before the Battle in the Carraleva Pass, the Albanians were defeated in the Battle of Kaçanik Pass.

== Aftermath ==
After the Battle, Turkish forces entered Prizren in the middle of May 1910. They proceeded to Gjakova and Peja where they entered on June 1, 1910. By government orders part of the force proceeded in the direction of Shkodër, while another column marched toward the Debre region (now known as Dibër in Albania, and Debar in the Republic of North Macedonia). The first column marching to Scutari managed to capture the Morinë pass, after fighting with the Albanian tribal forces of the Gashi, Krasniqi and Bytyqi areas, led by Zeqir Halili, Abdulla Hoxha, and Shaban Binaku. Ottoman forces were stopped for more than 20 days in the Agri Pass, from the Albanian forces of Shalë, Shoshë, Nikaj and Mërtur areas, led by Prel Tuli, Mehmet Shpendi, and Marash Delia. Unable to repress their resistance, this column took another way to Shkodër, passing from the Pukë region. On July 24, 1910, Ottoman forces entered the city of Shkodër. During this period martial courts were put in action and summary executions took place. A large number of firearms were collected and many villages and properties were burned by the Ottoman army.

== See also ==
- Albanian revolt of 1912
- Malësor tribes revolt of 1917

== Sources ==
- Akçam, Taner (2004), From empire to republic: Turkish nationalism and the Armenian genocide, Zed Books, ISBN 978-1-84277-527-1
- Elsie, Robert (2004), Historical dictionary of Kosova, Scarecrow Press, ISBN 978-0-8108-5309-6
- Finkel, Caroline (2006), Osman's dream: the story of the Ottoman Empire, 1300–1923, Basic Books, ISBN 978-0-465-02396-7
- Frashëri, Kristo (1984), Historia e popullit shqiptar në katër vëllime (in Albanian), vol. II, Tiranë, OCLC 255273594
- Gawrych, George Walter (2006), The crescent and the eagle: Ottoman rule, Islam and the Albanians, 1874–1913, I.B.Tauris, ISBN 978-1-84511-287-5
- Jelavich, Barbara (1983), History of the Balkans: Twentieth century, Cambridge University Press, ISBN 978-0-521-27459-3
- Malcolm, Noel (1998), Kosovo: A Short History, New York University Press, ISBN 0814755984
- Pearson, Owen (2004), Albania and King Zog: independence, republic and monarchy 1908–1939, I.B.Tauris, ISBN 978-1-84511-013-0
- Karpat, Kemal (3 May 2001), The Politicization of Islam: Reconstructing Identity, State, Faith, and Community in the Late Ottoman State, Oxford University Press, ISBN 978-0-19-028576-0
- Bloxham, Donald (2005), The Great Game of Genocide: Imperialism, Nationalism, and the Destruction of the Ottoman Armenians, OUP Oxford, ISBN 978-0-19-150044-2
