= Kosovo during World War I =

History of Kosovo 1914 - 1918

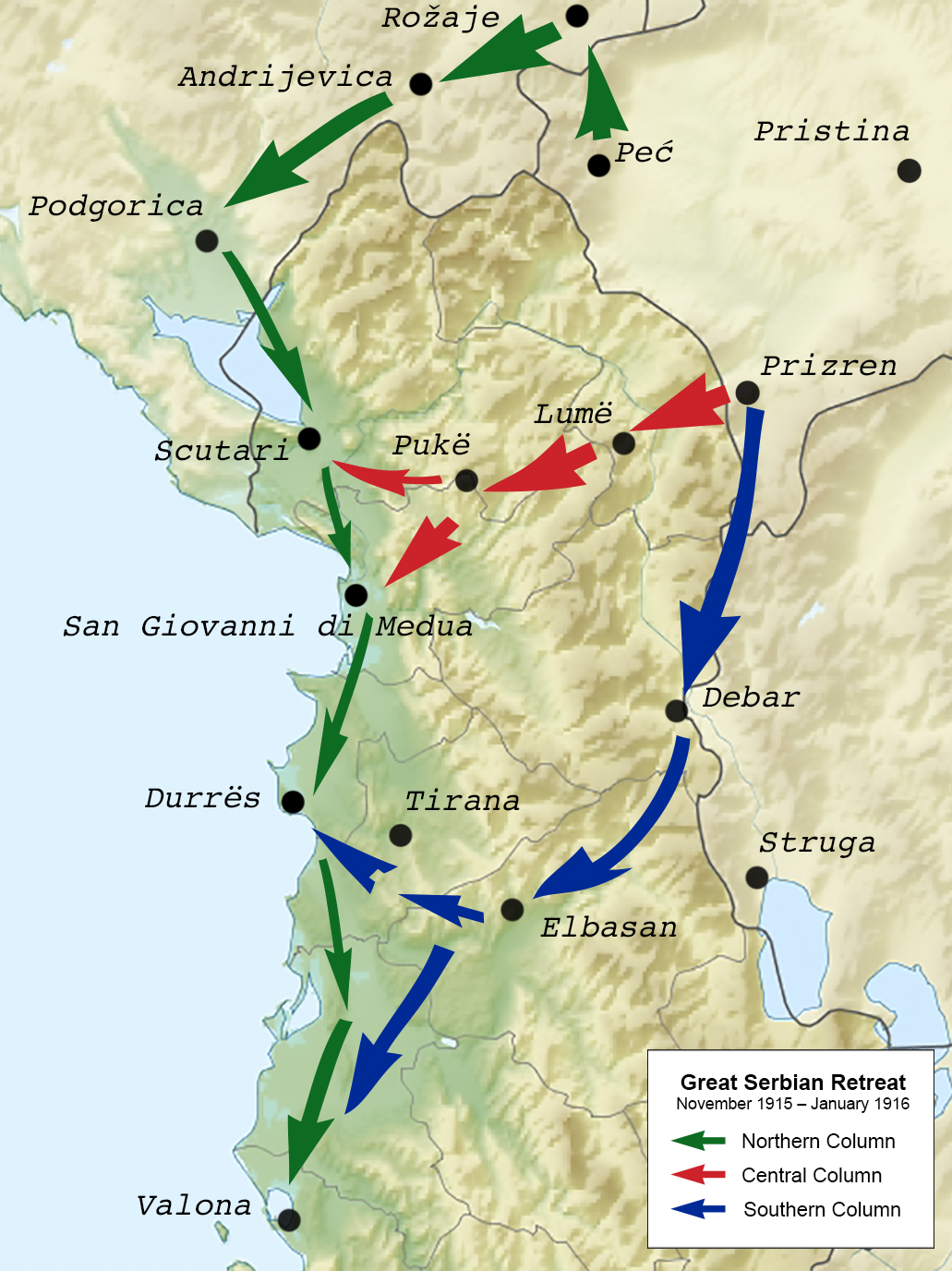
Withdrawal directions of the Serbian army during the Winter of 1915/16

Kosovo during World War I was initially, for about a year, completely filled with Serbian military forces, which retreated towards Albania to continue further to Corfu. After the occupation of the territories by Austria-Hungary, the German Empire, and the Kingdom of Bulgaria as allies in the First World War, the occupied territories were divided. The years 1915–1918 in the occupied Bulgarian zone are considered the most tragic years of poverty and hunger for the population of this part of Kosovo. The lack of bread was felt not only because of the drought, but also because the invaders confiscated the people's grain. Unlike the Bulgarian occupation zone, the Austro-Hungarians pursued a policy aimed at benefiting the general populace. They began to disregard some national rights, which for Albanians had vital value.

== Background ==
Kosovo was under Serb control at the outbreak of World War I. Serbia's claim to the region, conquered by its army under King Petar I Karađorđević (r. 1903–1921) in late 1912, had been recognized by the Conference of Ambassadors in London in July 1913. The closing of the border with Albania cut the northern Albanian tribes off from their traditional markets in Gjakova and Prizren, thus causing continued hostility and resistance to Serb rule.

== Overview ==
Austria-Hungary declared war on Serbia in July 1914, thus precipitating World War I, and by October 1915, Bulgarian troops had occupied Prishtina, Prizren, Kaçanik, Gjilan, and Ferizaj. In the following month, Austro-Hungarian forces themselves reached Kosovo and occupied the other, northern half of the territory. With its troops routed and in a state of disarray, the Serb government, in flight with the military, gave orders on November 20, 1915, for the evacuation of the entire Serb army through the mountains of Albania to the Adriatic coast. The Great Serb Retreat, as this event is known, was an epic in itself and cost the lives of about 100,000 men, both soldiers and civilians. Very few soldiers reached the safety of Corfu alive.

The Albanian population in Kosovo welcomed the Austrian-Hungarians as liberators. In December, the Austrian authorities began installing Albanians in local government and allowing them to use their language in the administration. From 1916 to 1918, they encouraged the opening of about 300 Albanian-language schools, which had been forbidden under Serbian rule. But the tables soon turned. On October 6, 1918, German and Austrian forces withdrew from Kosovo. In the following weeks, French and Italian troops, assisted by Serb guerrilla units, were in control of the whole region. By December 1918, Kosovo had returned to Serb rule, and the Albanian population paid the price, as it had in 1912–1913.

== See also ==
- Kosovo offensive (1915)
- Kosovo during World War II
- 20th-century history of Kosovo
- Yugoslav colonisation of Kosovo
