= Capture of Üskup =

Event in the 1912 Albanian revolt

- Part of Albanian revolt of 1912
- Albanian rebels entering Üsküp
Date	11–15 August 1912
Location	Üskup, Kosovo Vilayet, Ottoman Empire now North Macedonia, Skopje
Result	Albanian victory: Capture of Üskup by Albanian rebels; End of the Albanian revolt

Belligerents
Albanian rebels	Ottoman Empire

Commanders and leaders
Idriz Seferi; Isa Boletini; Bajram Curri	Mehmed V Kara Said Pasha; Ibrahim Pasha

Units involved
10,000 Rebels under Idriz Seferi from: Karadak (Kumanovo, Preševo); 200–300 rebels under Isa Boletini and Bajram Curri from: Kosovo; North Albania; Pollog (Tetovo); Dibër	Ottoman Garrison

Strength
500 (beginning); More than 30,000 after the capture	4,000

The Capture of Üskup marked a significant event during the Albanian revolt of 1912. Led by Idriz Seferi, Albanian rebels successfully seized Üskup from the Ottoman Authorities, which served as the capital of the Kosovo Vilayet at the time. This capture prompted the Young Turk government in Constantinople to accept the Albanian demands, chief among them being the establishment of an Autonomous Albanian vilayet. The event also played a vital role in the creation of the Albanian state.

== Capture ==
In July 1912, Albanian rebels gathered their forces in Kosovo after successfully capturing major cities in the region, including Prishtina, Ferizaj, and Gjakova, which were previously under control of the Ottoman Empire. As early August approached, Albanian troops embarked on a southern march towards the provincial capital, Üsküb (Skopje). On August 11, a group of approximately 200 Albanian rebels from Gjakova, led by Zef Kol Ndoka and Bajram Daklani entered Skopje. Their actions included raising the Albanian flag within the city. However, they were ultimately forced to retreat after fighting with the Ottoman troops in the city. On August 13, another contingent of Albanian soldiers from Karadak, led by Idriz Seferi and Isa Boletini, entered the city with a force of five hundred fighters. They confronted the 4,000 Ottoman soldiers stationed there and demanded the immediate surrender of Üsküb to the Albanian rebels. Following fighting on August 14, the Ottoman garrison surrendered, while more Albanian troops reached the city from the areas of Karadak, Prishtina and Dibër. On August 15, Bajram Curri marched into the liberated city, accompanied by over 30,000 rebels. As they entered Üsküp, the Albanians encountered no resistance from the city's inhabitants. After capturing Üsküp, the Albanian rebels from Karadak, under Idriz Seferi marched towards Kumanova and Preševo, liberating both of them. Meanwhile, a smaller unit marched towards Tetovo, also capturing it for the Albanian rebels.
