= Alaševce =

Alaševce Алашевце Allashec
- Village
- Location within North Macedonia
- Coordinates: 42°11′N 21°35′E
- Country: North Macedonia
- Region: Southeastern
- Municipality: Lipkovo

Population (2021)
  - Total: 89
- Time zone: UTC+1 (CET)
  - Summer (DST): UTC+2 (CEST)
- Car plates: KU
- Website: .

Alaševce (Macedonian: Алашевце, Albanian: Allashec) is a village in the municipality of Lipkovo, North Macedonia.

== History ==
Descendants of the Krasniqi fis were recorded in the villages of Gošince, Slupčane, Alaševce and Runica in 1965.

== Demographics ==
As of the 2021 census, Alaševce had 89 residents with the following ethnic composition:

- Albanians 84
- Persons for whom data are taken from administrative sources 5

According to the 2002 census, the village had a total of 126 inhabitants. Ethnic groups in the village include:

- Albanians 119
- Others 7
