= Runica =

Runica Руница Runicë
- Village
- Location within North Macedonia
- Coordinates: 42.2142°N 21.6107°E
- Country: North Macedonia
- Region: Southeastern
- Municipality: Lipkovo

Population (2002)
  - Total: 69
- Time zone: UTC+1 (CET)
  - Summer (DST): UTC+2 (CEST)
- Car plates: KU
- Website: .

Runica (Macedonian: Руница; Albanian: Runicë) is a village in the Lipkovo municipality, in North Macedonia. In the Middle Ages, there was a village called Rućinci (Serbian: Рућинци), which was one of the villages granted (metochion) by sevastokrator Dejan (fl. 1346-1366) to the Arhiljevica.

== History ==
Descendants of the Krasniqi fis were recorded in the villages of Gošince, Slupčane, Alaševce and Runica in 1965.

== Demographics ==
According to the 2002 census, the village had a total of 69 inhabitants. Ethnic groups in the village include:

- Albanians 69
