= Sopa (tribe) =

Albanian tribe; region of Sharr Mountains

The Sopa or Sopi tribe is a historical Albanian tribe (fis) originating from the Sharr Mountains of today's Kosovo, Albania and North Macedonia. Members of the tribe can be found in many Albanian-inhabited regions of Kosovo and North Macedonia, specifically in and around Prizren.

== Origins ==
The Sopa tribe is of Albanian ancestry and are considered to have their origins in the Sharr mountains; the Kokaj are one of the branches of the tribe. There is also a claim that the Sopa descend from the Thaçi tribe of Pukë.

The root of the tribe's name can possibly be derived from ‘sop,-i’, which translates to ‘hummock’ in English, but can also mean ‘wedge/spearhead’ or the end of a mill race where the water comes out with force and into the mill wheel. German Albanologist Johann Georg von Hahn translates their name as 'hay'.

== Distribution ==
Many of the tribe's members can be found in the territories around the Sharr Mountains, in Albania, Kosovo and North Macedonia. Branches of the Sopa tribe were present in Leskovac, and they predominated in the Moravica Valley.

== See also ==
- Tribes of Albania

== Sources ==
- Ramadani, Nijazi (1909). "Imazhi i Ngrirë" (PDF). Gjilan: SHB “RRJEDHA”.
