= Brest, Čučer-Sandevo =

Brest Брест Brezë
- Village
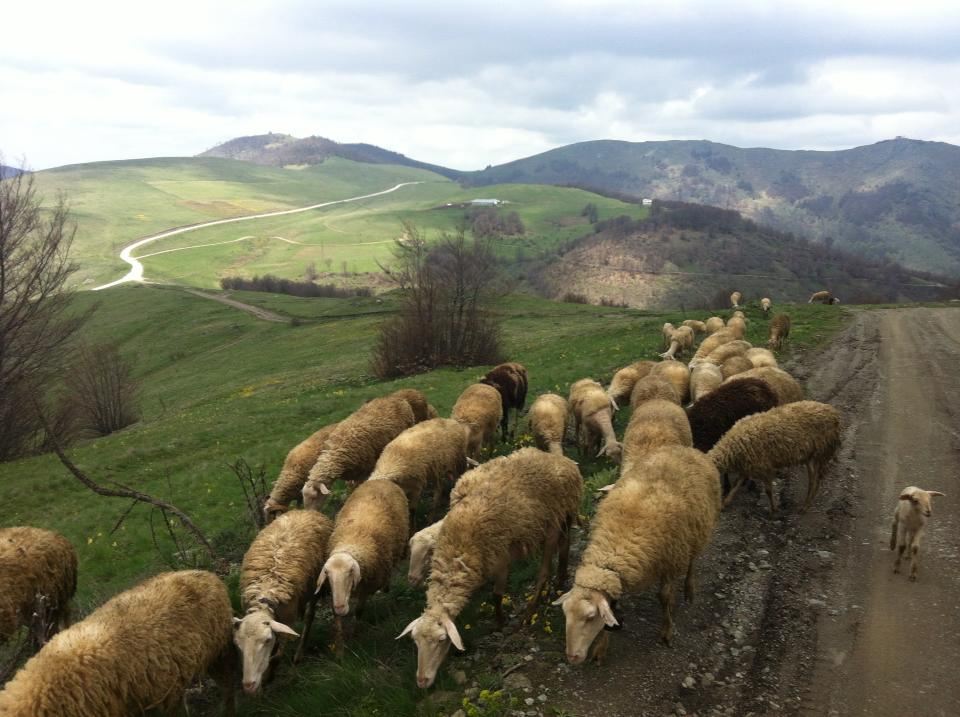
- countryside near Brest

- Location within North Macedonia
- Coordinates: 42°13′35″N 21°27′50″E
- Country: North Macedonia
- Region: Skopje
- Municipality: Čučer-Sandevo

Population (2021)
  - Total: 278
- Time zone: UTC+1 (CET)
  - Summer (DST): UTC+2 (CEST)
- Car plates: SK
- Website: .

Brest (Macedonian: Брест, Albanian: Brezë) is a village in the municipality of Čučer-Sandevo, Republic of North Macedonia.

== Demographics ==
As of the 2021 census, Brest had 278 residents with the following ethnic composition:

- Albanians 230
- Persons for whom data are taken from administrative sources 48

According to the 2002 census, the village had a total of 569 inhabitants. Ethnic groups in the village include:

- Albanians 564
- Romani 1
- Others 4
