= Komogllavë =

Village in Kosovo

- Village
- Location within Kosovo Location within Europe
- Coordinates: 42°20′35″N 21°12′57″E
- Country: Kosovo
- District: Ferizaj
- Municipality: Ferizaj

Population (2024)
  - Total: 3,125
- Time zone: UTC+1 (CET)
  - Summer (DST): UTC+2 (CEST)

Komogllavë is a village in Ferizaj Municipality, Kosovo. According to the Kosovo Agency of Statistics (KAS) from the 2024 census, there were 3,125 people residing in Komogllavë, with Albanians constituting the majority of the population.
