= Battle of Kaçanik Pass =

Battle during the Revolt of 1910

- Part of Albanian revolt of 1910
Date	30 April – 1 May 1910
Location	Kaçanik, Kosovo Vilayet, Ottoman Empire
Result	Ottoman victory

Belligerents
Albanian soldiers	Ottoman Empire

Commanders and leaders
Idriz Seferi	Shevket Turgut Pasha

Units involved
Volunteers under Idriz Seferi from; Karadak	Ottoman Army composed of Kurdish irregulars

Strength
3,000 rebels	40,000

Casualties and losses
800 killed or wounded	2,000+ killed 90 Ottoman officers killed 20 battalions destroyed

The Battle of Kaçanik Pass (Albanian: Beteja e Grykës së Kaçanikut) was a battle between Albanian rebels and Ottoman forces during the Revolt of 1910. The clashes represented a series of military offensives launched by Shevket Turgut Pasha against Albanian rebels that blocked the railway to Skopje at the Kaçanik Pass.

== Background ==
In 1910 the Young Turk Ottoman government imposed new centralization policies in Albania, which resulted in the Albanian revolt of 1910. The Rebels were supported by the Kingdom of Serbia. New taxes levied in the early months of 1910 led to Isa Boletini's activity to convince Albanian leaders who had already been involved in a 1909 uprising to try another revolt against the Ottoman Empire. The Albanian attacks on the Ottomans in Priştine (now Pristina) and Ferizovik (now Ferizaj), the killing of the Ottoman commander in İpek (now Peja), and the insurgents' blocking of the railway to Skopje at the Kaçanik Pass led to the Ottoman government's declaration of martial law in the area.

== Battle ==
By the end of April 1910, Albanian rebels under Idriz Seferi numbering 3,000 blocked the railway to Skopje at the Kaçanik Pass. They captured a train conveying soldiers and military supplies to the Ottoman garrison of Pristina, disarmed the soldiers and held the supplies. Following this, Tergut Pasha attacked the Kaçanik Pass with 16,000 men. After 13 hours of heavy fighting the Ottomans were defeated by the Albanians led by Idriz Seferi. Tergut Pasha then planned another attack and increased the size of his army to 40,000 men. After two days of fierce fighting, the Ottoman forces captured the Kaçanik Pass. Idriz Seferi's forces then withdrew to defensive positions in the village of Komogllava near Kaçanik, where the Ottomans attacked the Albanian rebels and again suffered heavy casualties, Idriz Seferi himself slew 12 Turkish Soldiers during the fighting in Komogllava, but again Albanian forces were defeated and forced to withdraw due to superior numbers of the Ottoman forces. Idriz Seferi then withdrew with his remaining soldiers to the Karadak region, where he continued his resistance.

== Aftermath ==
Despite losing the Battle, the Albanians managed to inflict heavy losses to the Ottoman army and continued their resistance in Karadak. In all the Ottomans lost over 2,000 men in Karadak. After the Battle Tergut Pasha continued his campaign and attacked the Albanian forces led by Isa Boletini and Hasan Budakova, which meanwhile were blocking the Ferizovik-Prizren road to Carraleva Pass. Superior in numbers, the Ottoman forces tried at first a frontal attack but the stiff resistance offered made them change their tactics. They made a pincer movement, trying to encircle the Albanian forces in Carralevo pass.

After three days of fighting the Albanian forces withdrew to the Drenica region. Ottoman forces entered Prizren in the middle of May 1910. They proceeded to Gjakova and Peja where they entered on June 1, 1910. By government orders part of the force proceeded in the direction of Shkodër, while another column marched toward the Debre region (now known as Dibër in Albania, and Debar in the Republic of North Macedonia). The first column marching to Scutari managed to capture the Morinë pass, after fighting with the Albanian tribal forces of the Gashi, Krasniqi and Bytyqi areas, led by Zeqir Halili, Abdulla Hoxha, and Shaban Binaku. Ottoman forces were stopped for more than 20 days in the Agri Pass, from the Albanian forces of Shalë, Shoshë, Nikaj and Mërtur areas, led by Prel Tuli, Mehmet Shpendi, and Marash Delia. Unable to repress their resistance, this column took another way to Shkodër, passing from the Pukë region. On July 24, 1910, Ottoman forces entered the city of Shkodër. During this period martial courts were put in action and summary executions took place. A large number of firearms were collected and many villages and properties were burned by the Ottoman army.

== See also ==
- Battle of Carraleva Pass
- Albanian revolt of 1912

== Sources ==
- Akçam, Taner (2004), From empire to republic: Turkish nationalism and the Armenian genocide, Zed Books, ISBN 978-1-84277-527-1
- Elsie, Robert (2004), Historical dictionary of Kosova, Scarecrow Press, ISBN 978-0-8108-5309-6
- Finkel, Caroline (2006), Osman's dream: the story of the Ottoman Empire, 1300–1923, Basic Books, ISBN 978-0-465-02396-7
- Frashëri, Kristo (1984), Historia e popullit shqiptar në katër vëllime (in Albanian), vol. II, Tiranë, OCLC 255273594
- Gawrych, George Walter (2006), The crescent and the eagle: Ottoman rule, Islam and the Albanians, 1874–1913, I.B.Tauris, ISBN 978-1-84511-287-5
- Jelavich, Barbara (1983), History of the Balkans: Twentieth century, Cambridge University Press, ISBN 978-0-521-27459-3
- Pearson, Owen (2004), Albania and King Zog: independence, republic and monarchy 1908–1939, I.B.Tauris, ISBN 978-1-84511-013-0
- Karpat, Kemal (3 May 2001), The Politicization of Islam: Reconstructing Identity, State, Faith, and Community in the Late Ottoman State, Oxford University Press, ISBN 978-0-19-028576-0
- Bloxham, Donald (2005), The Great Game of Genocide: Imperialism, Nationalism, and the Destruction of the Ottoman Armenians, OUP Oxford, ISBN 978-0-19-150044-2
