= Idriz Seferi =

Albanian rebel leader

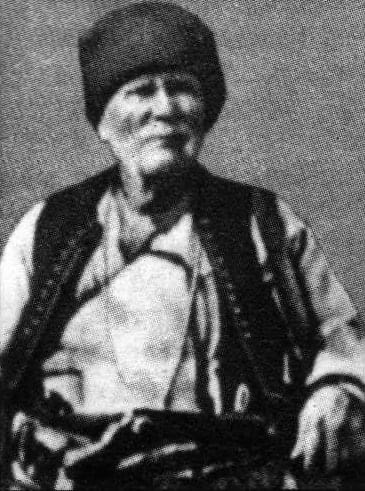
- Born: 14 March 1847; Sefer, Kosovo Vilayet, Ottoman Empire (present-day Serbia)
- Died: 25 March 1927 (aged 80)
- Military career
- Allegiance: League of Prizren; League of Peja
- Branch: Kachak
- Service years: 1878–1918
- Rank: Commander
- Nickname: İdriz Bey
- Commands: Karatonlu nahiya Ferizovik (1912); Üsküp (1912)
- Conflicts: Battles for Plav and Gusinje: Battle of Novšiće; Macedonian Struggle: Battle of Pasjane; Albanian-Turkish War (1881); Albanian-Turkish War (1900); Albanian Revolt of 1910: Battle of Kaçanik Pass; Battle of Carraleva Pass; Albanian Revolt of 1911: Battle of Drenogllava; Albanian Revolt of 1912: Capture of Üskup; Balkan Wars; World War I Kachak Movement
- Awards: Hero of Kosovo (posthumously)

Idriz Seferi (14 March 1847 – 25 March 1927) was an Albanian nationalist, revolutionary leader, and guerrilla fighter who played a prominent role in the Albanian uprisings against the Ottoman Empire, the Kingdom of Serbia, and the Kingdom of Bulgaria during the late 19th and early 20th centuries. During his 56-year military career, he fought in 35 battles.

A member of both the League of Prizren and the League of Peja, he was a close collaborator of Isa Boletini, with whom he organized an Albanian uprising against the Ottoman Empire in 1910 in the Kosovo Vilayet. After the suppression of the uprising, Seferi continued fighting against the Ottoman authorities and played a prominent role in the Albanian uprising of 1912. During the First Balkan War, Boletini and Seferi rose up against Serbia and continued attacking Serbian posts during the subsequent occupation and the initial phase of World War I (1913–1915). In the second phase of the war (1916–1918), he led his troops against Bulgarian forces.

== Early life ==
Idriz Seferi was born to an Albanian family in the village of Sefer (in present-day Preševo, Serbia) in the Karadaku region, which was then part of the Kosovo Vilayet of the Ottoman Empire. He joined the Albanian national movement at an early age, becoming a member of the League of Prizren (established in 1878) and the League of Peja (established in 1899).

== Early Activities ==
=== Great Eastern Crisis ===
During the Great Eastern Crisis, Idriz Seferi lead a cheta of Albanian Kachak warriors, fighting against the Ottoman authorities and the Serbian and Bulgarian chetas. In May 1875, in a battle that took place near Preševo between his cheta and an Ottoman expedition, he was wounded in the head twice by 2 Ottoman Bullets. While Operating in South Serbia, Idriz Seferi was captured by Ottomans and imprisoned in Niš. An Ottoman court, assessing him as a dangerous person, sentenced him to 101 years in prison. The situation created by the Russo-Ottoman war of 1877-1878 influenced his release from Niš prison in November 1877. As a result of this war, the Principality of Serbia, which joined the Russian army against the Ottoman Empire, had made progress towards the south, taking the Sanjak of Niš, Pirot, Vranje, Leskovac and had reached Gjilan. Seferi was fighting against the Serbian forces up to Vranje and Leskovac.

=== Plav War ===
During the Plav War, Idriz Seferi commanded a group 100 Albanian warriors, which participated in the Battle of Nokšić, where the Montenegrin army suffered a heavy defeat.

=== Albanian-Turkish War 1881 ===
On January 4, 1881, during the League of Prizren-Ottoman War, Seferi and his cheta joined Albanian forces commanded by Sulejman Vokshi which attacked Skopje. During the Battle, Seferi and his men attacked the barracks of the Ottoman army from the northeastern part of the city. The Albanian League was victorious and took control of Skopje. After the takover of Pristina by Vokshi, Seferi with his men took Kumanovo on January 19, 1881, and Preševo on January 21, 1881. From there he headed towards Gjilan, which he took together with the forces of Ali Ibër Neza and Mic Sokoli. Idriz Seferi resisted the forces of Dervish Pasha, who were trying to regain control over Gjilan. He participated in Battles against the Ottomans in Carraleva, Shtime and Slivovo, before withdrawing and taking refuge with his cheta into the Skopska Crna Gora.

=== 1893 Uprising ===
After the end of the League of Prizren, Idriz Seferi continued his resistance against the Ottomans. Thus, in 1893, together with 100 Kachaks from Skopska Crna Gora, he took part in the uprising that had erupted in Drenica and Shala e Bajgorës. During the uprising he came into contact with Haxhi Zeka, who had promised him that he would support him in the eastern part of Kosovo.

== Later Activities ==
=== Macedonian Struggle ===
In 1907, during the Macedonian Struggle, Idriz Seferi came into conflict with Serbian Chetniks that were operating in Eastern Kosovo. In July he fought and killed Dragoljub Nikolić and Rade Radivojević, both high ranking Serbian Chetniks, alongside their entire Cheta in Pasjane and Gjylekar.

=== 1910 Uprising ===
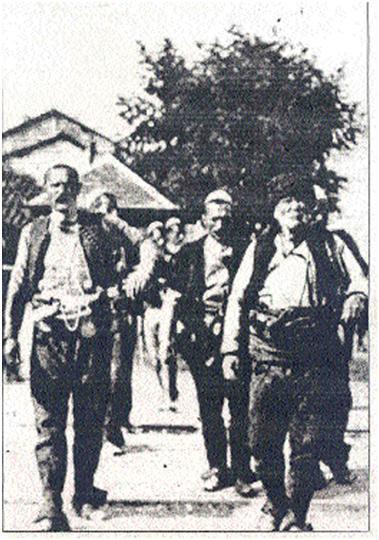
Idriz Seferi and his guerrillas entering Ferizaj.

In the spring of 1910, another Albanian revolt broke out against the Ottomans; twelve Albanian tribes of the Kosovo Vilayet rose in revolt under Isa Boletini and Idriz Seferi, who gathered 9,000 fighters. 3,000 rebels under Seferi defeated Ottoman forces and captured Gjilan. From there, they cut off the Prishtina-Üsküp railway at Kaçanik, and Seferi took command of 5,000 Albanian fighters who resisted the Ottoman forces at the gorge of the Kaçanik Pass. In response to the revolt, the Ottomans sent a large army commanded by Shevket Turgut Pasha, which clashed with the Albanians who had blocked the railway. Meanwhile, Boletini led 2,000 rebels onto Ferizaj and Prizren.

At Kaçanik Pass, Seferi managed to hold the pass for more than a fortnight and inflicted heavy casualties on the Ottomans despite lacking any artillery whatsoever. Seferi's men were only driven out after a desperate battle lasting thirteen hours, for they were greatly outnumbered by a Turkish army numbering 40,000 men. After the Battle at Kaçanik Pass, Seferi and his men retreated to defensive positions near Komogllava, where Seferi himself killed 12 Turkish soldiers, but was ultimately forced to retreat to the Karadak Mountains, where he continued his resistance against the Turks, with the Albanians killing over 2,000 Ottoman soldiers. The largest battle during the insurgency took place at Carraleva Pass, where the Albanians initially repelled the Ottomans before local Serbs informed them of a shortcut over the mountains that would enable them to encircle the Albanians. This forced the rebels to withdraw, and although Seferi and Boletini managed to evade capture, thousands of Albanians were killed, imprisoned and interned.

The uprising was quelled by the 40,000 Ottoman troops under Shefket Turgut Pasha, however not without difficulty. By August, the Ottomans had re-established their control and took harsh measures to maintain suzerainty in the Kosovo Vilayet: all men aged 15–60 were registered (for conscription); Albanian men were disarmed and those eligible were conscripted into the Ottoman army. Boletini laid down his arms after he and a Vıçıtırın state ambassador went to the Kosovo vali, who promised to meet his requests. Idriz Seferi then followed suit.

=== 1911 Uprising ===
==== Battle of Drenogllava ====
On March 5, 1911, Idriz Seferi together with Isa Boletini faced an Ottoman army sent by Osman Pasha to crush the Albanian rebels. The first column of the Ottoman army, led by Saduddin Bey, headed to Drenogllava in its foothills, just to be ambushed by Halim Begunca with 30-40 warriors, after which the entire Ottoman army consisting of 2000 men marched to the ambush site, falling into a trap by Idriz Seferi, who surrounded the entire Ottoman army, Osman Pasha then ordered two battalions of Shahid Bey to go to the aid of Saduddin Bey. Osman Pasha's maneuver was immediately understood by the Albanian rebels. Isa Boletini then cut the way for Osman Pasha's formations, thus the Ottoman army was divided into three parts and each of them was surrounded by Albanian rebels. After almost a month of heavy fighting, on May 5, Osman Pasha ordered his army to withdraw, ending the Battle with an Albanian victory.

=== 1912 Uprising ===
On 23 April 1912, Hasan Prishtina's rebels revolted in the Gjakova Highlands, and the revolt then spread within the Kosovo Vilayet. On 20 May 1912, Albanian chiefs Bajram Curri, Isa Boletini, Riza Gjakova, Idriz Seferi, Hasan Prishtina, Nexhib Draga, and others, decided on a general armed insurrection throughout the Kosovo Vilayet. Seferi organized the rebels in the Ferizaj area.

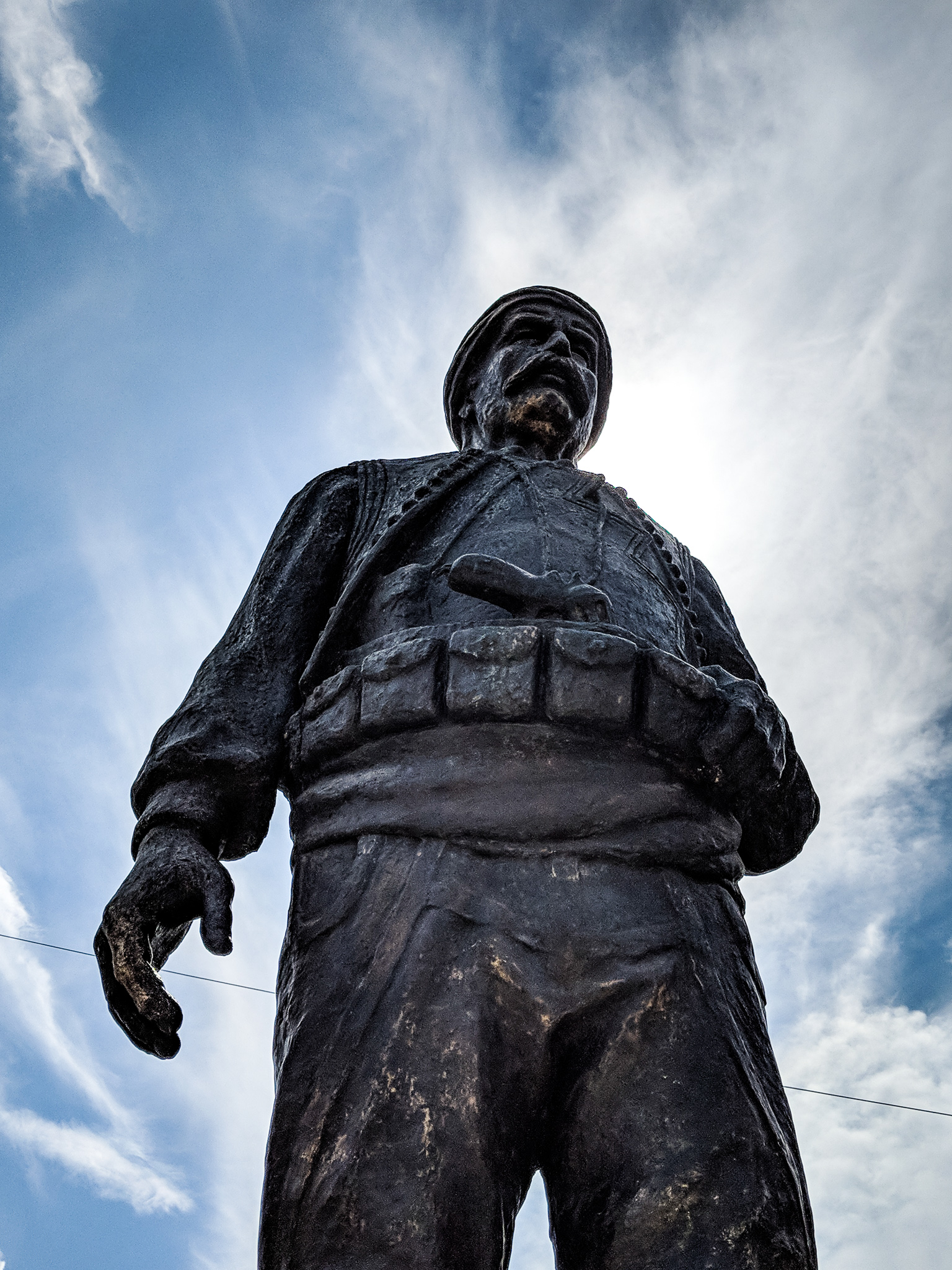
Idriz Seferi in Gjilan

On August 18, the moderate faction led by Prishtina managed to convince Seferi and the other leaders Isa Boletini, Bajram Curri and Riza Bey Gjakova of the conservative group to accept the agreement with the Ottomans for Albanian sociopolitical and cultural rights.

=== Balkan Wars ===
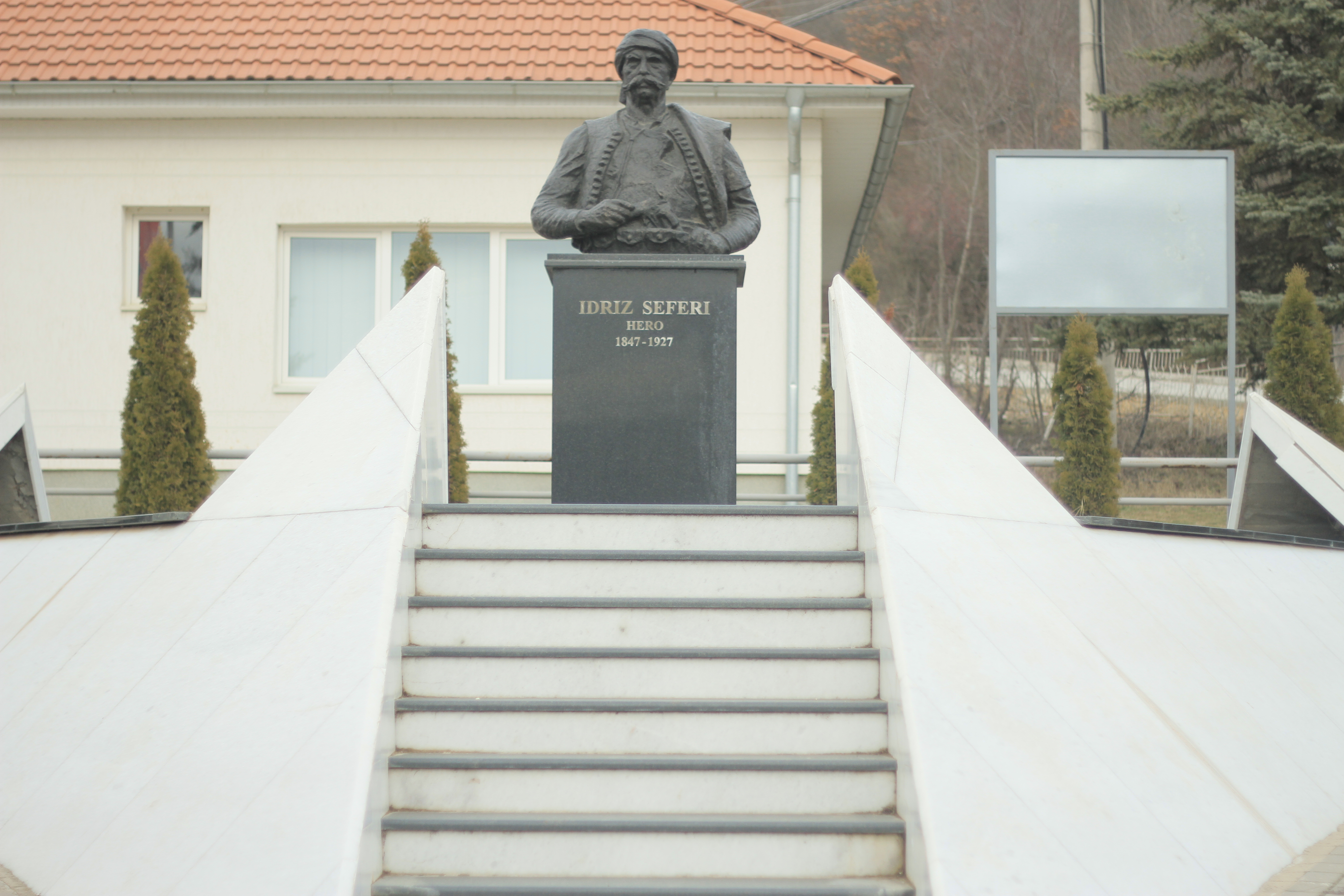
Monument to Idriz Seferi in Gjilan

In a bid to conquer Albanian-inhabited territories that stretched from Kosovo and Ulqin to Durrës as well as Lake Ohrid to the Adriatic Sea, Serbo-Montenegrin forces attacked the Ottoman state in October 1912. The Ottomans provided a weak resistance, whereas Albanian units under Idriz Seferi, Isa Boletini and Bajram Curri provided stiff resistance to the Serbian advances. During the invasion, the Serbians massacred 20,000-25,000 Albanians in an attempt to ethnically-cleanse these regions. The Serbians had hoped that the statistical manipulation of the regional demographics would strengthen their claims before the Great Powers convened in London in December 1912 to finalise the new borders in the Balkans.

When Serbian forces continued to occupy Kosovo during 1913-1915, Seferi continued his struggle to liberate Kosovo and unite it with Albania. During the First Balkan war, Seferi recruited 6,000 men from Karadak and attacked Serbian frontier posts. They were armed with Martinis and Serbian rapid-fire guns that had been supplied by Serbia during the 1909 Albanian Uprising. The notion of the Albanians using Serbian weapons and money against Serbia enraged the army.

Seferi and his men engaged in a fierce battle at the Končulj pass in an attempt to halt the advance of the third Serbian Army, which consisted of approximately 76,000 soldiers, on their way to the city of Gjilan. Following seven days of intense combat, Seferi and his troops were compelled to withdraw, resulting in the capture of Gjilan by the Serbian army. Due to his actions against the Serbian army, 29 villages in Karadak were burned and hundreds of Albanians were killed. The entire Albanian civilian population of the villages Kabash, Lubishtë and Gjylekar were massacred by the Serbian army.

=== World War I ===
During the First World War, Idriz Seferi led an armed uprising in Karadak, which was occupied by Bulgaria. During a battle near his home village in Sefer, Idriz Seferi killed 20 Bulgarian soldiers. He would later be captured by the Bulgarians in 1916. After the conclusion of the war, Seferi continued to resist the Serbians as part of the Kachak Movement.

== Death and legacy ==
Idriz Seferi died in 1927. He was posthumously awarded the Hero of Kosovo-award by the Republic of Kosovo. There is a bust of him in Kaçanik.
