= Albanian revolt of 1910 =

Uprising against Ottoman rule in Albania

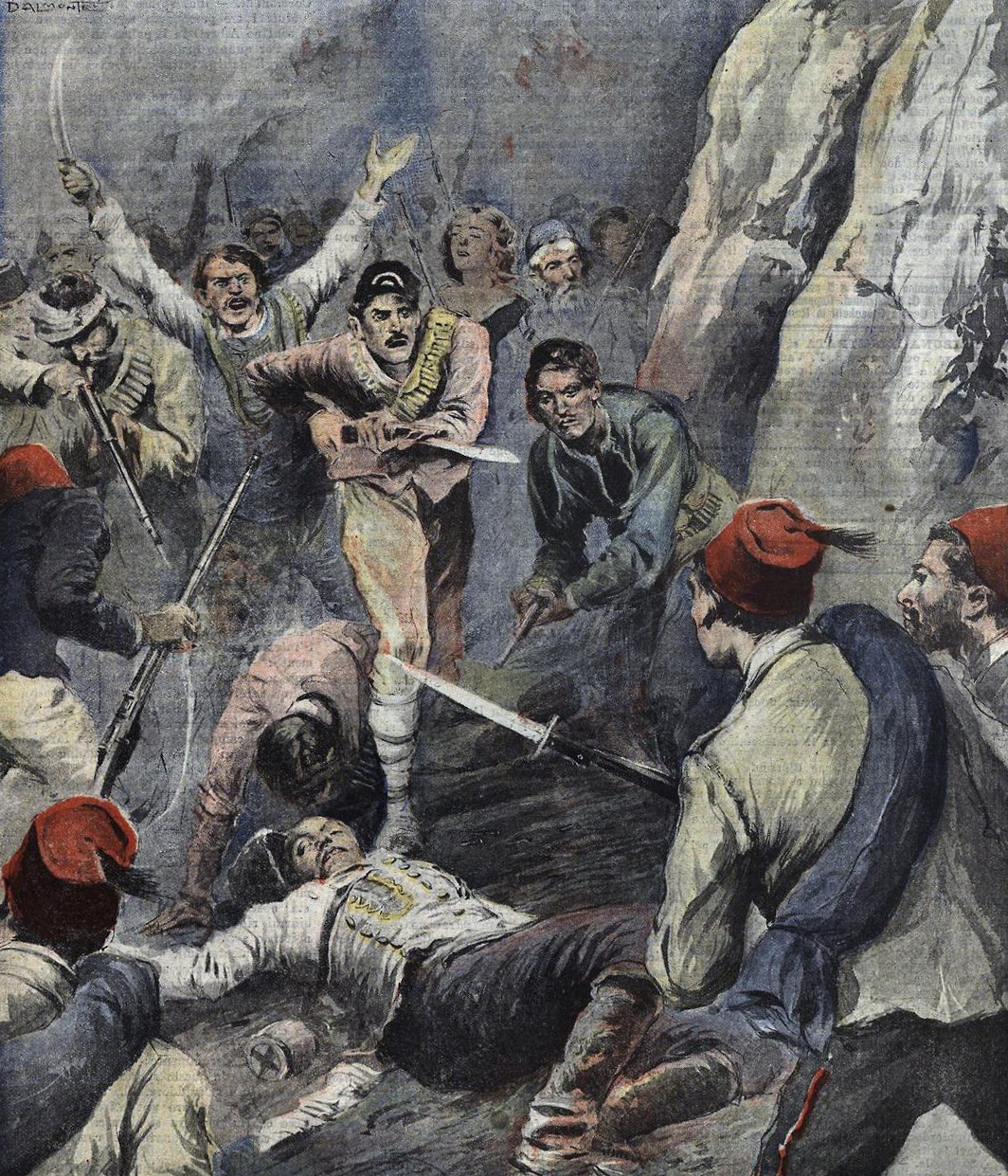
- Depiction of the revolt by The Illustrated Tribune, August 1910
| Date | March – 24 July 1910 |
| Location | Kosovo Vilayet, Ottoman Empire |
| Result | Ottoman victory: Rebellion suppressed |

Belligerents
| Albanian rebels Supported by: Montenegro; Bulgaria; Serbia | Ottoman Empire Committee of Union and Progress |

Commanders and leaders
| Isa Boletini; Idriz Seferi; Nazif Grazhdani; Dine Maqellara; Sherif Langu; Mulla Sinan Maxhera † | Mahmud Shevket Pasha; Mehmed Pasha; Mustafa Kemal |

Strength
| 3,000 men | 50,000 men |

The Albanian revolt of 1910 was a reaction to the new centralization policies of the Young Turk Ottoman government in Albania. It was the first of a series of major uprisings. Rebels were supported by the Kingdom of Serbia. New taxes levied in the early months of 1910 led to Isa Boletini's activity to convince Albanian leaders who had already been involved in a 1909 uprising to try another revolt against the Ottoman Empire. The Albanian attacks on the Ottomans in Priştine (now Pristina) and Ferizovik (now Ferizaj), the killing of the Ottoman commander in İpek (now Pejë), and the insurgents' blocking of the railway to Skopje at the Kaçanik Pass led to the Ottoman government's declaration of martial law in the area.

After two weeks of fierce fighting the Albanian forces withdrew to the Drenica region, whereas the Ottoman army took possession of the cities of Prizren and Yakova (now Gjakova). The Ottomans retook İpek on 1 June 1910 and two months later they entered Shkodër. The reprisals against the Albanian population included several summary executions, and the burning of many villages and properties. Many schools were closed, and publications in the Albanian alphabet, which had been approved two years earlier, in the Congress of Manastir, were declared illegal. Journalists and publishers were fined or sentenced to death.

== Events ==
During the first months of 1910, Isa Boletini tried to coordinate forces for a new insurrection by visiting the Albanian clans, which had taken refuge in Montenegro after the failure of a previous minor uprising in 1909. In the meantime the new governor, Masar Bey, introduced a new tax on commodities, which immediately became highly unpopular. Albanian leaders held two other meetings in Peja and Ferizaj, where they took the oath of besa to be united against the new Ottoman government policy of centralization. Forces led by Isa Boletini attacked the Ottoman forces in Pristina and Ferizaj, while the commander of Ottoman forces in Pejë was killed by the local population. The Ottoman government declared martial law and sent a military expedition of 16,000 men led by Shefqet Turgut Pasha who went to Skopje in April 1910.

At the same time 3,000 Albanians under Idriz Seferi blocked the Mitrovica-Skopje railway at the Kaçanik Pass. They captured a train conveying soldiers and military supplies to the Ottoman garrison of Pristina, disarmed the soldiers and held the supplies. The Ottoman forces attacked the Kaçanik Pass but the resistance given there by the Albanians led by Idriz Seferi made it clear that the 16,000 Ottoman forces were insufficient to crush the rebellion so their numbers were increased to 40,000 men. After two weeks of fierce fighting, the Ottoman forces captured the Kaçanik Pass and attacked the Albanian forces led by Isa Boletini and Hasan Budakova, which meanwhile were blocking the Ferizovik-Prizren road to Carraleva Pass. Superior in numbers, the Ottoman forces tried at first a frontal attack but the stiff resistance offered made them change their tactics. They made a pincer movement, trying to encircle the Albanian forces in Carralevo pass.

After three days of fighting the Albanian forces withdrew to the Drenica region. Ottoman forces entered Prizren in the middle of May 1910. They proceeded to Yakova and İpek where they entered on 1 June 1910. By government orders part of the force proceeded in the direction of Scutari (now Shkodër), while another column marched toward the Debre region (now known as Dibër in Albania, and Debar in the Republic of North Macedonia). The first column marching to Scutari managed to capture the Morinë pass, after fighting with the Albanian forces of Gash, Krasniq and Bytyç areas, led by Zeqir Halili, Abdulla Hoxha, and Shaban Binaku. Ottoman forces were stopped for more than 20 days in the Agri Pass, from the Albanian forces of Shalë, Shoshë, Nikaj and Mërtur areas, led by Prel Tuli, Mehmet Shpendi, and Marash Delia. Unable to repress their resistance, this column took another way to Scutari, passing from the Pukë region. On 24 July 1910 Ottoman forces entered the city of Shkodër. During this period martial courts were put in action and summary executions took place. A large number of firearms were collected and many villages and properties were burned by the Ottoman army. The Ottoman army, made up of irregular Kurds, flogged the leaders in public, burnt villages, and drove some 150,000 from their homes, two thirds being Serbs.

== Aftermath ==
Although the numbers of the Ottoman forces were now up to 50,000, they controlled only the lowlands and the cities, and failed to take control of the mountainous regions. At the request of the Ottoman commander Mehmet Shefqet Pasha, the Ottoman government declared the abrogation of the "Lekë Dukagjini Code" which was the mountain law of the Albanian clans. Some Albanian clans went to seek refuge in Montenegro, requesting an amnesty from the Ottoman government and the return of the conditions obtained before the rebellion. This was not accepted by the Ottoman government, which also declared the prohibition of the Albanian alphabet and books published in it. Albanian-language schools were declared illegal, and possessing a book in Albanian letters became a penal act. Strong through numbers and position, the Ottoman expedition continued its march towards central and southern Albania imposing the new prohibitions. Albanian schools were closed and publications in the Latin alphabet were declared illegal. A number of journalists and publishers were fined or sentenced to death while the entry of Albanian books published outside the Ottoman Empire was prohibited. After these events, Albania became a wasteland for Albanian patriots, and Albanian culture was fully suppressed. One year later, Sultan Mehmed V visited Pristina and declared an amnesty for all who had participated in the revolt, except for those who had committed murder.

The Albanian revolts of 1910 and 1912 were a turning point that impacted the Young Turk government which increasingly moved from a policy direction of pan-Ottomanism and Islam toward a singular national Turkish outlook.

== See also ==
- Albanian revolt of 1911
- Albanian revolt of 1912

== Sources ==
- Akçam, Taner (2004), From Empire to Republic: Turkish Nationalism and the Armenian Genocide, Zed Books, ISBN 978-1-84277-527-1
- Bloxham, Donald (2005), The Great Game of Genocide: Imperialism, Nationalism, and the Destruction of the Ottoman Armenians, OUP Oxford, ISBN 978-0-19-150044-2
- Elsie, Robert (2004), Historical Dictionary of Kosova, Scarecrow Press, ISBN 978-0-8108-5309-6
- Finkel, Caroline (2006), Osman's Dream: The Story of the Ottoman Empire, 1300–1923, Basic Books, ISBN 978-0-465-02396-7
- Frashëri, Kristo (1984), Historia e popullit shqiptar në katër vëllime (in Albanian), vol. II, Tiranë, OCLC 255273594
- Gawrych, George Walter (2006), The Crescent and the Eagle: Ottoman Rule, Islam and the Albanians, 1874–1913, I.B. Tauris, ISBN 978-1-84511-287-5
- Jelavich, Barbara (1983), History of the Balkans: Twentieth Century, Cambridge University Press, ISBN 978-0-521-27459-3
- Karpat, Kemal (2001), The Politicization of Islam: Reconstructing Identity, State, Faith, and Community in the Late Ottoman State, Oxford University Press, ISBN 978-0-19-028576-0
- Pearson, Owen (2004), Albania and King Zog: Independence, Republic and Monarchy 1908–1939, I. B. Tauris, ISBN 978-1-84511-013-0
