= List of people of Gjilan =

Gjilan has been the birthplace or a significant home to numerous famous individuals. Additionally, many "Gjilanas" have become worthy of note through their various charitable activities, donations and contributions. The following list contains persons of note who were born, raised, or spent portions of their lives in Gjilan.

== Agim Ramadani ==
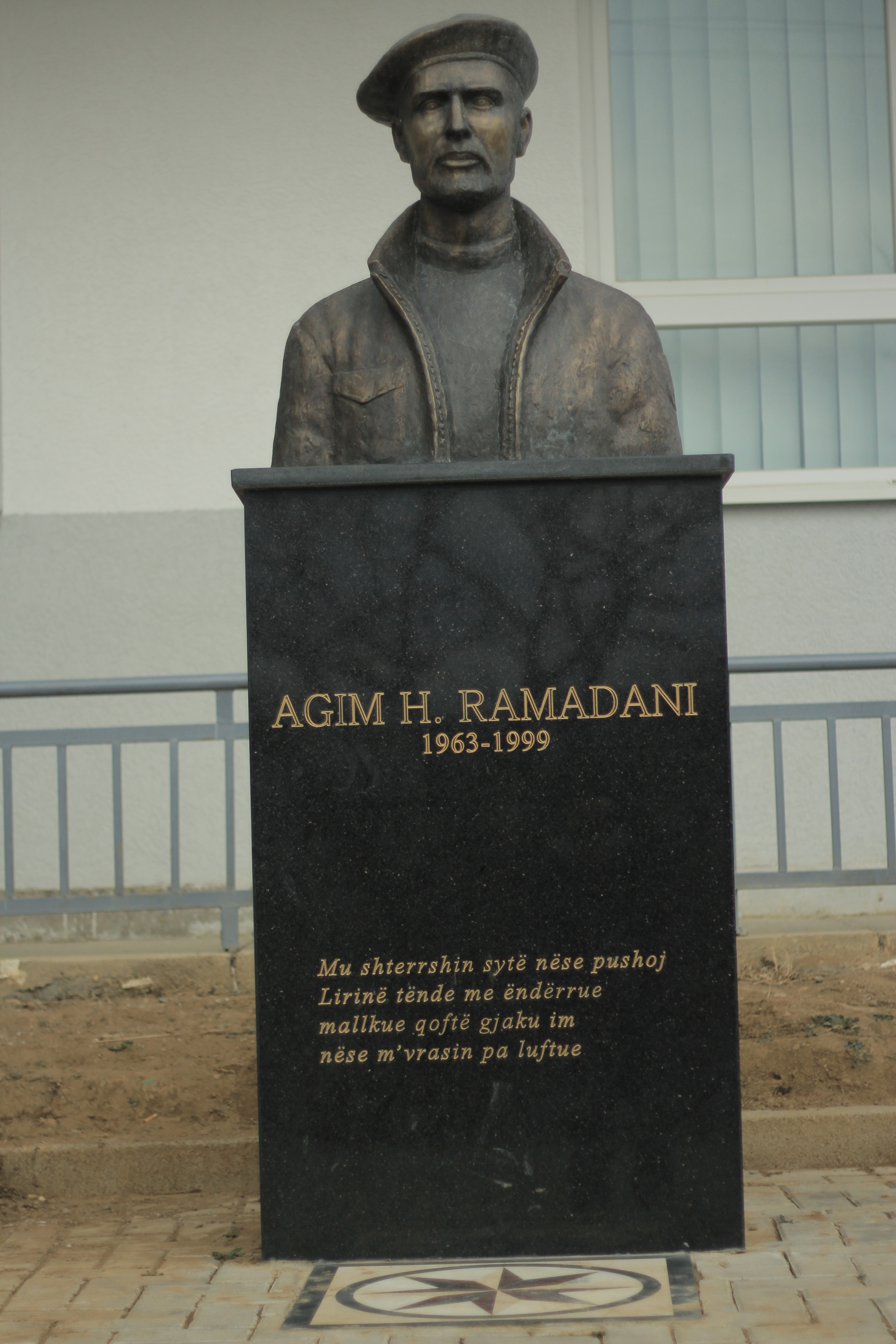
Permendorja Agim Ramadani

Agim Ramadani (3 May 1964 – April 1999) was an Albanian leader of the Kosovo Liberation Army. He was born in Zhegër of Gjilan. During the war he was a soldier that contributed for freedom in Kosovo. He lived in Prizren, while he was working in Germany. During the war he proved that he was a senior strategist and a good leader for soldiers. It was one of the drafters of the plan for breaking Albanian border, which was something that he accomplished with his peers. He was the first one to pull the stone-pyramid-border Koshare. His conspiracy-name was Katana. He was also qualified as one of the most famous heroes of recent history. Ramadani left behind three descendants, two boys and a girl.

== Nuhi Berisha ==
Nuhi Rexhep Berisha was born on 3 October 1961, in Sfirca (Kamenice). Berisha had a clear vision for the future of Kosovo and the courage to act against the regime. Nuhi Berisha established the War Party of Kosovo. He was the first spark of war.

== Athletes ==
=== Football players ===
==== Xherdan Shaqiri ====
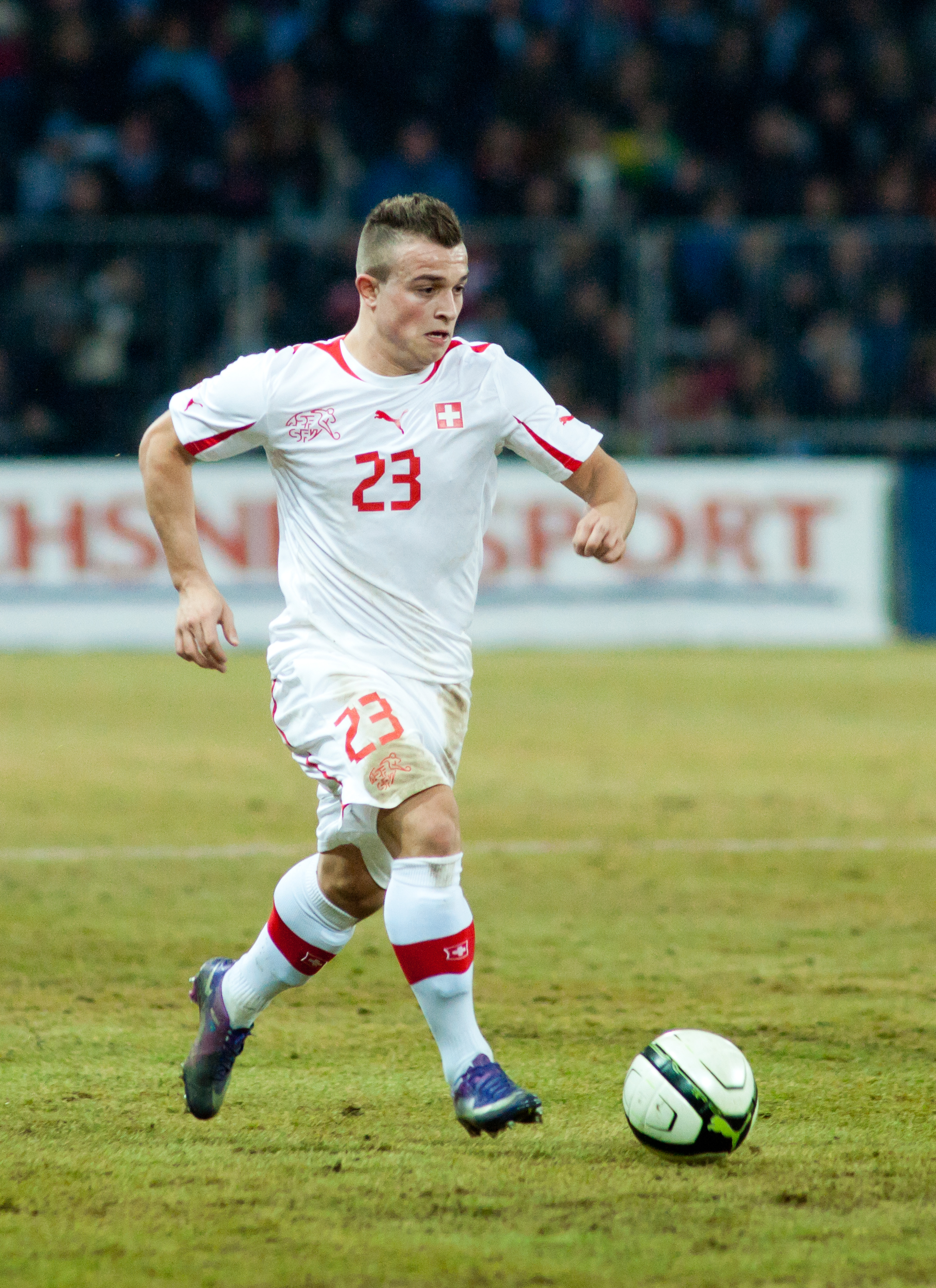
Xherdan Shaqiri - Switzerland vs. Argentina, 29 February 2012

Xherdan Shaqiri is a Swiss footballer who plays as a midfielder for FC Bayern Munich football team. He was born on 10 October 1991. As a child Xherdan moved to Switzerland with his family. Shaqiri's youth career began at SV Augst, then he joined FC Basel youth team. At the age of 15 Xherdan was named as the best player of the Under-15 Nike Cup, due to which he came to light in the world of football. Despite the invitations from various famous clubs, Shaqiri decided not to leave Basel. On January the 2nd 2009, Xherdan signed his first professional contract with the Swiss club, and on 2 July the young footballer played his first match against St. Gallen. On 9 November, he scored his first professional goal in a match against Neuchâtel Xamax. Thanks to great performance for Basel, the Swiss was again spotted by notable clubs. In February 2012 he was transferred to Bayern Munich for €11.5 million. Xherdan signed a four-year deal with his new club until 30 June 2016.Ever since his breakthrough into Basel's first team, Shaqiri has drawn widespread praise for his speed, both on and off the ball. Xherdan Shaqiri has a dual nationality: Swiss and Albanian.

==== Artan Latifi ====
Artan Latifi was born in Gjilan on 5 April 1983. He is a goalkeeper of the famous team KF Drita Gjilan. Latifi played for well known teams such as: KF Drita, KF Kek, KF Hysi and KF Besiana. He is a Kosovo Albanian professional football goalkeeper of KF Drita and Capitan which in 2002–2003 was proclaimed as the champion of the Super League of Kosovo. Latifi was awarded with the Cup with team Hysi and he also won the cup of Kosovo. In 2011, Artan Latifi was announced as sportsmen and the keeper of the year. Also, he received an award from Kosovofootball federation.

=== Karate ===
==== Fortesa Orana ====
Fortesa Orana is a representative for Kosovo in karate. She is a member of the Elite Karate club from Gjilan, which represents Kosovo country in different activities held in many international locations. She has won two gold medals at the Ozawa Cup and one of the bronze medal in the Junior International Open. Orana with the golden medal is the biggest success of Kosovo's representative of journey in Qatar. Orana was qualified as the karate sportswoman of 2012 during a ceremony that was organized by the Youth, Culture and Sport, supported by the Mayor, which was declared as the most outstanding one in Gjilan. Fortesa Orana is also announced as the 2012 Sportswoman from FKK (The Karate Federation in Kosovo).

== Arts and literature ==
=== Writers ===
==== Nijazi Ramadani ====
Nijazi Ramadani was born in 1964 in Kokaj, Gjilan. He finished his first lessons and high school in Gjilan, whereas in the Universiteti i Prishtinës of Pristina he finished Math and Informatics. Ramadani is known as a literary creator, where his literary creativity is mainly focused on the treatment of national motives, respectively the topic of patriotism. This work with his literary creations appeared in the '80's to the local press, where he published poetries in particular. During his work, he dealt with all genres of journalistic writings. He is a teacher, coordinator of artists, creators and journalists, Rrjedha, leads edition Rrjedha, where he published a number of works, and edited the magazine Ushtima e maleve, and also he is a member of Kosovo writers Association. He lives and still contributes with his career abilities in Gjilan.

== Political figures ==
=== Lutfi Haziri ===
Lutfi Haziri was born in Gjilan on 8 November 1969. He is the Deputy Prime Minister and Minister of Kosovo for Culture, Youth, Sports and Non-Residential Affairs. He headed the delegation of Kosovo in the talks on the political status of Kosovo. Haziri is a central figure in Kosovo politics and a candidate for the successor of the late Kosovo President Ibrahim Rugova for the chairmanship of the Democratic League of Kosovo (LDK). He led the Ministry of Culture, Youth and Sports, from June to October 2010, and was head of the Parliamentary Group of LDK from 2008 to 2010. Currently, he is the chairman of the LDK branch in Gjilan and member of the Parliament of the Republic of Kosovo. Lutfi Haziri is married to Mirvete Bajrami originally from Përlepnica and has three daughters Kënga, Lotina and Mimas and a son Lumi.

=== Zenun Pajaziti ===
Zenun Pajaziti was born in Gjilan on 12 September 1966. He is Deputy Minister of Labor and Social Welfare in the Government of the Republic of Kosovo. Pajaziti has been selected as the Chairman of the Democratic Party in Gjilan for a 4 year mandate. During the Kosovo war, Pajaziti served the Emergency Committee of Kosovo in Pristina where he was responsible for plenty of issues. From 2005 to 2007 he was a consultant with Public Administration International and a public sector management consultancy group funded by the Department for International Development in UK. Pajaziti is married and has two sons and a daughter.

=== Faton Bislimi ===
Faton Bislimi was born in Gjilan on 12 February 1983. His hometown Gjilan, was the place where he spent his childhood as well. Faton (Tony) Bislimi is a doctoral student of political science at the University of Alberta and the winner of a prestigious 3-year SSHRC Joseph Armand Bombardier-Canada Graduate Scholarship (CGS). In addition, he also won an award at the University of Alberta President's Prize of Distinction in 2012 and 2013. Bislimi completed a master's degree in Public Administration and International Development from the Kennedy School of Government at Harvard University, where he was a Kennedy Fellow, and a master's degree in International Relations from Dalhousie University. He also has served as lecturer at the Victory University College in Prishtina, American University in Kosovo, and at Dalhousie University and Mount Saint Vincent University in Halifax. Faton Bislimi lost his bid as an independent candidate in the 2007 mayoral elections in Gjilan. Bislimi was recently shortlisted to become Kosovo's first ambassador to the United States.

== Other notable people ==
- Zoran Antić, footballer
- Dragan Dimić, footballer
- Mirko Gashi, teacher, journalist, editor
- Jahi Jahiu, theater dramaturg
- Đorđe Martinović, farmer
- Mira Stupica, actress
- Goran Svilanović, politician
- Xhel Guri, Albanian insurgent
