= Flaka e Janarit =

Flaka e Janarit ("January Flame") is a multidisciplinary cultural event that runs from the 11th to the 31st of January. The event begins in Gjilan, Kosovo with symbolic opening of a flame.

Thousands of artists and art lovers from all the Albanian territories gather in Gjilan to participate in the three week long event. The event celebrates activists who died fighting for Kosovo to be recognized as an independent nation, such as Jusuf Gërvalla, founder of the National Movement for the Liberation of Kosovo and was assassinated on January 17, 1982. The festival centers on four pillars, derived from his writings: literary arts, performing arts, music, and visual arts.

== History ==
This event started in 1991. It is celebrated in primarily in Bresalca, Përlepnica, and Gjilan. Flaka e Janarit served both to honor those who had died fighting for Kosovo's independence and to reflect the country's ongoing struggle. For the first eight years that the festival was held, Kosovo was still under Serbian occupation and the event was illegal.

The name "Flaka e Janarit", meaning "Flame of January", comes from the fact that many political activists had died in January, such as Skanderbeg, Jusuf Gërvalla, Isa Boletini, Kadri Zeka, Bardhosh Gërvalla, Rexhep Mala, and Nuhi Berisha.

In 1999, over half the program was removed in honor of the victims of the Račak massacre.

== Activists Being Commemorated ==
=== Rexhep Malaj ===
Malah was born on March 29, 1951, in Hogosht-Kamenice and moved to Gjilan with his family on May 20, 1965. He attended Zejnel Hajdini High School, but was expelled for organizing political demonstrations. He managed to graduate from another high school and became a teacher, but continued to fight for Kosovo's independence. He joined the National Liberation Movement (Albania) and in 1974 was sentenced to 9 years in prison. After his release, he returned to the liberation movement and was killed by the Serbian Police on January 11, 1984.

=== Nuhi Berisha ===
Nuhi Berisha was born on October 3, 1961, in Svirca of Kamenica. He enrolled in Zejnel Hajdini High School, where he met and befriended Rexhep Mala. The two of them started the newspaper Voice of Kosovo together. Berisha was also a member of the National Liberation Movement, and the two friends died together.

=== Kadri Zeka ===
He was born on April 25, 1953, in the village Poliçkë-Hogosht and studied in Pristina. Zeka was a journalist and a lawyer. After some years he went in Switzerland, where he was active in many Albanian organizations.

=== Jusuf and Bardhosh Gërvalla ===
Jusuf was born on October 1, 1945, in Dubovik. He was a writer, a journalist, and a musician, as well as an activist. Both brothers were killed on 17 January, 1982 in Untergruppenbach. Jusuf was in the process of writing his first novel, Rrotull, which would remain forever unfinished. Jusuf Gërvalla's literary creativity, poetry, and journalism had an important impact in the development of the art and politics in Albania.

A famous quote of Jusuf Gërvalla is, "At the forefront of this nation and to its feet, sacrifice and death for realizing its aspirations, will come to us with glory through life."

== Activities ==
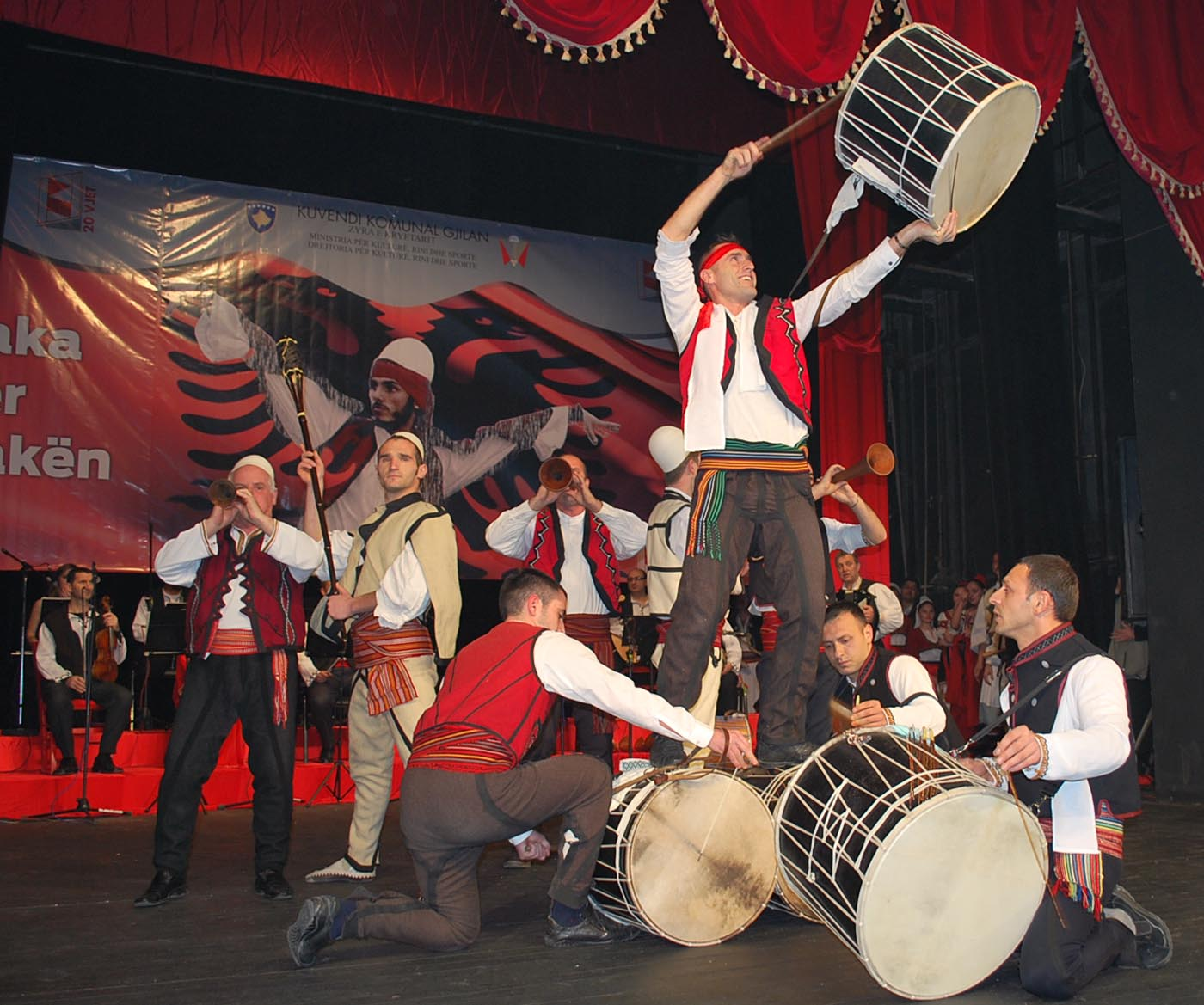
An Albanian dance during "Flaka e Janarit"

- Concert of classical music.
- Brush of Flame: an exhibition of artists where awards are given, most notably "Shopper Gallery".
- Flame's Talia: festival of Albanian drama.
- Flame's Pens: a literary competition.
- Folk Flame: selected songs, dances, and games from the Albanian tradition.
- Xixëllonjat e flakes: music concert for children, presenting smaller soloists.
- Flame's Pentagram: part of the musical event.
- Competition of Enigmatic: contestants are evaluated for accuracy and speed in solving crosswords.
- Flame's Fest: festival of folk songs.

=== Concert of Classical Music ===
This concert is started by ballet. Albanian soloists perform different songs before public. Also there are presented different songs with instruments by them.

=== Brush of flame ===
Is one of the most important pillars of this multicultural event, in the framework of which are allocated three awards of visual arts, and it is given the award "Buyer Gallery" by the professional jury. For visual arts are given these awards:

- Award for the best picture,
- Award for the best sculpture,
- Award for the best graphics.

In this activity, are opened the exhibition in all branches of art, as in the picture, graphic sculpture, artistic photo or conceptual art, where participate creative artists by various Albanian regions.

Year	Winner of "Shopper Gallery" prize
2002	Hajrush Fazliu
2003	Nagip Berisha
2004	Esat Valla
2005	Demush Haziri
2006	Miradije Ramiqi
2007	Avni Behluli
2008	Ramadan Arifi
2009	Demir Behluli
2010	-
2011	Luan Shahiqi
2012	Qamil Llapashtica
2013	Ahmet Ibrahimi
2014	Zejnullah Zejnullahu

Year	Winners for the best pictures		
1993	Rasim Vllasaliu		
1994	Qamil Llapashtica		
1995	Nagip Berisha	Rasim Vllasaliu	Avni Behluli
1996	Luan Shahiqi	Qamil Llapashtica	Avni Behluli
1997	Ahmet Ibrahimi	Hajrush Fazliu	Demush Haziri
1998	Avni Behluli	Sali Musliu	Sabedin Etemi
1999	Rexhep Ferri	Nebih Muriqi	Nagip Berisha
2000	Ramadan Arifi	Valbona Rexhepi	Sabri Shaqiri
2001	Eshref Qahili	Jetullah Haliti	Artan Bajrami
2002	Magbule Xhemajli	Arian Berisha	Adem Dermaku
2003	Ahmet Ibrahimi	Avni Behluli	Fahredin Spahija
2004	Demir Behluli	Bujar Jakupi	Idriz Berisha
2005	Sali Musliu	Valbona Behluli	Veli Blakqori
2006	Ardian Rexhepi	Artan Hajrullahu	Burim Myftiu
2007	Talentet e ri	Yll Kastrati	Lumbardh Behluli
2008	Loreta Ukshini	Agron Mulliqi	Gvozden Andiq
2009	Alije Vokshi	Jeton Rexhepi	Shaip Dubova

=== Flame's talia ===
The Festival of Albanian Drama that has a competitive nature. During this festival are a few performances from Albanian from different regions. After each performance there is a debate where various reviews are provided by appropriate professionals. After all the performances, in this competitive festival are given these awards:

- Award for the best show of the festival,
- Award for the most original text – drama,
- Award for the best director of the festival,
- Award for the best actor(male)in the festival,
- Award for the best actor(female)in the festival,
- Special award for achievement in life,
- Award for the exceptional actor,
- Award for the best secondary role,
- Award for theatrical realities .

=== Flame's pens ===
In the framework of this activity is given the award for " The best poetry ", which is read in the city literary hour. Here are three awards for poetry and short story competition, where the authors do not dare to indicate their identity and if they do not fulfill these criteria, their creations are removed from the competition.

=== Folk flame ===
It is an activity casting Albanian ensembles that interpret dances, games and songs from the Albanian traditions. Also soloists interpret different songs.

=== Xixëllonjat e flakes ===
Is a festival where small soloists interpret. Also groups of dancers interpret different choreography. Part of this activity is and choir of children that are accompanied by younger soloists.

=== Flame's pentagram ===
It is a music part where songs are presented by different singers and groups. This has character in the genre of popular music, folk and modern music. This activity has its agement which is interpreted by singers from Gjilan . At the end of this activity are rewarded the best.

=== Competition of enigmatic ===
It has competitive character, where will be given three awards for three contestants who evaluated for accuracy and speed in solving various crosswords.

=== Fest flame ===
Here are presented singers, dancers, and artists from all Albanian regions, who present Albanian folk. Singers interpret on stage accompanied by the Artistic Musicians Group. Fest Flame also has a competitive nature, where in the end, professional jury selects the best songs of the year, where are given three main awards.

=== Flaka e Janarit today ===
Flaka e Janarit is becoming increasingly popular. Onwards from January 11, the flame of the " Flaka e Janarit " is fired, symbolizing cultural event which respect not only the municipality, but all Kosovo's cities. Flaka e Janarit is being improved in all aspects, where for substantive issue work cultural responsible.
