= Bresalc =

Bresalc: Bresalc (Albanian); Брасаљце/Brasaljce (Serbian)
- Village
- Interactive map of Bresalc
- Coordinates: 42.496363°N 21.404961°E
- Country: Kosovo
- District: Gjilan
- Municipality: Gjilan

Population (2024)
  - Total: 2,195
- Time zone: UTC+1 (Central European Time)
  - Summer (DST): UTC+2 (CEST)

Bresalc/Bresalcë (Albanian: Bresalci/Bresalca) is a village in the District of Gjilan, Kosovo. It is located northwest of Gjilan and southeast of Pristina.

== History ==
Located near the homes of the old imams of the region, the area is known for the ruined Kalaja e Princeshës ("Princess's Castle"), the ancient centerpiece of a community once dominated by Catholics. Remnants of the Catholic legacy remain today, including the foundations of churches at Bukov (now the neighborhood of Berkollët) and at Kroni Plak in Gurishtë (now Gllama). A mosque, built in 1856, was burned down on April 10, 1999, during the Kosovo War.

=== Gallery ===
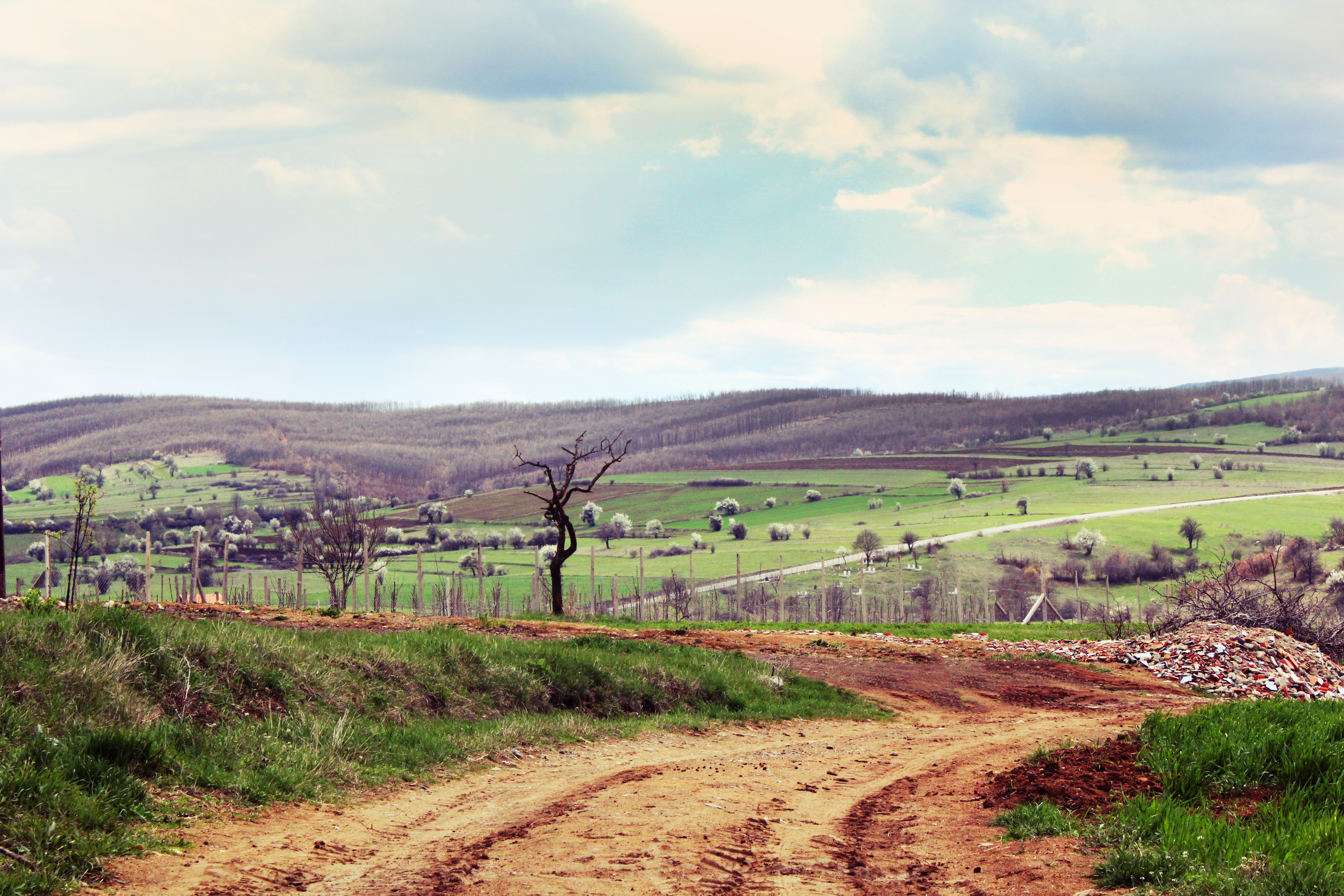

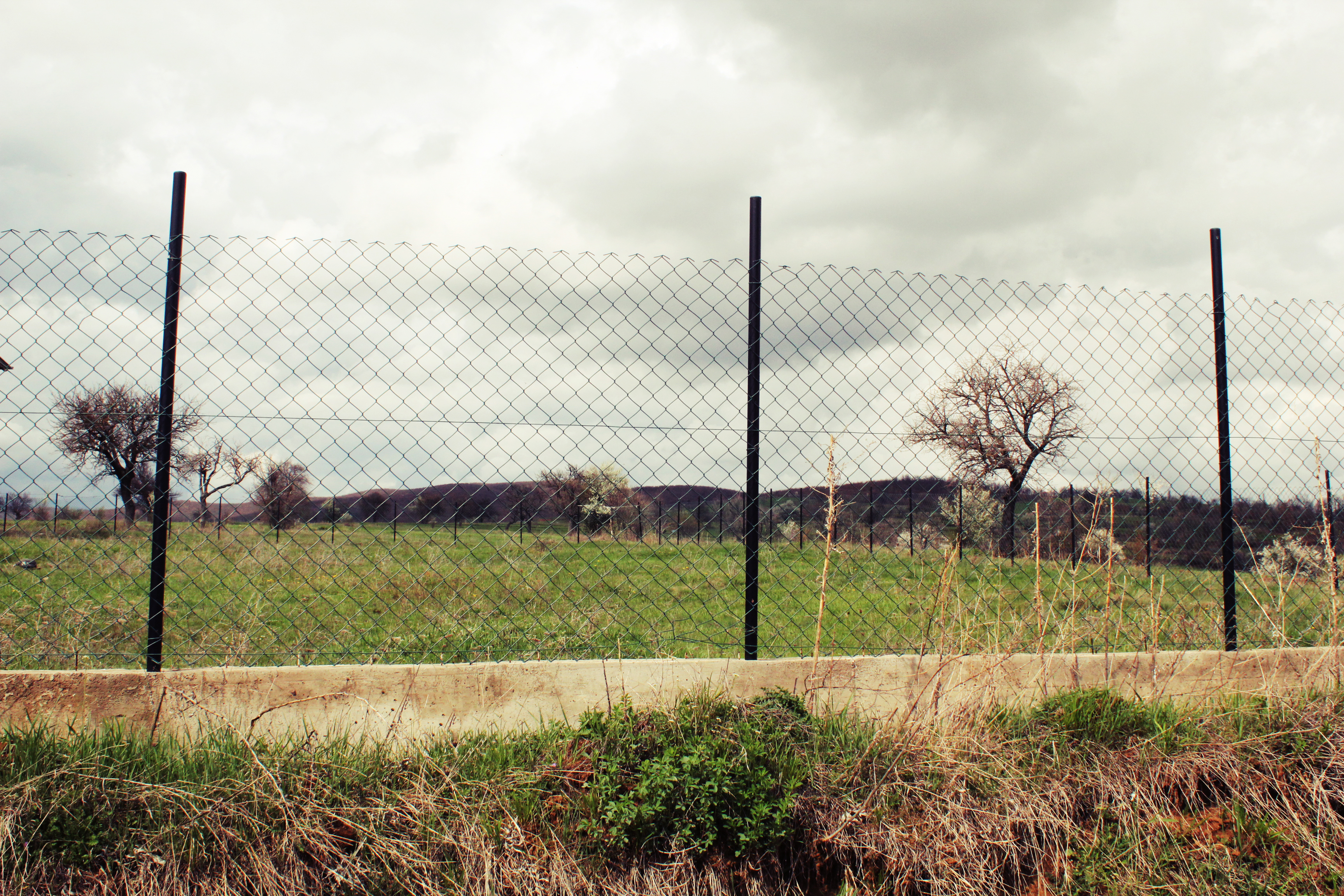

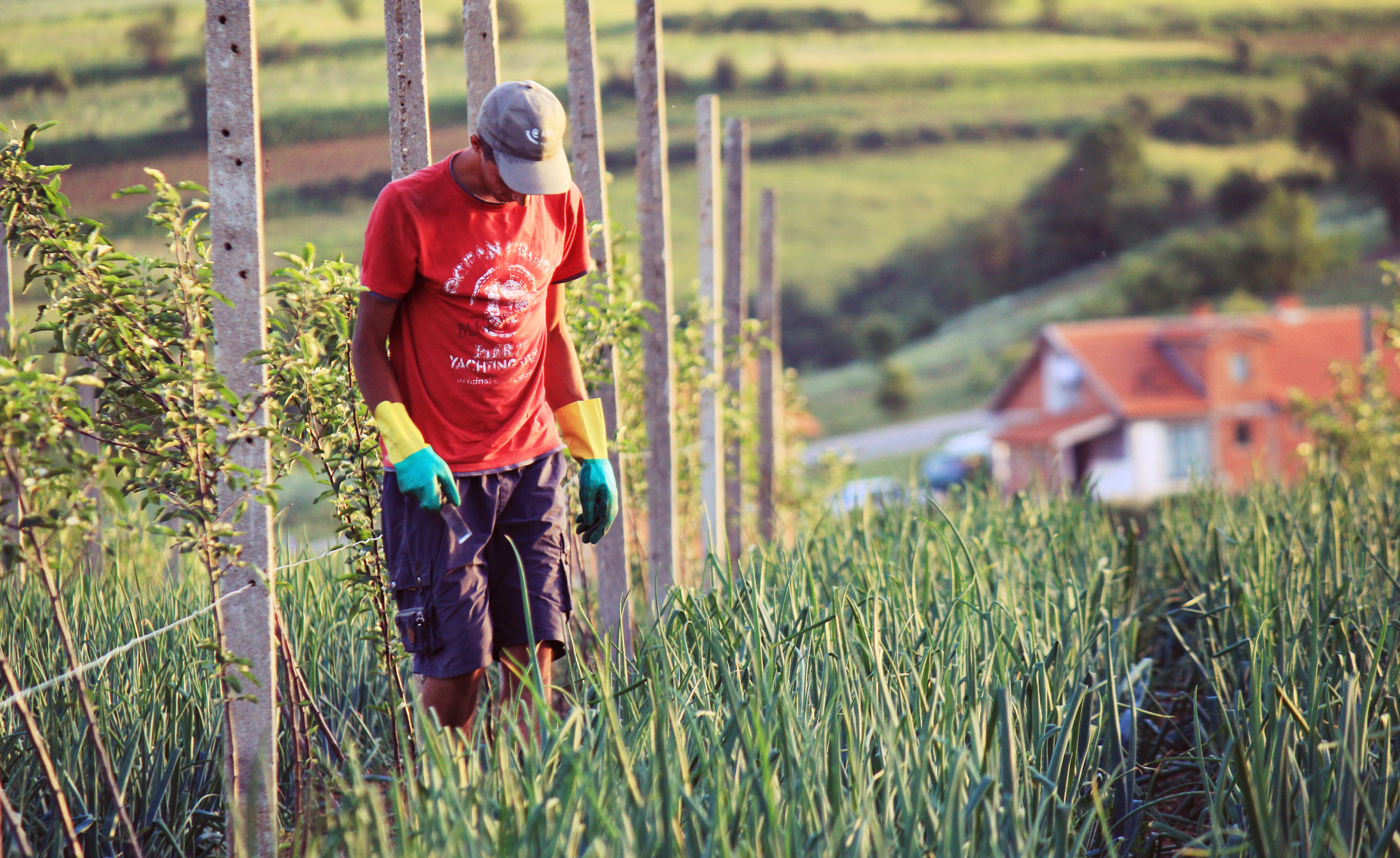

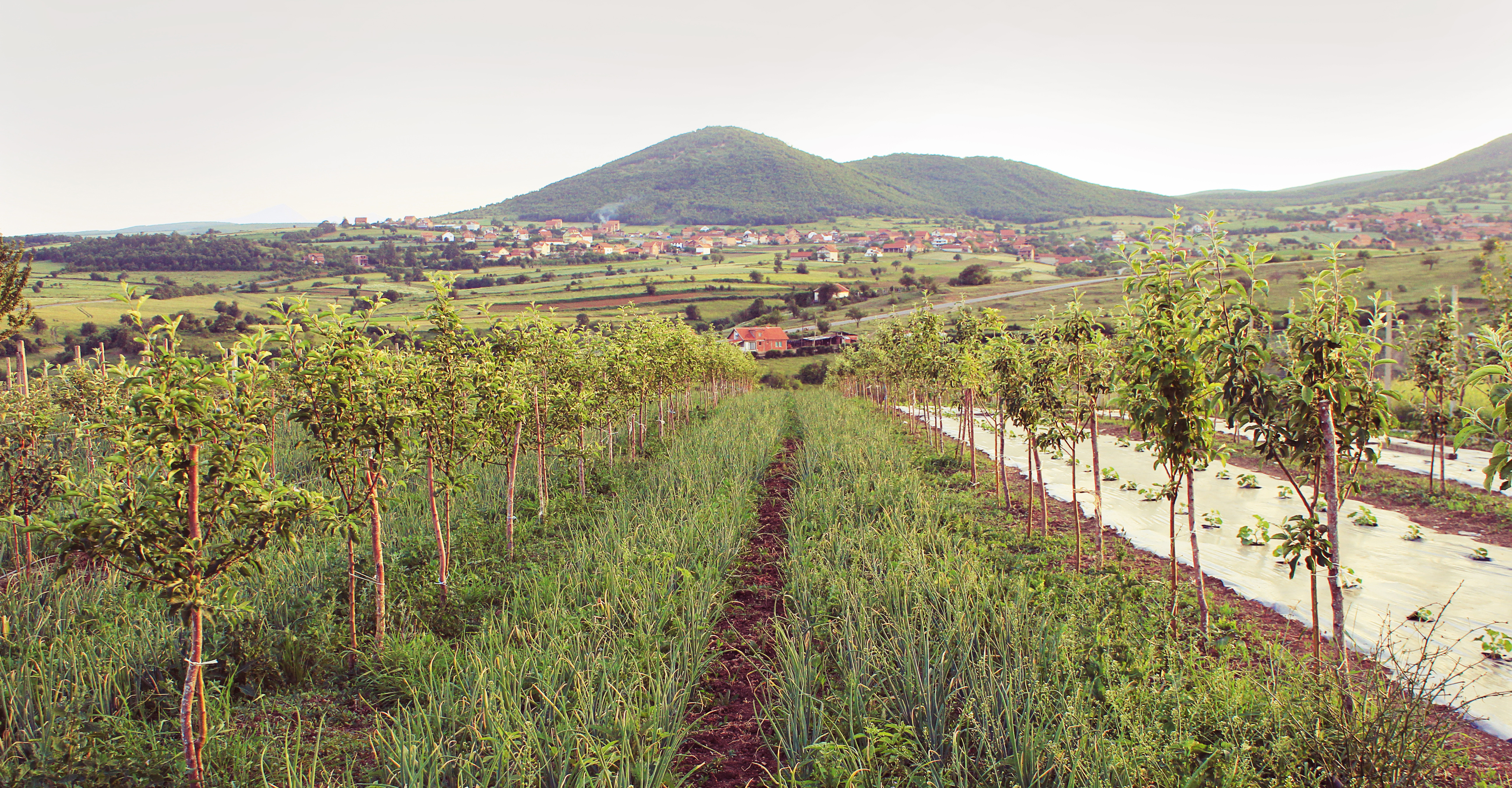

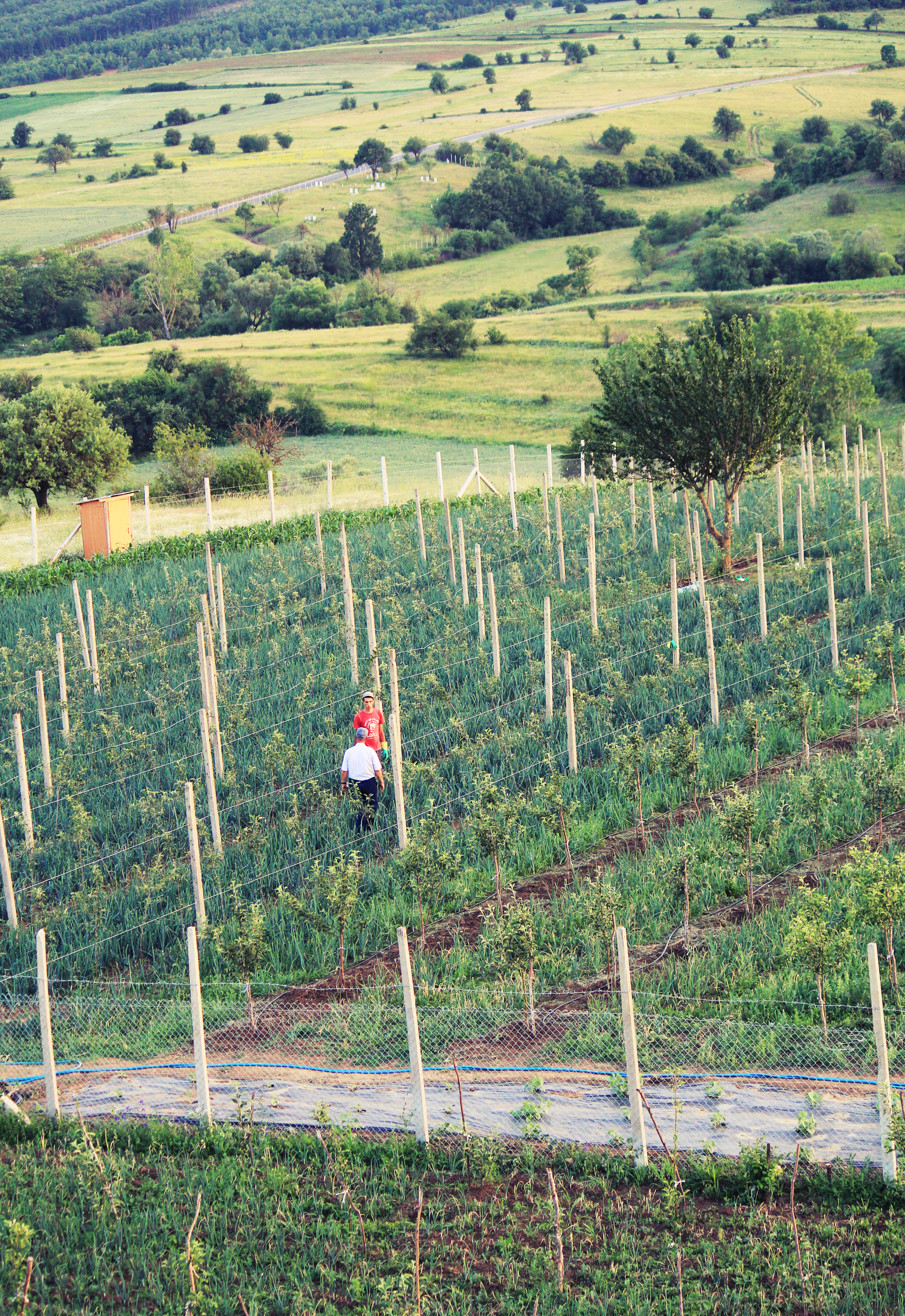

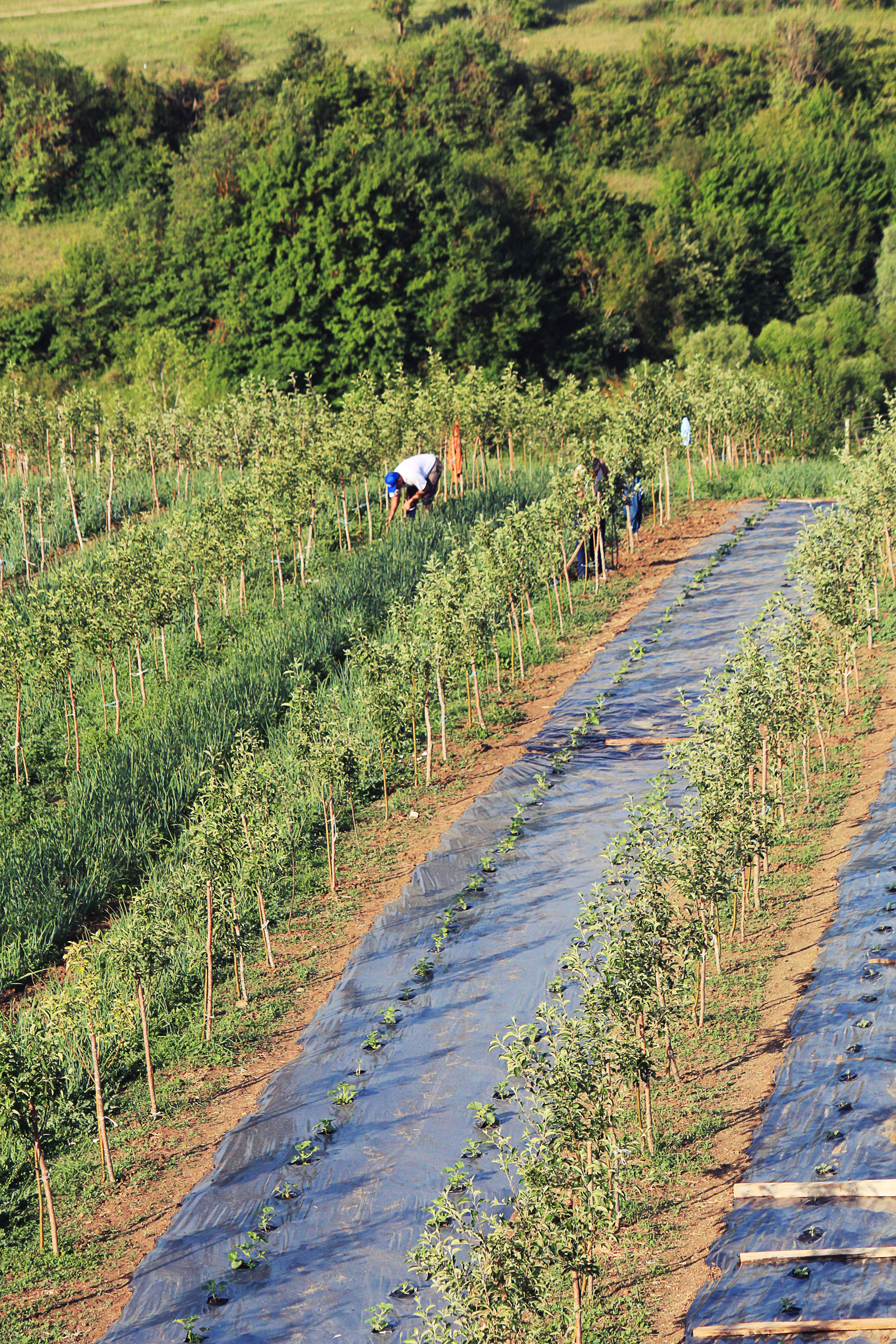
