= Almir Murati =

Swiss footballer (born 1985)

Aljmir Murati
Personal information
- Full name: Aljmir Murati
- Date of birth: 18 September 1985 (age 41)
- Place of birth: Gjilan, SFR Yugoslavia
- Height: 1.83 m (6 ft 0 in)
- Position: Striker

Youth career
- 1996–2001: FC Oerlikon/Polizei
- 2001–2003: SC Young Fellows Juventus

Senior career*
Years	Team	Apps	(Gls)
2003–2005	FC Winterthur	43	(6)
2005–2006	→ SC Young Fellows Juventus (loan)	26	(13)
2006–2007	→ SC Young Fellows Juventus (loan)	7	(9)
2007–2008	SC Cham	24	(8)
2008–2009	FC La Chaux-de-Fonds	15	(2)
2009	→ TuS Koblenz (loan)	7	(0)
2010	Potenza	4	(2)
- * Club domestic league appearances and goals

Aljmir Murati (born 18 September 1985) is a Swiss football player of Kosovar Albanian descent.
