= Stançiq-Bellanoc border crossing =

Border crossing in eastern Europe

Coordinates: 42.2535°N 21.5495°E

Kosovo and North Macedonia have a border crossing located in the village of Stançiq.

The border crossing is 25 kilometres (16 mi) from the city of Kumanovo (in North Macedonia), and 28 kilometres (17 mi) from the city of Gjilan (in Kosovo). It border crossing was opened in 2020.

The construction of the border crossing was supported by financial means from the European Union. The border crossing is open only for the circulation of vehicles, not for the circulation of goods.
