= Đorđe Martinović incident =

1985 incident in Yugoslavia

- Date: 1 May 1985
- Location: Gjilan, SAP Kosovo, SFR Yugoslavia
- Type: Disputed (self-inflicted injury, or violent assault)
- Motive: Disputed (anal masturbation, or land dispute)
- Perpetrators: Disputed (Đorđe Martinović, or two Albanian attackers)
- Outcome: Increased ethnic tensions
- Injuries: 1 (Đorđe Martinović)
- Charges: No charges pursued

Đorđe Martinović (Note: In English also spelled as Djordje Martinovic.) (Serbo-Croatian Cyrillic: Ђорђе Мартиновић; IPA: [d͡ʑôːrd͡ʑe martǐːnoʋit͡ɕ]; 1929 – 6 September 2000) was a Serb farmer from Kosovo who was at the center of a notorious incident in May 1985, when he was treated for injuries caused by the insertion of a glass bottle into his anus. The "Martinović affair", as it became known, turned into a cause célèbre in Yugoslav politics. Although the facts of the incident remained in dispute for years afterwards, it played a role in worsening ethnic tensions between Kosovo's Serb and Albanian populations.

== Incident ==
On 1 May 1985, Đorđe Martinović, a 56-year-old resident of the Kosovan town of Gjilan, arrived at the local hospital with a broken bottle wedged in his rectum. He claimed that he had been attacked by two Albanian men while he was working in his field. After being interrogated by a Yugoslav People's Army colonel, Martinović reportedly admitted that his injuries had been self-inflicted in a botched attempt at masturbation. Public investigators reported that "the prosecutor made a written conclusion from which it appears that the wounded performed an act of 'self-satisfaction' in his field, [that he] put an empty glass bottle of sparkling water on a wooden stick and stuck it in the ground. After that he sat 'on the bottle and enjoyed'." Community leaders in Gjilan subsequently issued a statement describing his injuries as the "accidental consequences of a self-induced [sexual] practice".

He was transferred to Belgrade for further investigations at the prestigious Military Medical Academy, but a medical team there reported that his injuries were not consistent with a self-inflicted wound. The team, which included two doctors from Belgrade and one each from Ljubljana, Zagreb, and Skopje (thus representing four of Yugoslavia's six republics), concluded that the injuries had been caused "by a strong, brutal and sudden insertion or jamming of a 500 ml. bottle, or rather, its wider end, into the rectum" and that it was probably physically impossible for Martinović to have done this to himself. The team argued that the insertion "could only have been carried out by at least two or more individuals".

A second opinion was sought and provided a month later by a commission under Slovenian forensic doctor Janez Milčinski. The Milčinski team concluded that Martinović could have inserted the bottle by positioning it on a stick, which he had pushed into the earth, but had slipped during masturbation and broke the bottle in his rectum under the force of his body's weight. The Yugoslav secret police and military intelligence reportedly concluded from this that Martinović's injuries had indeed most likely been self-inflicted.

In the end, the federal Yugoslav and Serbian authorities did not pursue the case, even after Serbia revoked Kosovo's self-rule in 1989, and no serious attempt appears to have been made to find Martinović's alleged attackers.

== Reactions ==
The case was met with a flood of nationalist and anti-Albanian statements in the Serbian press. This was, in itself, a significant development. The Yugoslav government had for many years made open nationalism a taboo subject, and Yugoslav media outlets had previously systematically downplayed ethnonationalism. The collapse of this taboo in the coverage of the Martinović case heralded the growth of nationalism that was to lead to the country's collapse in 1991.

The Serbian newspaper Politika asserted that the individuals who had allegedly attacked Martinović were members of a local Albanian family who wanted to purchase land that Martinović refused to sell. The claim had considerable resonance in Serbian politics; the steady exodus of Serbs from Kosovo was seen as being the result of deliberate persecution of Serbs by Albanians seeking to drive them off their land and seize their property.

Many analogies were made with the Ottoman Turks, who had ruled Serbia until 1833 (and Kosovo until 1912). The incident was widely compared with the Ottoman use of impalement as a means of torture and execution. This link was explicitly made in poetry commemorating the incident, which invoked "Ottoman" themes; for instance:

With a broken bottle
On a stake
As though through
a lamb
but alive,
they went through Đorđe Martinović
As if with their first and heavy steps into their future field they treaded ...
When out of the opium and pain
Đorđe Martinović came round
As if from the long past
Turkish times
He woke up on a stake.

Such comparisons were given added impact by the legendary nature of impalement as one of the most dreaded punishments inflicted by the Ottomans, and the role that impalement as a metaphor for Ottoman oppression played in Serbian culture.

Others compared the incident to other historical episodes of persecution of Serbs and Christians, elevating Martinović to "an archetype of Serb suffering and Albanian (Muslim, Ottoman...) evil". The writer Branislav Crnčević declared Martinović's experience to be "Jasenovac for one man" (referring to the Jasenovac concentration camp, where tens of thousands of Serbs were massacred during World War II). The painter Mića Popović created a huge painting based on Jusepe de Ribera's The Martyrdom of Saint Philip, depicting skullcap-wearing Albanians hoisting Martinović on a wooden cross. One of the Albanians is depicted holding a glass bottle in his hand.

A petition signed by Serbian intellectuals asserted that "the case of Đorđe Martinović has become that of the entire Serb nation in Kosovo". Three years later, a group of Serbian women marched on the Serbian parliament to lobby for the removal of Kosovo's autonomy, declaring that "we can no longer stand by while ... our brothers are impaled on a sharpened stake".

Martinović's cause was adopted by the Association of Writers of Serbia, which found its 1985 assembly (held on 16 June) dominated by discussion of the Martinović affair. The literary critic Zoran Gluščević compared the situation faced by the Serbian minority in Kosovo to "the most frightening fascist experiences of the Second World War". Recalling the turn-of-the-century Dreyfus affair in France and the role played by writers such as Émile Zola in that case, Gluščević called upon the association to act in defence of Martinović. His motion was passed overwhelmingly and the association adopted an open letter which demanded that the Serbian parliament establish a committee to investigate the Martinović case. The Serbian writer Dobrica Ćosić established (as he put it) "intensive cooperation" with Serbian groups in Kosovo and helped Martinović to hire a lawyer and bring charges against officials who, it was asserted, had forced Martinović to sign a false confession. He also wrote on Martinović's behalf to the Serbian President, Ivan Stambolić, and the Federal Ministry of Defence.

The Martinović case was held by some Serb nationalist ideologues, intellectuals and politicians to symbolise a supposed Muslim penchant for sodomy. An influential psychiatrist and Krajina Serb nationalist activist, Jovan Rašković, argued that "Muslims [are] fixated in the anal phase of their psychosocial development and [are] therefore characterized by general aggressiveness and an obsession with precision and cleanliness". It was seen by many Serbs as a prime example of how Albanians were (in their view) mistreating Serbs while the Albanian-run Kosovo government "looked the other way".

For their part, many Kosovo Albanians took the view that (as indicated by Martinović's early confession) he had accidentally inflicted the wound on himself and tried to cover it up by blaming it on Albanians, enabling Serbian nationalists to exploit it to provoke anti-Albanian feelings. Others acknowledged that the evidence was unclear, but objected to the way that the case had been used to symbolise the Serbian–Albanian relationship.

The prevalent opinion in Slovenia and Croatia was wariness of Serb nationalism and that the Martinović case was merely a pretext to force a change to the Yugoslav Constitution to give Serbia full control over its two autonomous provinces.

== See also ==
- Propaganda during the Yugoslav Wars
- Vojko i Savle
- Martin Šmíd
