= Gjilan =

City in Kosovo

Gjilan: Gjilan or Gjilani (Albanian) Gnjilane or Гњилане (Serbian)
- City and municipality
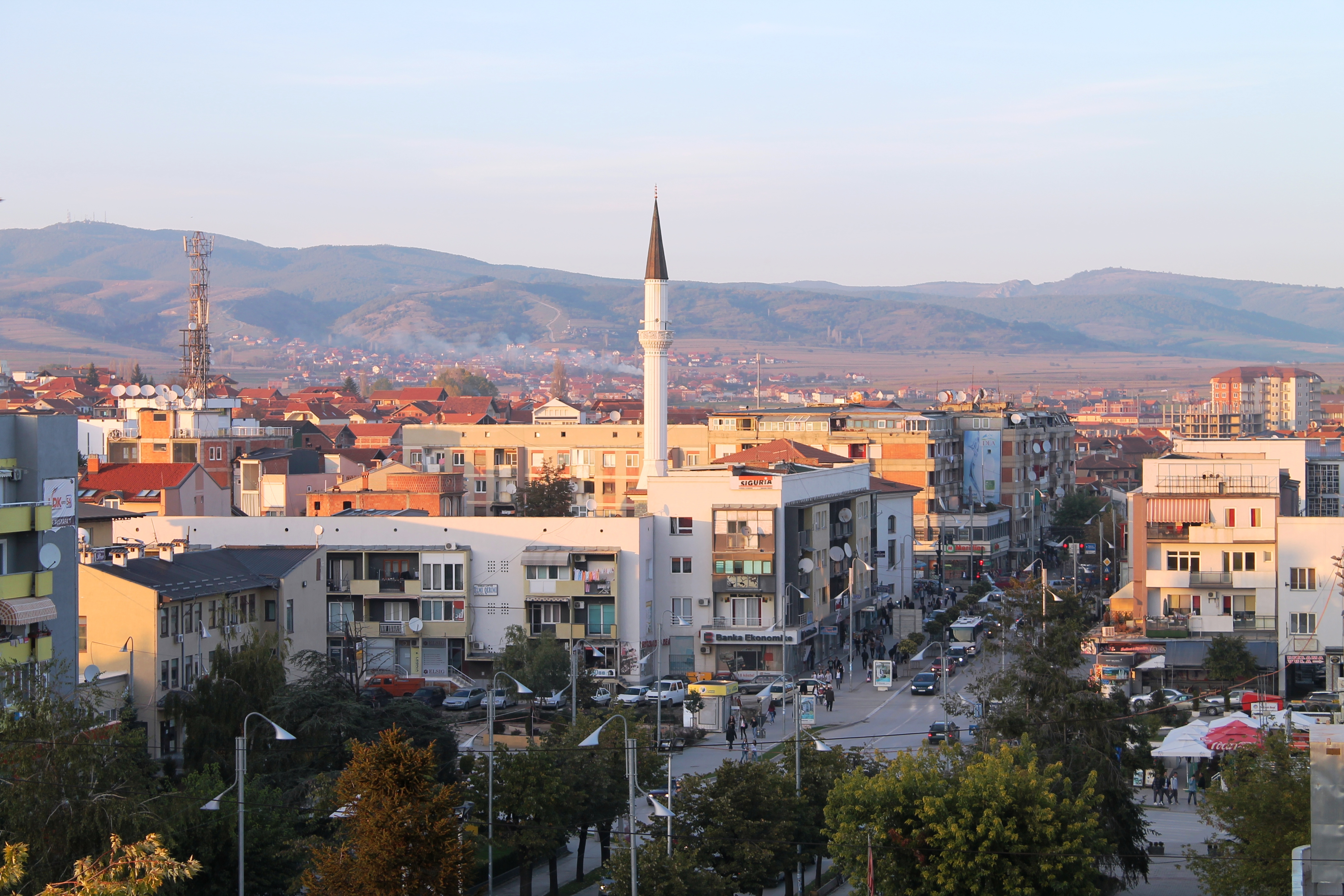
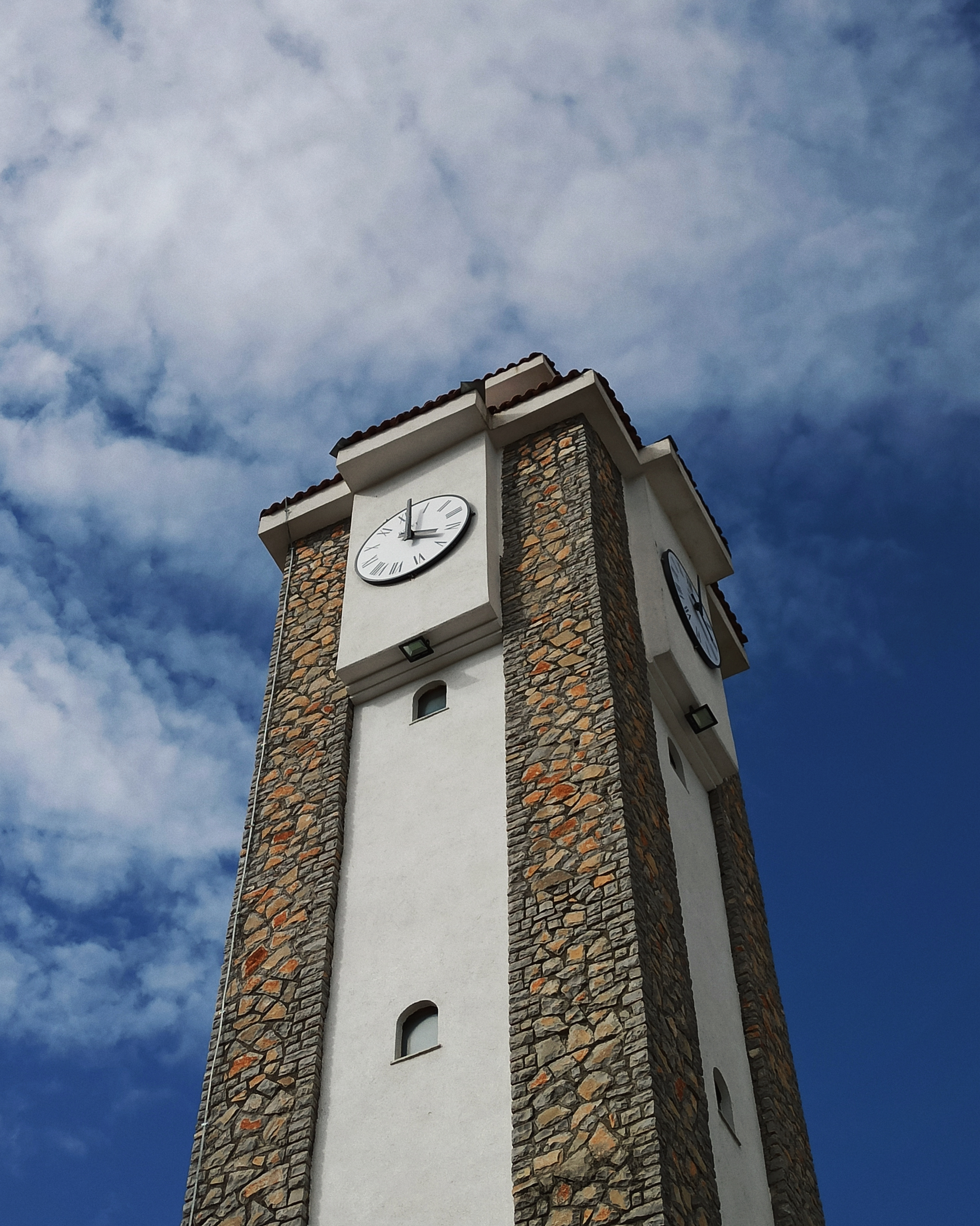
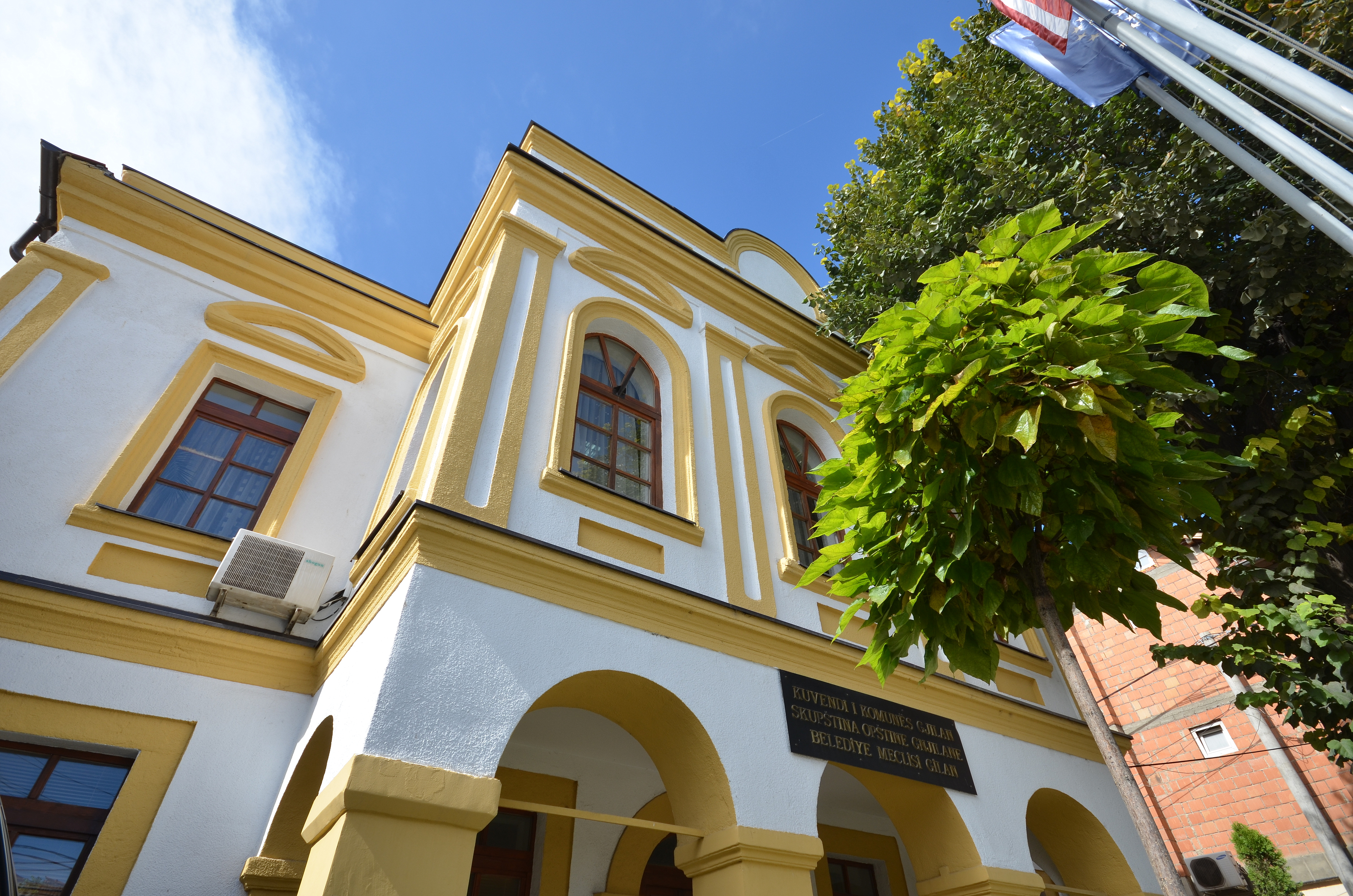
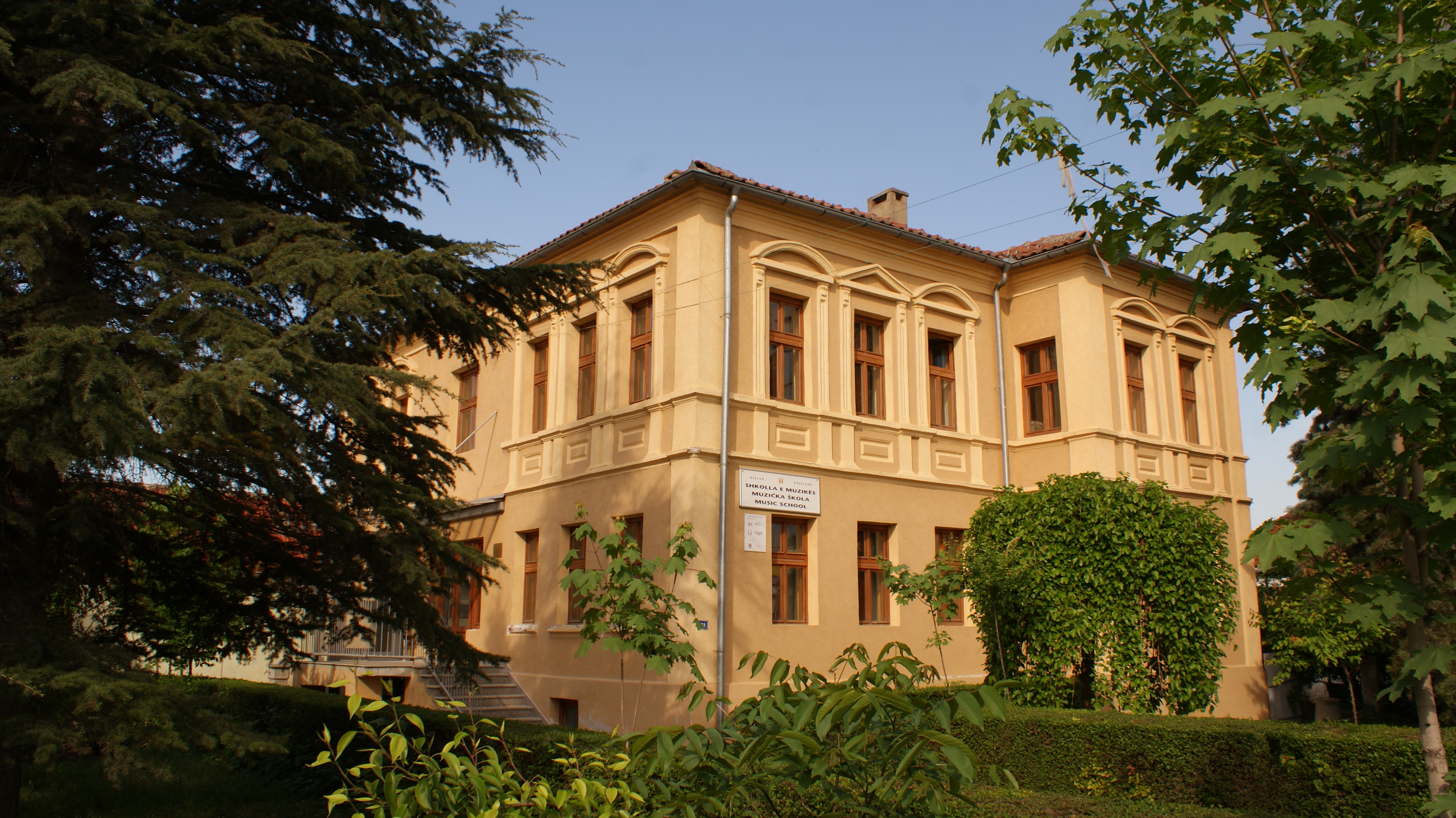
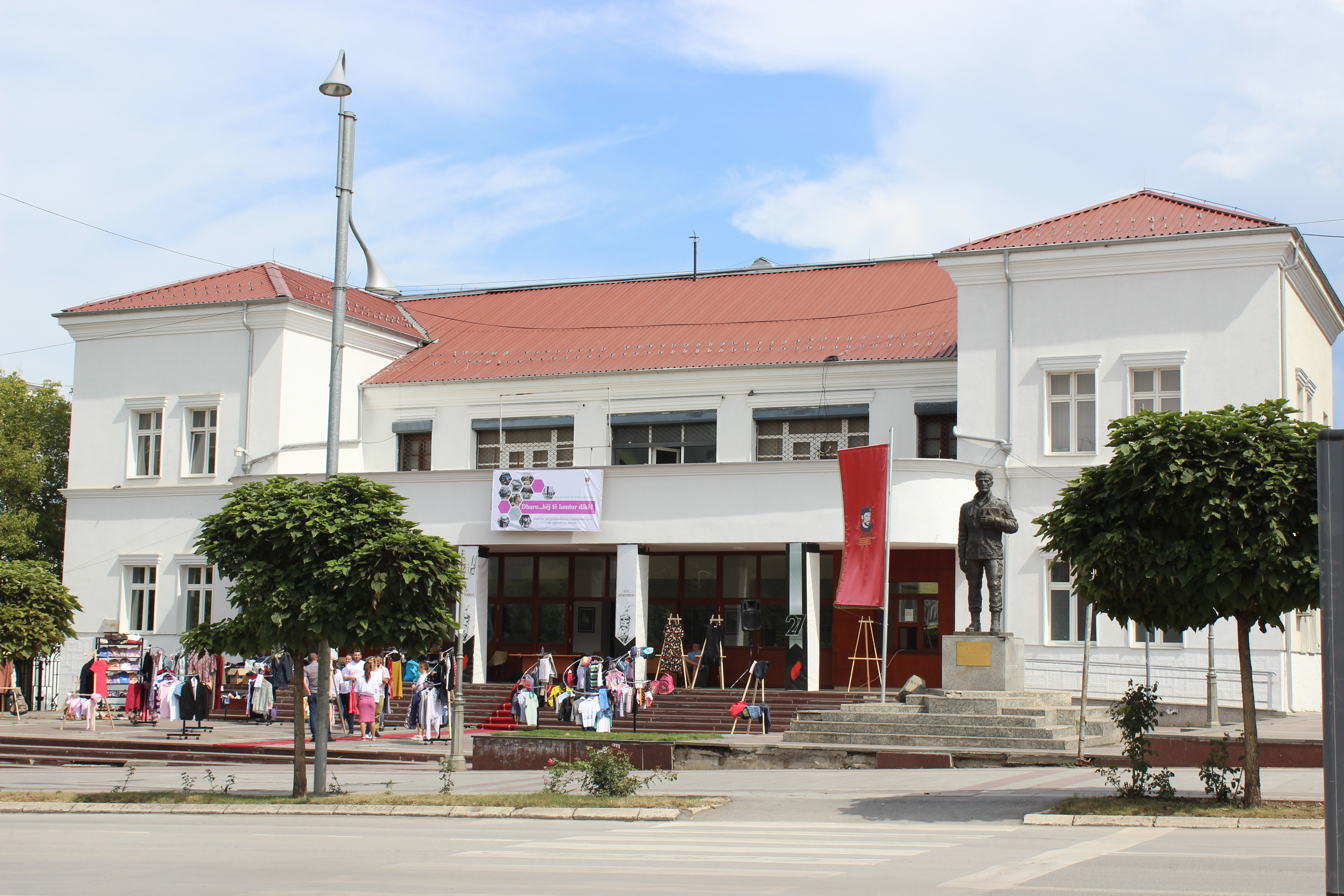
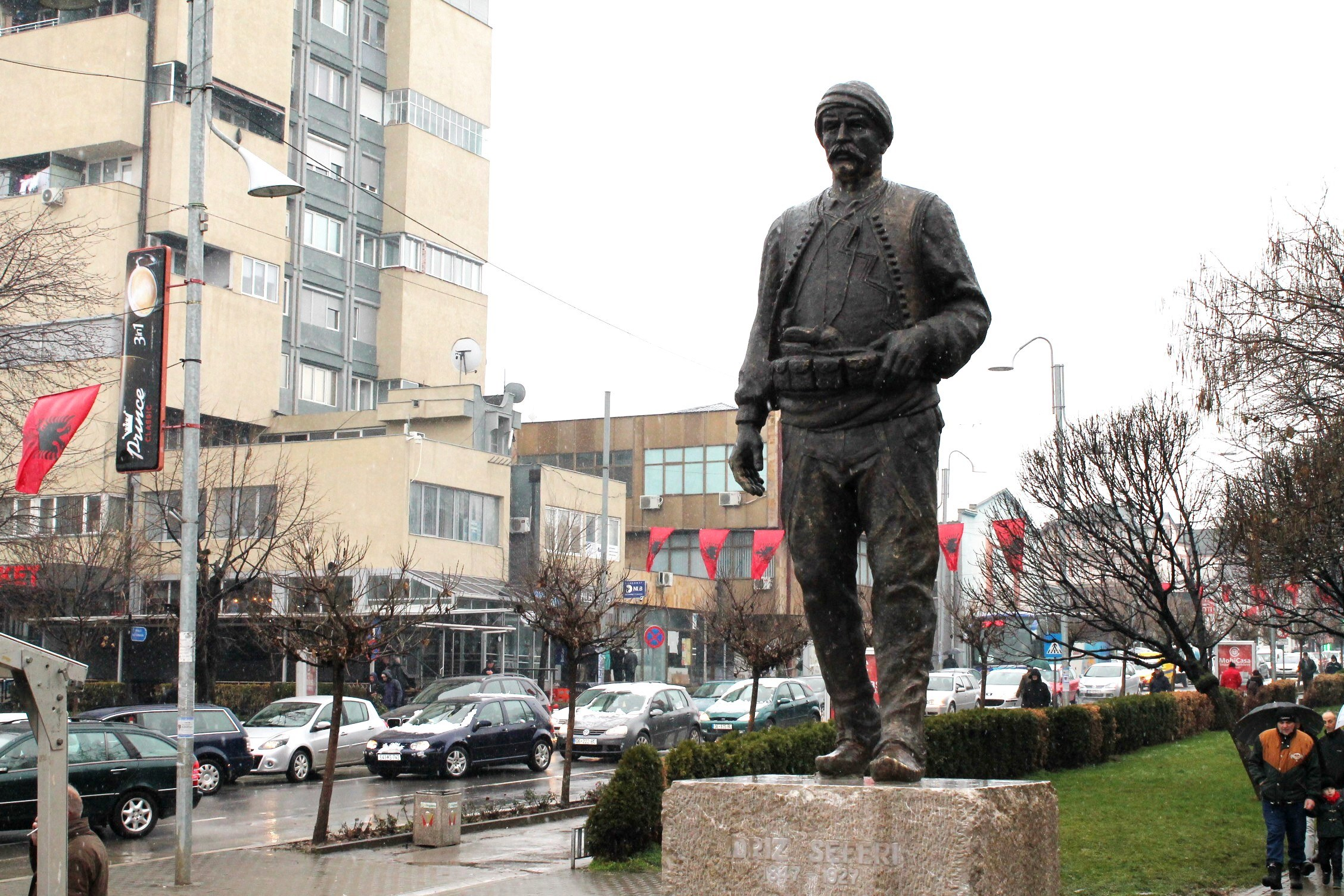
- View over Gjilan Clock Tower Regional Museum School of Music Martyrs' Hill City Theatre Statue of Idriz Seferi

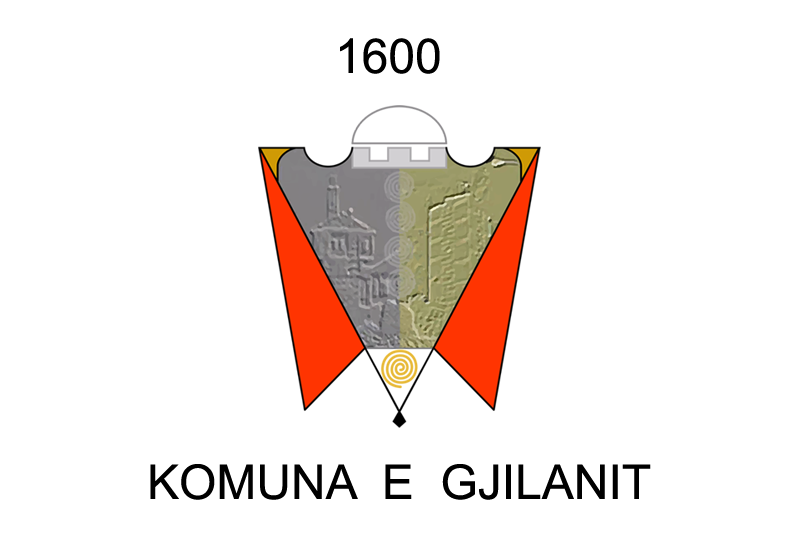
- Flag Seal
- Interactive map of Gjilan
- Location within Kosovo
- Coordinates: 42°27′53″N 21°28′1″E
- Country: Kosovo
- District: Gjilan

Government
  - Type: Mayor–council
  - Mayor: Alban Hyseni (LVV)
  - Council: Gjilan Municipal Council

Area
  - Municipality: 391.84 km^{2} (151.29 sq mi)
  - Rank: 10th in Kosovo

Population (2024)
  - Municipality: 82,901
  - Rank: 4th in Kosovo
  - Urban: 53,279
  - Ethnicity: 97.38% Albanians; 2.62% Other
- Demonym(s): Albanian: Gjilanas (m), Gjilanase (f)
- Time zone: UTC+1 (CET)
  - Summer (DST): UTC+2 (CEST)
- Postal code: 60000
- Area code: +383 (0) 28
- Vehicle registration: 06
- Website: kk.rks-gov.net/gjilan/

Gjilan [(Albanian definite form: Gjilani), or Gnjilane (Serbian Cyrillic: Гњилане)], is the fourth-largest city in Kosovo, functioning as both a municipality and the administrative centre of the Gjilan District. According to the 2024 census, the municipality has a population of 82,901, with the majority of residents living in the city itself.

The city lies in eastern Kosovo, within the Anamorava region, and enjoys strong transport links to the capital, Pristina, as well as to surrounding cities including Ferizaj, Kamenica, Preševo and Bujanovac.

== Etymology ==
The etymology of Gjilan remains disputed. According to Albanian sources, the town—originally a village—derives its name from Bahti Beg Gjinolli of the Gjinaj clan, which ruled the Vushtrri region (including Llap and Drenica) and settled the area around 1750.

Alternatively, the toponym derives from the Serbian adjective gnjil (гњил), meaning “rotten,” “decayed,” or “marshy.” In place-name usage, this root often referred not to decay in a negative sense, but to wet, marshy, or waterlogged land, especially areas with stagnant water or rich, soft soil. The suffix -ane is a common Slavic toponymic ending indicating a place associated with a characteristic or condition. Gnjilane originally meant “the marshy place” or “settlement on wet ground.”

== History ==
In 1342, a place called Morava was visited by Serbian King Stefan Dušan (later Emperor, r. 1331–1355). A fort was built nearby in the 14th century. Gornja Morava ("Upper Morava") was known simply as Morava under Ottoman rule, and it extended west of the Upper Žegra–Budriga–Cernica line, thus Gjilan stayed in the oblast (province) of Topanica, whose provincial seat was Novo Brdo.

In the 1455 Ottoman defter of the District of Branković, there were 41 Christian households registered in Gjilan. The town was served by the priest Božidar. After the conquest of Kosovo by the Ottoman Empire, Islam was introduced to the region.

Haji Kalfa (first half of the 17th century) mentions Morava being 17 days from Constantinople. Gornja Morava and Izmornik were organised into the Sanjak of Viçitrina up until the 18th century. Gjilan became a kadiluk around 1780, and 20–25 years later a large village.

The exact date of Gjilan’s establishment remains uncertain. In the 17th century, the Ottoman traveller Evliya Çelebi referred to the settlement as Morava, describing it as a cadillac within the Sanjak of Vučitrn. Local tradition suggests that Gjilan emerged as a settlement around 1750 and developed into an urban centre by 1772. Its growth was closely linked to the decline of Novo Brdo, which in the Middle Ages was among the largest commercial, economic, and mining centres in the Balkans. In the second half of the 19th century, the feudal Gjinaj family relocated from Novo Brdo and built their residences in the area that is now Gjilan, further shaping the town’s development.

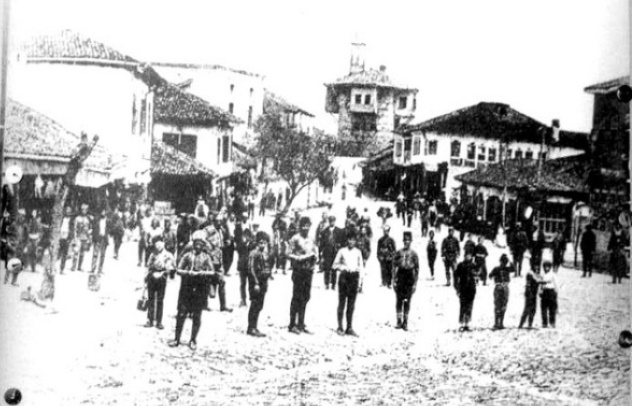
Centre of Gjilan with the clock tower (1915)

=== Modern history ===
In 1985, Gjilan was the site of an incident involving a Serb farmer who had a glass bottle shatter inside his rectum, before going to the local police and blaming two Kosovar Albanians. The incident served to increase and inflame ethnic tensions throughout Yugoslavia, namely between Serbs and Albanians. The farmer later admitted that he put the glass bottle inside his rectum himself.

In 1999, Camp Monteith was established outside the city as a base of operations for KFOR during Operation Joint Guardian, on the site of a destroyed Yugoslav military base which was handed over to the Kosovo Protection Corps in 2007 after the U.S. military downsized their number of troops. Gjilan has also served as the regional headquarters of the UNMIK International Police task force from 1999.

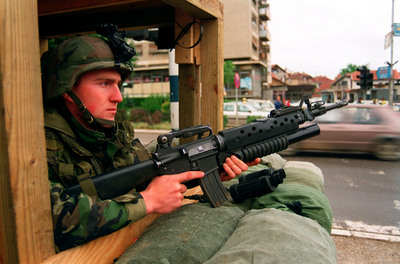
KFOR peacekeeper in Gjilan in mid-1999, in the aftermath of the Kosovo War.

On 24 April 2002, a 5.7-magnitude earthquake struck the municipality of Gjilan, resulting in one fatality.

In 2020, the cities of Gjilan and Kumanovo, North Macedonia came closer through a new border point which was built in the village of Stançiq.

== Geography ==
Gjilan is located in the southeastern part of Kosovo, in the region of Anamorava.

It is 46 km (29 mi) from Pristina, 27 km (17 mi) from Kamenica, 25 km (16 mi) from Novo Brdo and 22 km (14 mi) from Vitia. The municipalities of the region are bordered in the southeast by Preševo (33 km (21 mi)) and Kumanovo (53 km (33 mi)), and in the east by Bujanovac (40 km (25 mi)).

The Gjilan area is defined by the Morava e Binçës, which collects all the small rivers, with an average monthly flow rate of 6.7 cubic metres/second. In the southeast it is surrounded by the mountains of Karadak.

=== Climate ===
Gjilan has a humid subtropical climate (Cfa) as of the Köppen climate classification with an average annual temperature of 10.9 °C (51.6 °F). The warmest month in Gjilan is August with an average temperature of 22.1 °C (71.8 °F), while the coldest month is January with an average temperature of −0.5 °C (31.1 °F).

== Economy ==
As of 2018, the municipality had 4,100 registered private businesses employing approximately 6,900 people.

Before 1999, Gjilan was a significant industrial hub in Kosovo. Today, the radiator factory remains operational, along with the tobacco factory, which has recently been privatised. In addition, a new business incubator, supported by the European Agency for Reconstruction, was inaugurated in the summer of 2007.

== Demographics ==
Historical population
Year	Pop.	±% p.a.
1953	48,748	—
1961	52,415	+0.91%
1971	67,893	+2.62%
1981	84,085	+2.16%
1991	103,675	+2.12%
2011	90,178	−0.69%
2024	82,901	−0.65%
Source: Division of Kosovo

According to the 2024 census, Gjilan has a population of 82,901, ranking as the fourth-largest city in Kosovo.

Gjilan has historically maintained a mixed population, though Albanians have constituted the predominant majority during both the Ottoman and Serbian-Yugoslav periods.

According to the 2011 census, the municipality of Gjilan had 90,178 inhabitants. The population consisted of 87,814 Albanians (97.38%), 978 Turks (1.08%), 624 Serbs (0.69%), 121 (0.13%) Bosniaks, and 541 (0.60%) from smaller groups, including Roma, Ashkali, Gorani and Egyptians. In the city live 54,239 inhabitants, while in rural areas – 35,939. Division of population by gender: male – 45,354, female – 44,824.

Albanian, Serbian and Turkish are all official languages in the municipality.

== Education ==
Gjilan offers a comprehensive education system encompassing pre-school, primary, and secondary levels, as well as higher education through the public Kadri Zeka University. In 2018, the municipality recorded 12,370 students enrolled across 29 primary schools, including 12,023 ethnic Albanians and 347 students from minority communities such as Serbs, Roma, and Turks. At the secondary level, nine schools served 5,650 students, of whom 5,449 were Albanians, with the remainder representing minority groups.

== Culture ==
Built in 1944, the City Theatre of Gjilan is the city’s principal cultural institution. In 2024, it staged 116 performances and premieres, attracting more than 16,000 visitors.

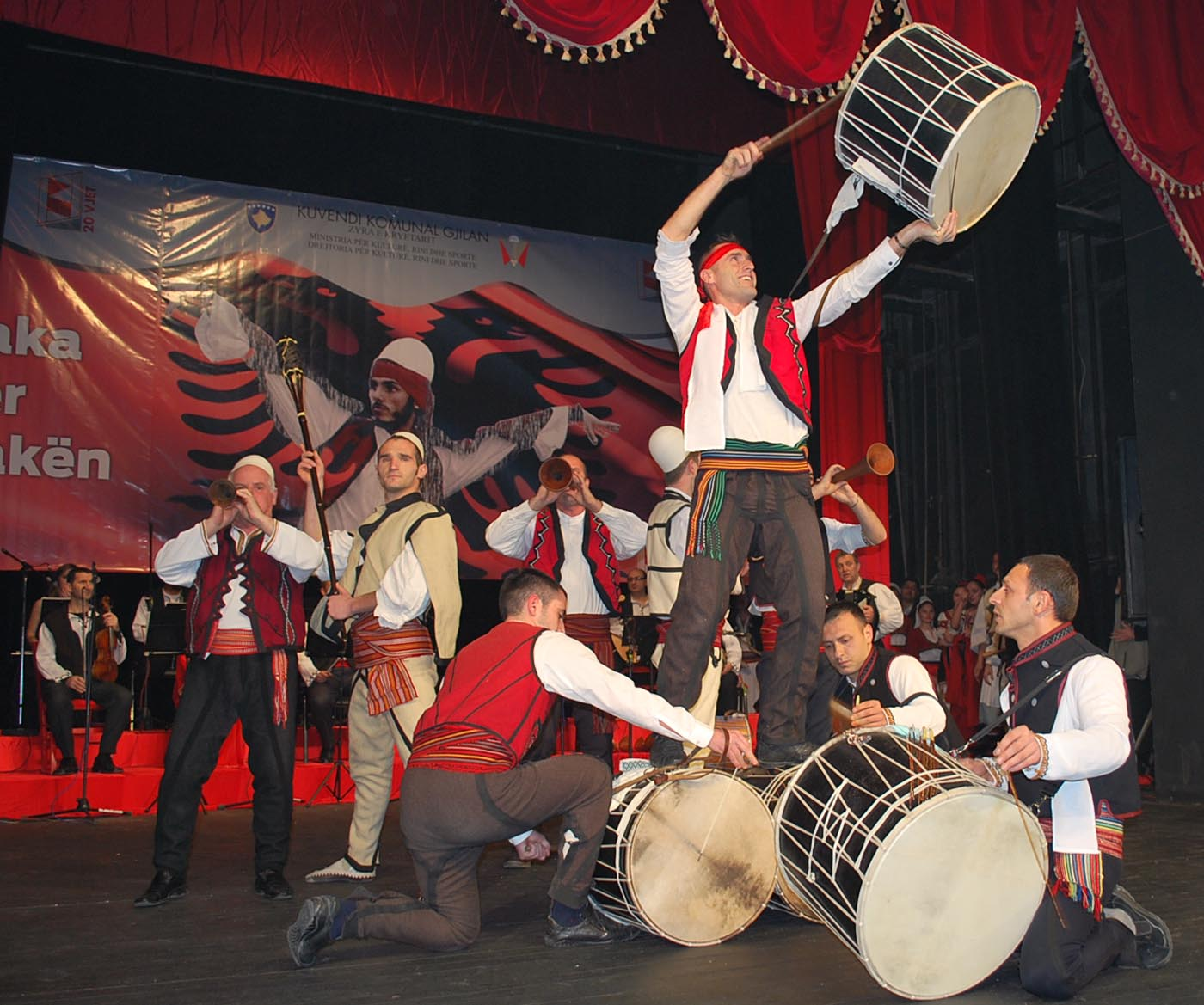
An Albanian traditional dance during the event of Flaka e Janarit

There are 41 mosques in Gjilan.

=== Flaka e Janarit ===
“Flaka e Janarit” is a cultural festival held annually in Gjilan, beginning on 11 January with the symbolic lighting of the flame and continuing until 31 January with a diverse programme of artistic activities. The event brings together thousands of artists and art enthusiasts from across Albanian-speaking regions, transforming the city into a vibrant cultural hub for three consecutive weeks. Dedicated to honouring national martyrs through artistic expression, the festival was first organised to mark the tenth anniversary of the assassination of writer, activist, and patriot Jusuf Gërvalla, alongside Kadri Zeka and Bardhosh Gërvalla. Coinciding with the date of their deaths on 11 January, the event was named “Flaka e Janarit” (The Flame of January).

== Sports ==
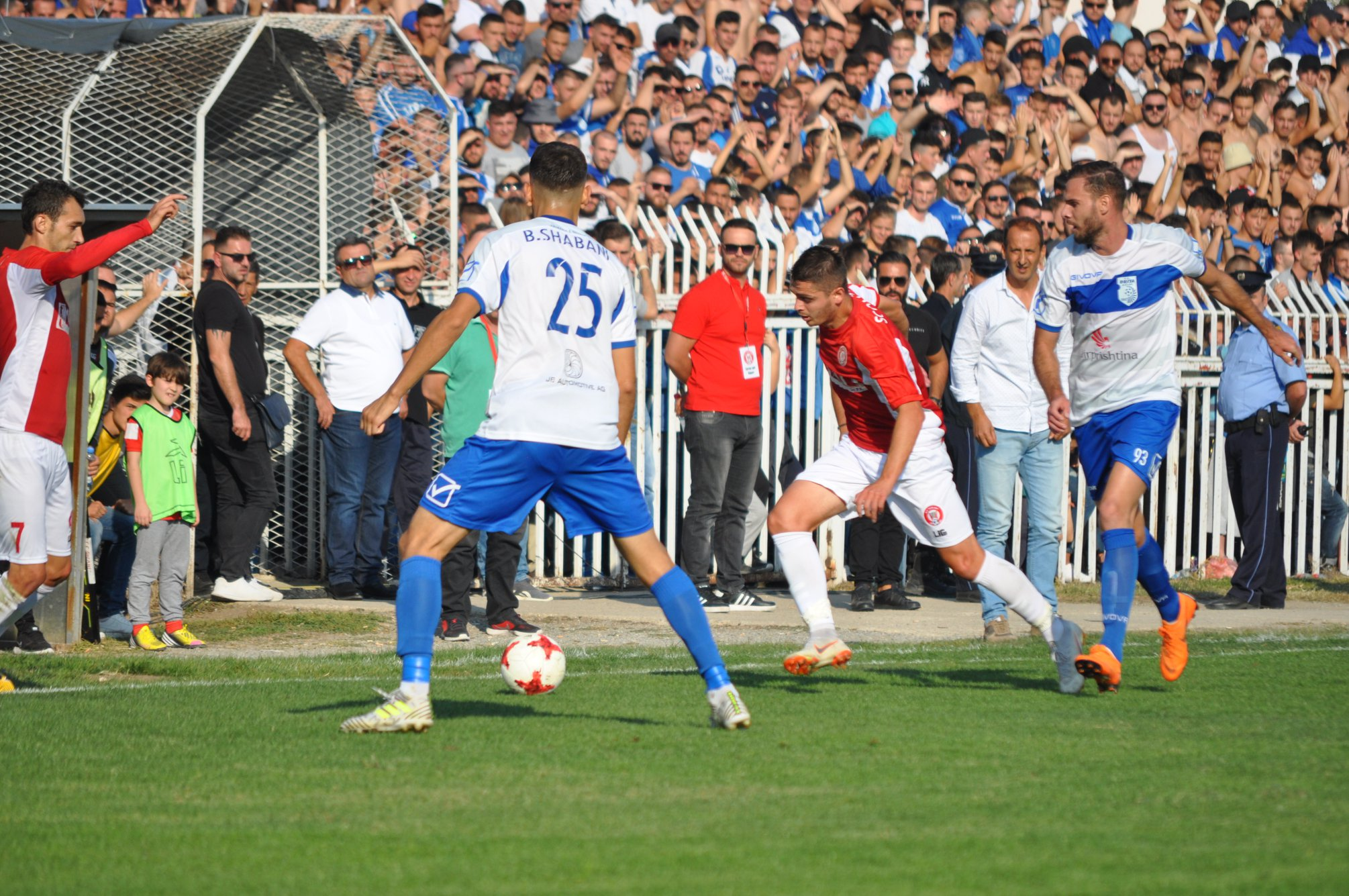
The Gjilan derby is a football rivalry between fierce rivals FC Drita and SC Gjilani

Gjilan is home to the basketball club KB Drita, the football clubs SC Gjilani and FC Drita, and the volleyball club KV Drita. It also has the KF Bashkimi Gjilan football club which competes in the Third League.

Gjilan hosts the biggest derby in Kosovo, the Kosovo Derby, between FC Drita and SC Gjilani. Both of the clubs are from the city, which draw thousands of viewers inside the Gjilan City Stadium.

== Transport ==
Gjilan is linked to its surrounding settlements mainly by a network of roads. It is connected to the capital of Kosovo, Pristina, via the national road N25.2.

A highway that connects Gjilan with Pristina is being built, as well as connecting with the city of Kamenica. The highway which is 47 kilometres long, is expected to be completed in early 2025.

== Notable people ==
- Idriz Seferi (b.1847), Albanian patriot
- Mulla Idriz Gjilani (b.1901), Albanian patriot
- Zoran Antić (b. 1975), Serbian footballer
- Faton Bislimi (b. 1983), Kosovan author
- Nijazi Ramadani (b. 1964), Kosovan poetry writer
- Albert Bunjaku (b. 1983), Kosovan footballer
- Daut Dauti (b. 1960), Kosovan author
- Dragan Dimić (b. 1981), Serbian footballer
- Bajram Haliti (b. 1955), Romani writer
- Shpëtim Hasani (b. 1982), Kosovan footballer
- Lutfi Haziri (b. 1969), Kosovan politician
- Genta Ismajli (b. 1985), Kosovan singer
- Aljmir Murati (b. 1985), Swiss footballer
- Zenun Pajaziti (b. 1966), Kosovan politician
- Xherdan Shaqiri (b. 1991), Swiss footballer
- Jahi Jahiu, (b. 1959), Kosovan artist
- Mira Stupica (b. 1923), Serbian actress
- Goran Svilanović (b. 1963), Serbian politician
- Faton Toski (b. 1987), Kosovan footballer
- Agim Ramadani (b. 1963), KLA commander
- Abdullah Tahiri (1956–1999), KLA commander
- Antun Marković (b. 1992), Croatian footballer
- Lirim Hajrullahu (b. 1990), Canadian CFL kicker
- Đorđe Martinović (1929–2000), farmer

== Twin towns – sister cities ==
Gjilan is twinned with:

- Kumanovo, North Macedonia
- Nazilli, Turkey
- Sarandë, Albania
- Sioux City, United States
- Yıldırım, Turkey

== See also ==
- University of Gjilan

== Sources ==
- Kalezić, Dimitrije M. (2002). A – Z. Savremena administracija. ISBN 9788638706716.
- Urošević, Atanasije; Macura, Miloš (1987). Etnički procesi na Kosovu tokom turske vladavine [Ethnic Processes in Kosovo during Turkish Rule]. Srpska akademija nauka i umetnosti. ISBN 8670250152.
