= The Martyrdom of Saint Philip =

Painting by Jusepe de Ribera

- Martirio de san Felipe (Spanish)
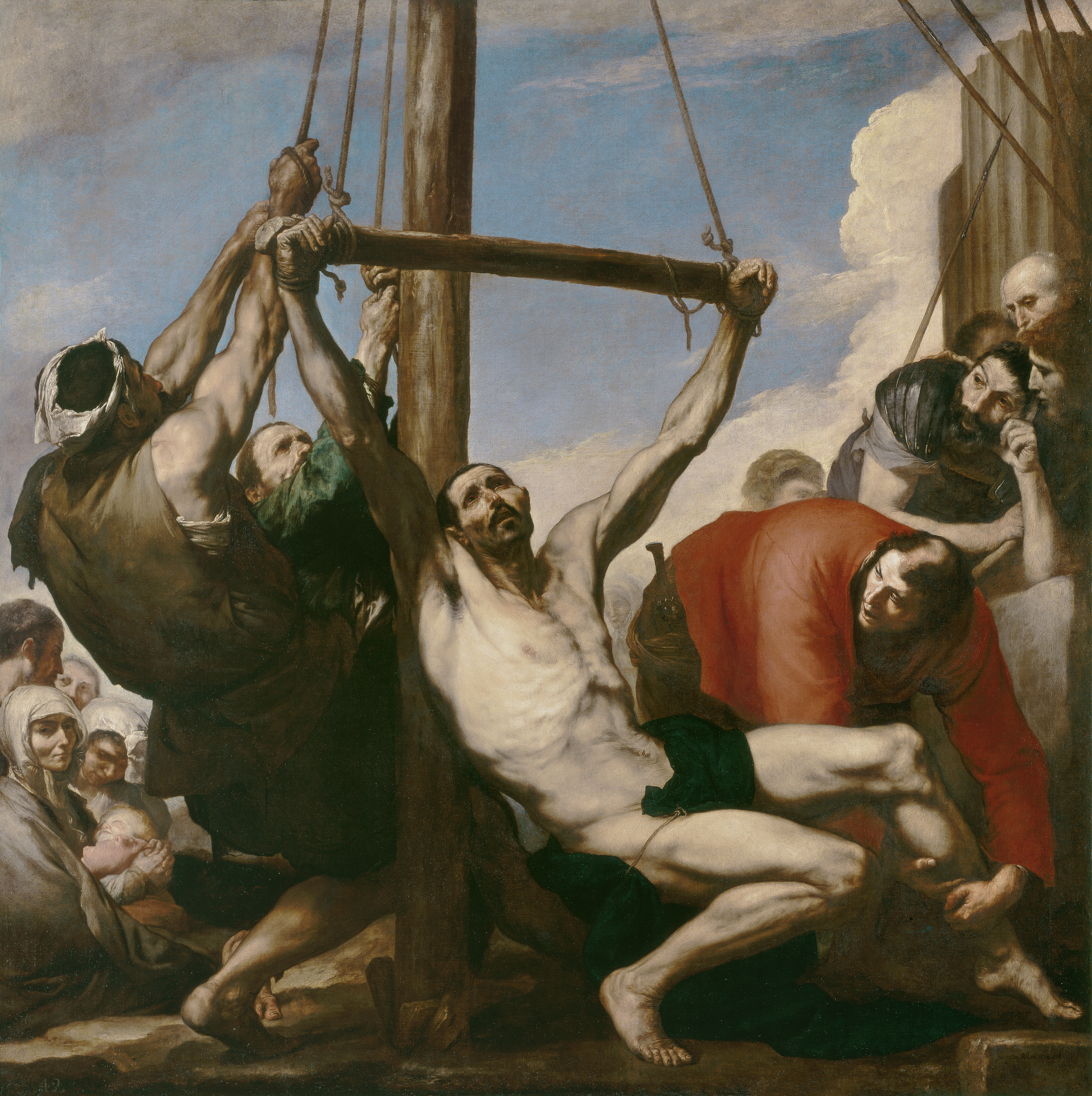
- Artist: Jusepe de Ribera
- Year: 1639
- Medium: oil on canvas
- Movement: baroque
- Subject: The Martyrdom of Philip the Apostle
- Dimensions: 234 cm × 234 cm (92 in × 92 in)
- Location: Museo del Prado, Madrid
- Accession: P01101

The Martyrdom of Saint Philip (Spanish: Martirio de San Felipe) is a painting by Jusepe de Ribera from 1639.

It is considered one of his best works. The Spanish critic Eugenio d'Ors said of it "almost, almost like a Russian ballet." The painting is exhibited in the Museo del Prado in Madrid.

== Description ==
For a long time it was thought that this painting represented the martyrdom of the apostle Bartholomew; an event that Ribera had painted several times. Only in 1953 was it established that the subject is Philip the Apostle by the art historian Delphine Fitz Derby. Following the resurrection of Jesus, Philip and his sister Mariamne together with Bartholomew preached in Greece, Phrygia, and Syria. He was martyred in Hierapolis when he was crucified.

Ribiera captures the moment when the preparations for the crucifixion are still in progress. He does so from a low perspective, giving the main characters monumentality and showing a large part of blue sky. Two executioners try to raise the apostle, while a third supports one of his legs. Bright sunlight illuminates his face that shows pain and resignation. The contrast of light and shadow enhances the dramatic effect.

On the right there is a group of curious onlookers who appear to comment on the event. On the left, on the other hand, the people who appear are oblivious to what happens; there is a woman holding a little child in her arms and looking toward the viewer, putting a tender and delicate counterpoint to the cruelty that dominates the rest of the scene. Some critics have wanted to see an allegory of Charity in this figure.

Judging by the treatment of color, the touches of brush and the splendid nude, this is a mature work by Ribera. It is less caravagesque than his previous works, showing the influence of Guido Reni and Domenichino.

== History ==
The Martyrdom of Saint Philip was likely commissioned by the II Duke of Medina de las Torres as a gift to King Philip IV of Spain; Philip the Apostle was his patron saint. For a long time, the painting was part of the royal collection. It survived the fire in the Royal Alcázar in 1734 and was subsequently installed in the Buen Retiro Palace and the Royal Palace of Madrid. Sometime after 1818 the painting was moved to the Prado.
