= Ottoman defter of the District of Branković (1455) =

Ottoman tax register of 1455

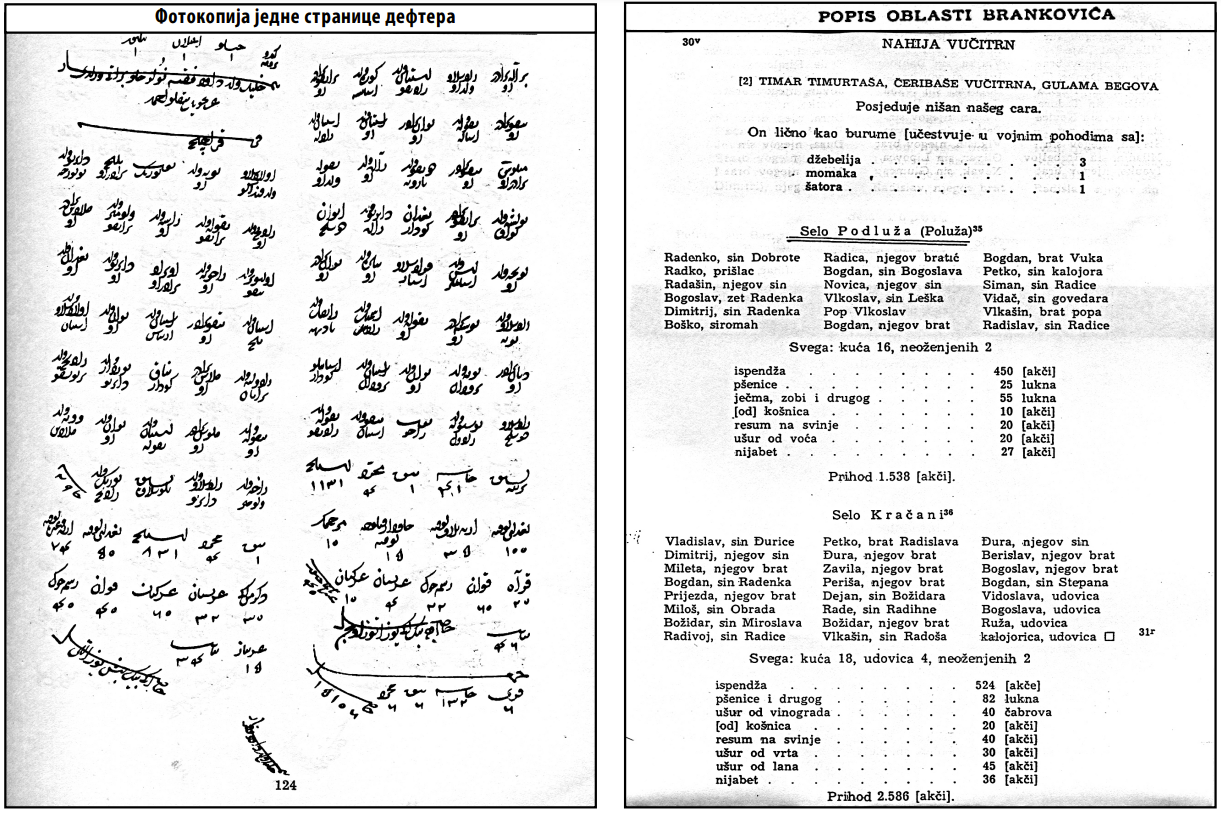
An original photocopied page of the defter from the Istanbul historical archives and its translation into Serbo-Croatian

The Ottoman cadastral tax census (defter) of 1455 in the District of Branković (defter Vuk-ili) is one of the oldest Ottoman tax registers in the Balkans. At the time of the defter, the District of Branković included parts of central Serbia (present-day Toplica District and the historical Raška Region), part of northeastern Montenegro and parts of eastern Kosovo (the Kosovo Plain). The defter recorded:

- 480 villages
- 13,693 adult males
- 12,985 dwellings
- 14,087 household heads (480 widows and 13,607 adult males)

In 1972, the Sarajevo Institute of Middle Eastern Studies translated the original Turkish census and published an analysis of it. Subsequently, others have covered the subject, such as Vukanović Tatomir, Srbi na Kosovu, Vranje, 1986.

- 13,000 Serb dwellings present in all 480 villages and towns
- 75 Vlach dwellings in 34 villages
- 46 Albanian dwellings in 23 villages
- 17 Bulgarian dwellings in 10 villages
- 5 Greek dwellings in Lauša, Vučitrn
- 1 Jewish dwelling in Vučitrn
- 1 Croat dwelling

Of the names mentioned in this census, conducted by the Ottomans in 1455 and covering a part of Eastern Kosovo, 96.3% were of Slavic origin, 1.90% of Roman origin, 1.56% of uncertain origin, 0.26% of Albanian origin, and 0.25% of Greek origin. Serbian scholars consider that the defter indicates an overwhelmingly Serbian local population. However, Madgearu argues that the series of defters from 1455 onward "shows that Kosovo... was a mosaic of Serbian and Albanian villages", while Prishtina and Prizren already had significant Albanian Muslim populations, and that the same defter of 1455 indicates the presence of Albanians in Tetovo. The accuracy and the consistency of the registration have been doubted, as shown in the example of Janjevo (a primarily Catholic Croat village in eastern Kosovo), which according to the reading of the register had only one Croat household.

As the defter only recorded timar holders and dependent farmers, groups which socially weren't part of either of these two classes were not included. That is most probably the reason why Vlachs (a social category which was not part of the Ottoman feudal hierarchy) were not recorded in the region which the defter covered.

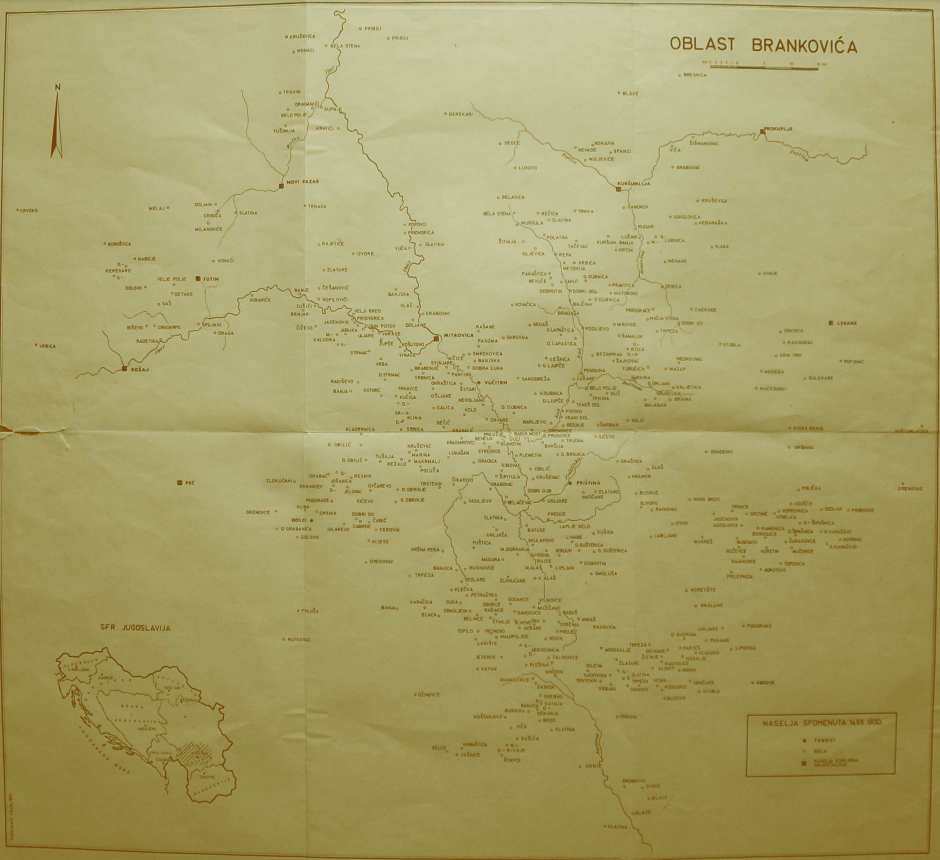
A map depicting The District of Branković drawn based on toponyms from the defter

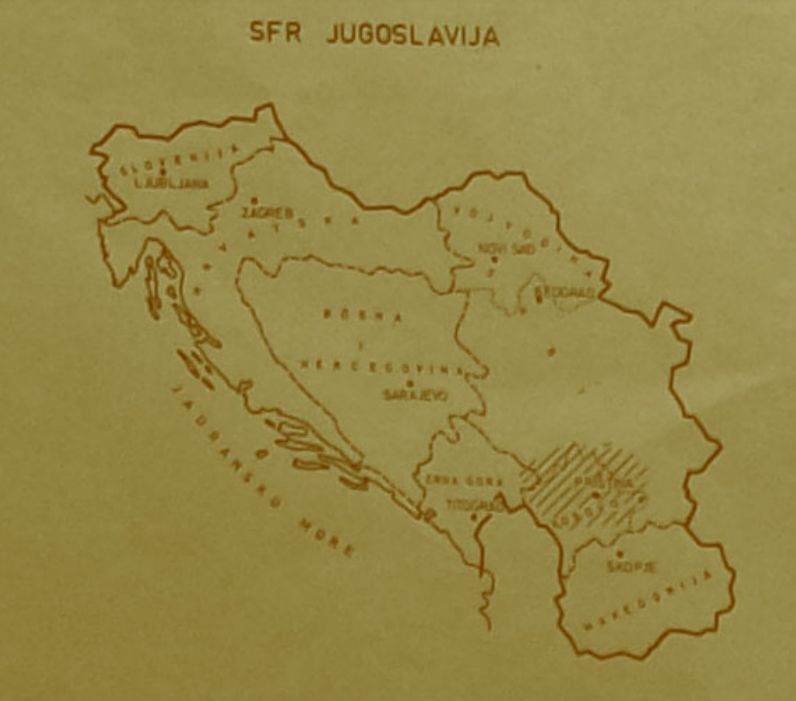
The territory of The District of Branković marked with diagonal lines within The Socialist Federal Republic of Yugoslavia (1946–1992)

== See also ==
- Demographic history of Serbia
- Demographic history of Kosovo

== Sources ==
- Bobić, Mirjana (2015). "The Reconstruction of Domestic Communities in the Branković Region of Serbia in 1455". In Sović, Silvia; Thane, Pat; Viazzo, Pierpaolo (eds.). The History of Families and Households: Comparative European Dimensions. BRILL. ISBN 9004307869.
- Orijentalni institut u Sarajevu (1972). "Oblast Brankovića – Opširni katastarski popis iz 1455. godine".
- "Turski katastarksi popisi iz 1455. godine za Oblast Vuka Brankovića" (PDF). Archived from the original (PDF) on 2014-11-08.
