= Jahi Jahiu =

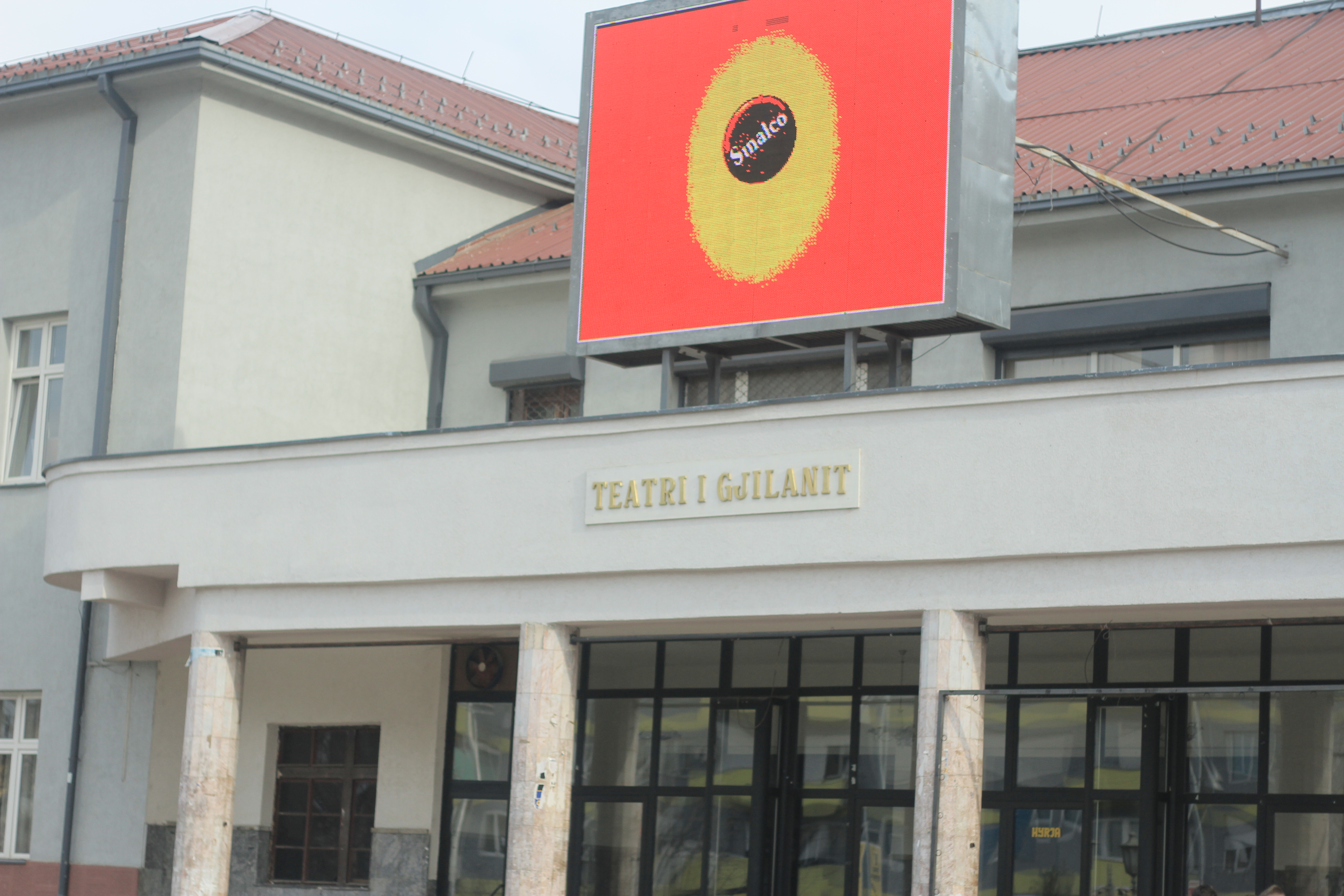
Theater in Gjilan

Jahi Jahiu (born 1959) is an Albanian playwright and dramaturgist.

== Early life ==
He was born in the village Sllubica of Gjilan in 1959.

== Education work ==
He was the primary and secondary head in the Faculty of Arts – Dramaturgy, University of Belgrade, Yugoslav Drama Theatre. Jahiu is one of the first five Albanian playwrights. He has carried out dozens of major projects and adapted works for the stage. He worked during the 80s on Radio Pristina television program RTP(Radio Television of Kosovo). He was a former director of the Professional Theatre of Gjilan in a five-year term.

== Playwright ==
He helped deliver original Albanian dramas, such as Rropollari and Holy Family.

He was the playwright, theater director and director of the drama Nebi Islam. He authored the play O also have I'a friend.

Jahiu won two awards at the Festival of Albanian Comedy with two performances by Theatre of Gjilan and home theater "laboratories". He won Best Director and Scenario Prize in January 2015.

== Works ==
- Albanian drama, Rropollari and Holy Family
- Jahi Jahiu Miroslav Kerleža appearance i dramatic texts Kerleža "In agony" and that of Ivo Brešani Hamlet in Livriçkën (the bottom),
- Staging of Holy Family
- Staging of Wetlands drama of Islami Nebi (Musa Ramadani) director Jahi Jahiu and I. Ymeri, Fair Gjilan, 1995.
- O also have I'a friend
