= Zoran Antić =

Serbian footballer

Personal information
- Full name: Zoran Antić
- Date of birth: 7 February 1975 (age 51)
- Place of birth: Gnjilane, SR Serbia, SFR Yugoslavia
- Height: 1.75 m (5 ft 9 in)
- Position: Left back

Senior career*
Years	Team	Apps	(Gls)
1994–1995	Borac Čačak	6	(0)
1995–1998	Milicionar		
1998–1999	Balkan Bukovica		
1999	Radnički Niš	18	(1)
2000–2007	Hajduk Kula	201	(4)
2007–2010	Borac Čačak	76	(1)
2011–2012	Metalac Gornji Milanovac	26	(0)
2012	Sloboda Čačak	26	(0)
- * Club domestic league appearances and goals

Zoran Antić (Serbian Cyrillic: Зоран Антић, born 7 February 1975) is a Serbian former professional footballer.

Born in Gnjilane, SAP Kosovo, SR Serbia, he previously played with FK Milicionar, FK Balkan Mirijevo, FK Radnički Niš, FK Hajduk Kula, FK Borac Čačak and FK Metalac Gornji Milanovac in the Serbian SuperLiga.

== Career statistics ==
Club	Season	League	
Club	Season	Apps	Goals
Hajduk Kula	1999–2000	20	1
Hajduk Kula	2000–01	26	0
Hajduk Kula	2001–02	26	2
Hajduk Kula	2002–03	32	0
Hajduk Kula	2003–04	24	1
Hajduk Kula	2004–05	24	0
Hajduk Kula	2005–06	26	0
Hajduk Kula	2006–07	23	0
Total		201	4
