= Eshref Qahili =

Kosovan visual artist

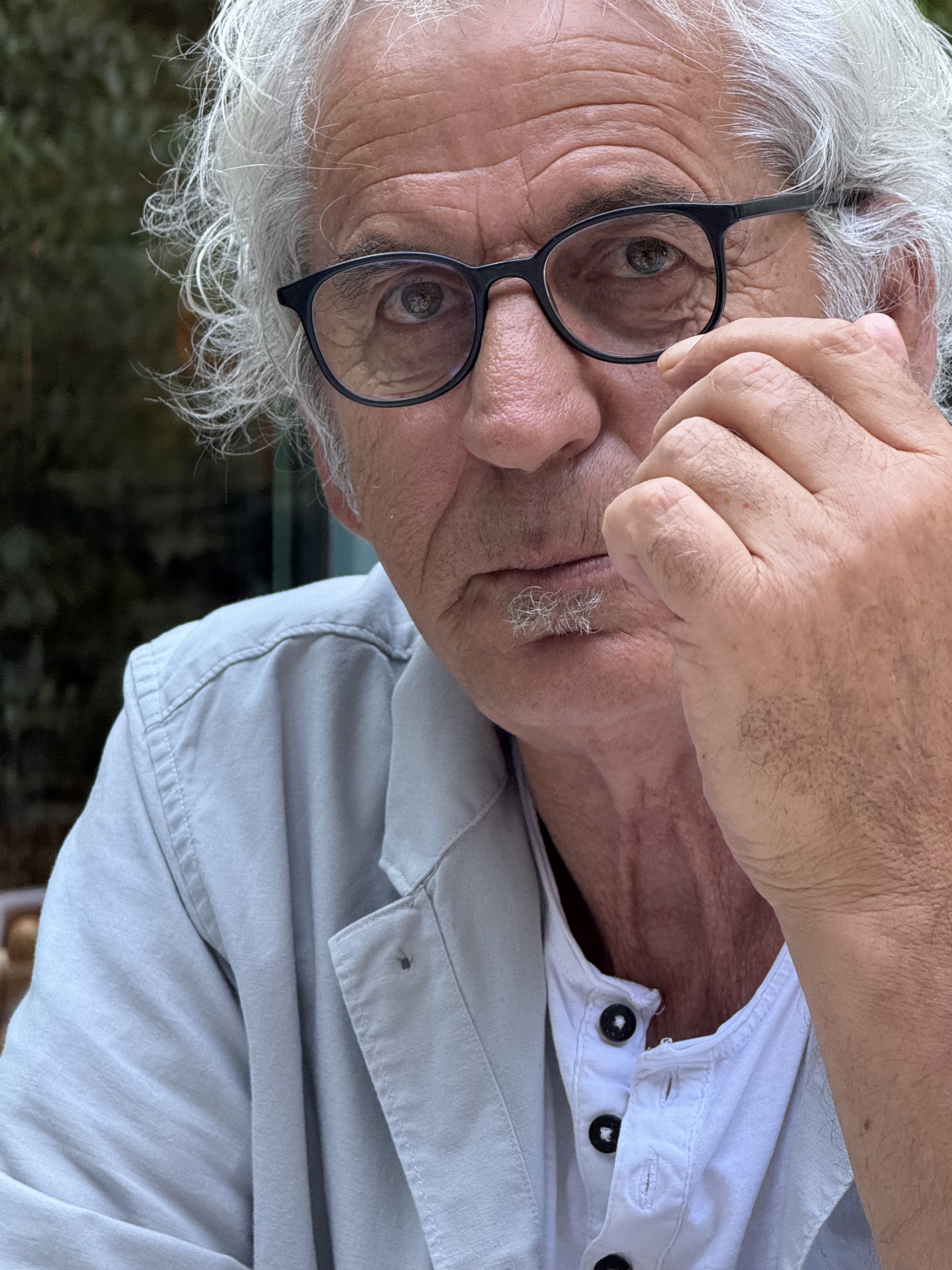
- Eshref Qahili
- Born: 1960 (age 65–66); Serbia
- Education: University of Prishtina, Faculty of Arts
- Movement: Contemporary Art

Eshref Qahili (born 1960) is a comteporary artist, Albanian Kosovan painter and former professor of drawing at the University of Pristina, Faculty of Arts. His work has been exhibited domestically and abroad, including in U.S. embsasies.)

== Early life and education ==
Qahili was born in Rahovicë in the Presheva Valley. He completed secondary art education in Peja in 1978. He graduated in painting from the Academy of Arts in Prishtina in 1983, where he studied under Rexhep Ferri. He completed postgraduate studies at the same institution in 1997.

== Career ==
Qahili works in painting, drawing, sculpture, photography, and mixed media. Since 1992, he has presented solo and group exhibitions in Kosovo and abroad, including in France, North Macedonia, Bulgaria, Montenegro, Albania, Cyprus, and the United States. He has exhibited at institutions including the National Gallery of Kosovo, the National Museum of Albania, and the National Gallery of North Macedonia.

He has worked as a professor of drawing at the University of Prishtina.

== Exhibitions ==
Selected solo exhibitions include:

- 2025 – Vija, vazhdimi i pikës (The Line, Continuation of the Point), FAB Gallery, Tirana, Albania
- 2022 – Children's Museum Retrospective, Academy of Sciences and Arts of Kosovo
- 2020 – Memories of Kosovo, Orléans, France
- 2018 – University of Massachusetts Gallery, Boston, United States
- 2014 – Galerie Espace 26 Denfert Rochereau, Paris, France
- 2014 – Eastern Mediterranean University, Famagusta, Cyprus
- 2007 – Museum of Contemporary Art, Skopje, North Macedonia
- 2002 – National Gallery of Kosovo, Prishtina, Kosovo
- 2002 – National Museum, Tirana, Albania
- 1992 – ARS Gallery, Prishtina, Kosovo

== Institutional context and publications ==
He has presented solo exhibitions at institutions including the National Gallery of North Macedonia in Skopje, the National Museum of Albania in Tirana, Pavillion of Durrës International Contemporary Art Biennale and venues in Paris and Boston.

His work is included in Small Is Beautiful: Contemporary Art from Kosovo.

== Published books and catalogues ==
- Qahili, Nita. Children’s Museum: Eshref Qahili. Prishtina: Galeria Qahili, 2022. ISBN 9789951907903.
- Qahili, Nita (ed.). The Line, Continuation of the Point. Prishtina: Hyllix, 2026. ISBN 9789951920346.
- Mulliqi, Luan (ed.). Kosova Feniks. Tirana: Onufri, 2005. ISBN 9789992753460.
- Sarajevske sveske, nos. 45–46. Sarajevo: Mediacentar, 2015. ISSN 1512-8539.
- Small Is Beautiful: Contemporary Art from Kosovo. Luciano Benetton Collection (Imago Mundi).
- Contemporary Art of Kosovo. National Gallery of Kosovo, 2000.
- International Contemporary Artists, vol. 8. 2014.

== Other projects ==
In 2013, Qahili founded Galeria Qahili in Prishtina. The gallery was established on 6 May 2013 as a private contemporary art space. Since its establishment, it has organized exhibitions, artist talks, workshops, and artist residencies.
