= Kaljaja =

Kaljaja (Cyrillic: Каљаја) or Kalaja (Albanian) may refer to:

- Kaljaja (Balovac) is an archaeological site located southeast of the village of Balovac, in municipality of Podujevo
- Kaljaja (Teneš Do) is an archaeological site, which is located in Teneš Do, in municipality of Pristina
- Kaljaja (Binačka) is a fortress located near village Podgrađe, near Gjilan
- Kaljaja (Bistrička) is the medieval fortress in Prizren
- Kalaja (Ulcinj)
