= Ramadani =

Ramadani is an Albanian surname. Notable people with the surname include:

- Agim Ramadani (1963–1999), Albanian writer
- Arben Ramadani (1981–2000), Kosovar Albanian militant
- Behar Ramadani (born 1990), Albanian football player
- Emran Ramadani (born 1992), Macedonian footballer
- Hetem Ramadani, Kosovo-Albanian engineer and businessman
- Musa Ramadani (1944–2020), Kosovan novelist and poet
- Nijazi Ramadani (born 1964), Kosovan poet, novelist and literary critic
- Ramadan Ramadani (1944–2005), Kosovan painter
- Reshat Ramadani (born 2003), Macedonian footballer
- Rizky Ridho Ramadani (born 2001), Indonesian footballer
- Soibahadine Ibrahim Ramadani (born 1949), French politician
- Taip Ramadani (born 1972), Australian handball coach and former player
- Tsabitha Alfiah Ramadani (born 2000), Indonesian weightlifter
- Ylber Ramadani (born 1996), Albanian footballer
- Zana Ramadani (born 1984), German activist, politician and writer
- Zedi Ramadani (born 1985), Croatian footballer
- Zekirija Ramadani (born 1978), Macedonian football coach
