= Podgrađe =

Podgrađe (Serbian Cyrillic: Подграђе; Latin: suburbium) is a Serbo-Croatian place name, a toponym derived from pod ("below") and grad ("town"), when in the Middle Ages "grad" was a term used for a fort, fortress, castle. It was part of wider urban area of a fortress or a castle, and/or a settlement adjacent to it, and can be referred to or translated as a castle town or a market town (in some cases developed from or as inner bailey or outer bailey), as in nomenclature used for urban development in the medieval Europe.

It may also refer to name of a number of places, mostly in the Balkans, usually reminiscence of an earlier settlement adjacent to a historic fort/castle:

== Bosnia and Herzegovina ==
- Podgrađe, Foča, a village
- Podgrađe, Gornji Vakuf, a village
- Podgrađe, Nevesinje, a village

== Croatia ==
- Podgrađe, Vukovar-Srijem County, a village near Nijemci
- Podgrađe, Krapina-Zagorje County, a village near Marija Bistrica
- Podgrađe, Split-Dalmatia County, a village near Omiš
- Podgrađe, Zadar County, a village near Benkovac

== Kosovo ==
- Podgrađe, Gnjilane, a village near Gnjilane
- Podgrađe (Binačko), a fortress near the river Binačka Morava
- Podgrađe (Klinsko), a fortress near the river Klina

== See also ==
- Podgradje, settlement near Ljutomer, Slovenia
- Pograđe, a village near Klina, Serbia / Kosovo
- Pogragja (disambiguation)
