= Ushtima e maleve =

Ushtima e Maleve (English: Sound Of The Mountains) is a Kosovar daily magazine published in Albanian in Kosovo's capital Pristina.

The magazine was conceived by a group of high school students from Gjilan on the occasion of the 100th anniversary of the League of Prizren, an Albanian national movement.

== History ==
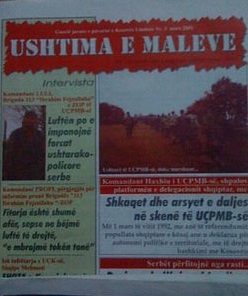
Ushtima e maleve, albanien magazine

After consultations, the group decided to form a magazine honoring the League of Prizren and the nation's major events. Its first leaflet was published on June 4, 1980 and the second edition was published on January 15, 1981. Its first editorial staff consisted of Nexhat Rrustemi, Nijazi Ramadani, Naim Kurteshi and Nevzad Isufi.

As continuations of the League of Prizren organization was banned, the magazine was soon disbanded by the communist authorities and many of its members were imprisoned for a period of time for irredentist and hostile activities.

It resumed printing issues in Kokaj, Pristina, Kosovo from 1998-2001 during the height of Kosovo Liberation Army's activities and developments in Southeastern Kosovo and Insurgency in the Preševo Valley. Special editions included "Kosovo and self-determination" and "The Last Galgotha". The third edition, from January-April 2001, covered the insurgency and developments in Western Macedonia. Its editorial staff consisted of staff editor Fatmir Arifi, Nijazi Ramadani and Arbresh Dalipi.
