= Pogragja =

Pogragja (Albanian: Pogragjë) or Pograxha (Albanian: Pograxhë) may refer to:

- Pogragja, Gjilan, a village near Gjilan, Kosovo
- Pogragja, Klina, a village near Klina, Kosovo

== See also ==
- Podgrađe (disambiguation)
