= Economy of Gjilan =

The municipality of Gjilan is in the Anamorava microregion of Kosovo, and has 42 villages. Due to the overall increase in economic development, Gjilan has become a known administrative, commercial and industrial region. The territory of Gjilan's municipality currently has an area of 391 km with approximately 130,000 residents. The entire territory owns about 24,230 hectares of farmland, from which 18,224 hectares are considered to be agricultural land capable of producing a variety of traditional crops. Gjilan is well positioned geographically as an administrative unit. Automobile highways roads permit good communication and movement of goods and people, connecting it with Pristina, Vitia, Ferizaj, Kamenica, Bujanovac, and other centers of Kosovo. Thus, Gjilan has an important strategic center capable of having an impact in the region. Natural resources in the region have been exploited since the Middle Ages. Notable resources include potassium, magnesium, and the thermal mineral water, or hot springs.

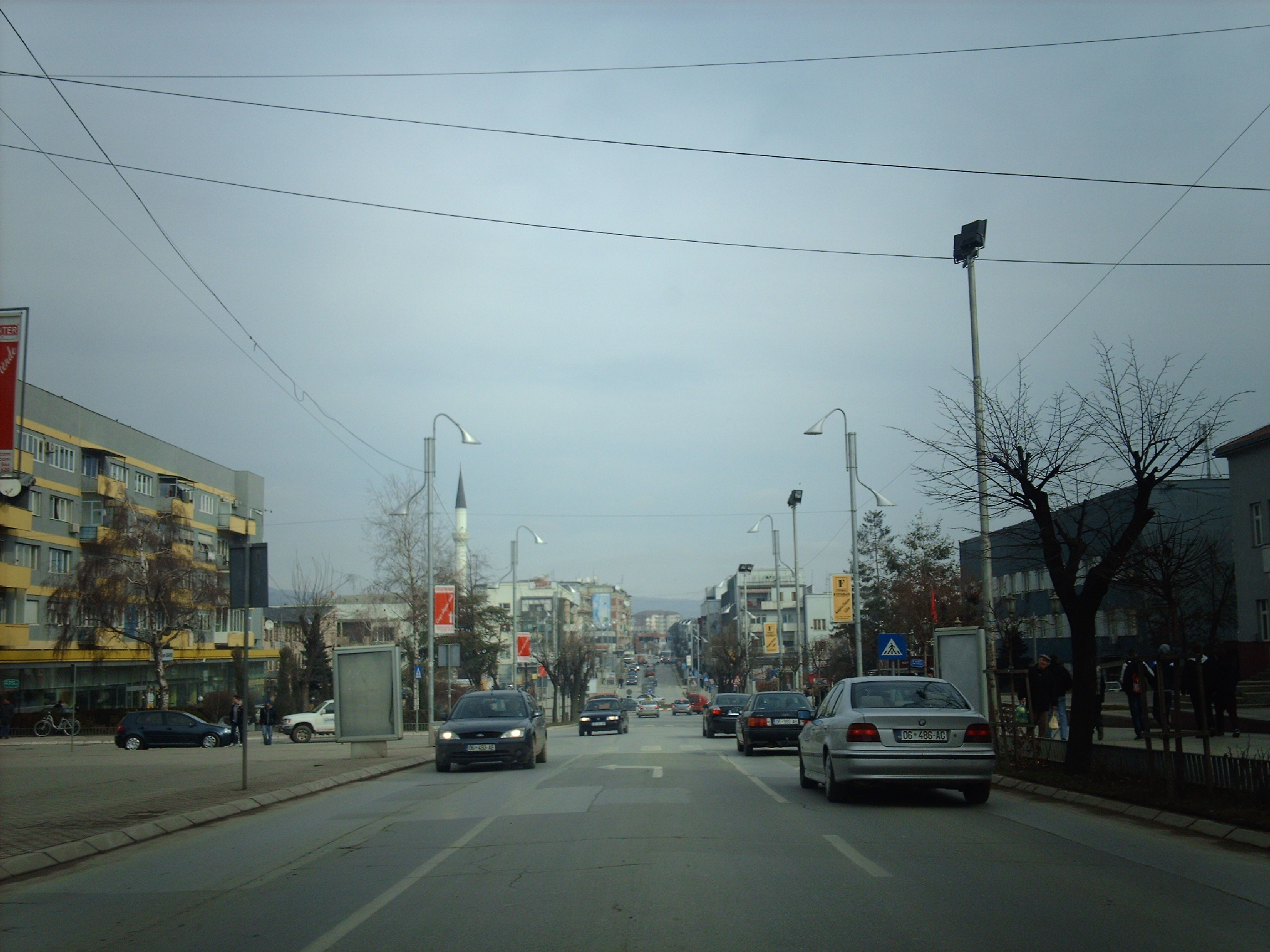
GJILANII

== Historical development of Gjilan ==
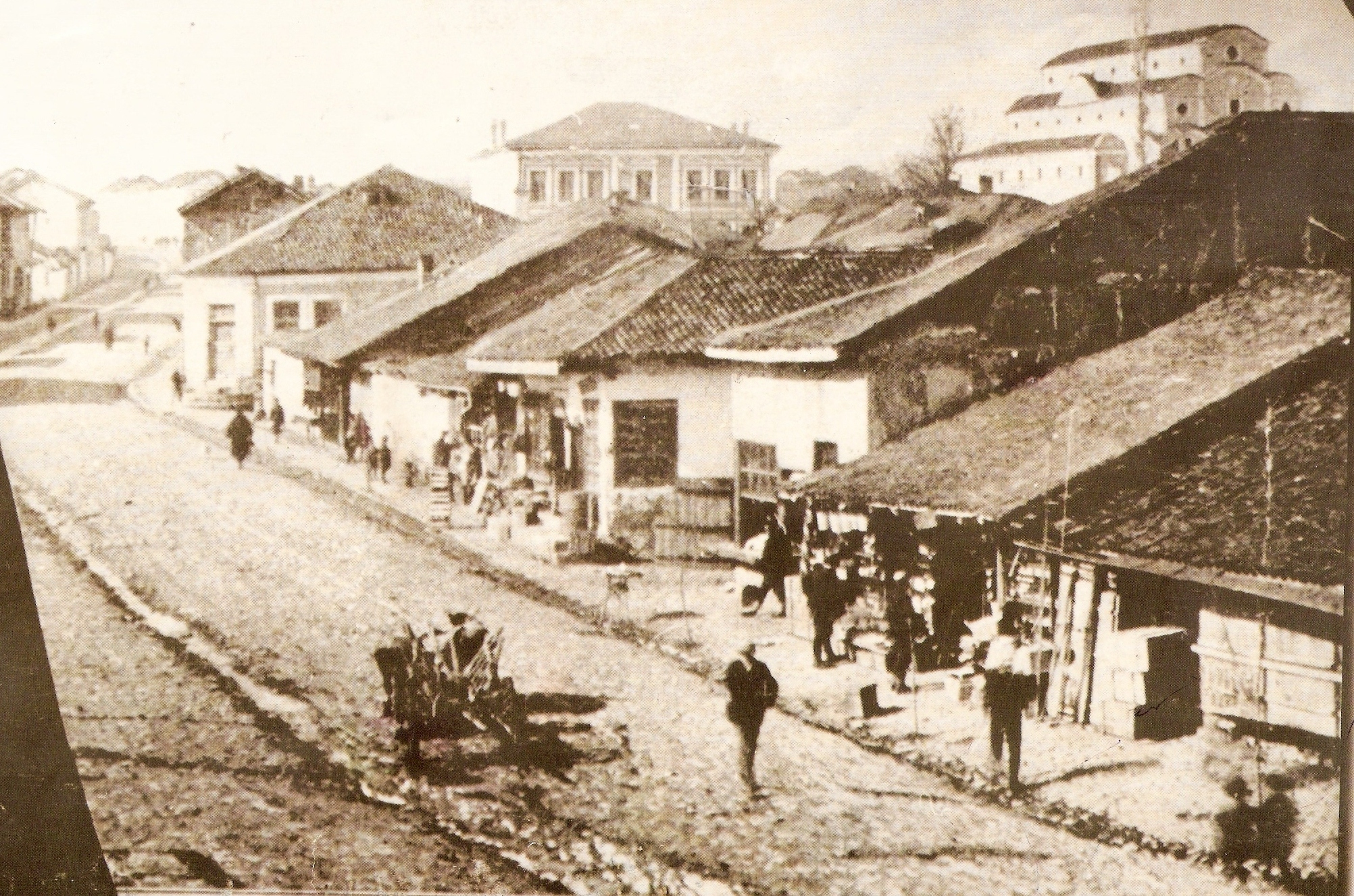
Gjilani 1925

Historically, Gjilan’s economy was based mostly on agriculture. Land was worked with simple and primitive tools, producing low agriculture yield. Most production was for domestic consumption, not export. Regional agricultural output traditionally included poultry, livestock, handicrafts, arboriculture, and vegetable production.

== Industry ==
After World War II, industrial development was initiated in the municipality. This was achieved in particular by raising tobacco combine. Favorable climatic conditions, soil solvency, commitment and massification of farmers led to the development of this industrial branch. Over the course of 80 years, combine tobacco produced about 1,156 tons of fermented tobacco and 1,400 tons of cigarettes. Alongside the development of the tobacco industry was also the textile industry, which Gjilan was recognized and affirmed in the domestic and external market. It can be said that this branch helped Gjilan to be identified as the industrial city. During the 1970s, industrial production was concentrated in the tobacco industry, textile, flour, in agro-industry, in the steelworks, in the construction material industry, and radiators. After 1980, there was investment in a range of other branches of economic activity, which helped develop other objects of industrial capacity.

== Construction ==
Gjilan has a long tradition in construction. In 1980, it employed over 2,000 people in the industry. This upward momentum in economic activity in the housing construction sector also extended throughout Kosovo and other municipalities. A solid road network provides good connections to Gjilan surrounding villages as well as other parts of Kosovo and the region. The construction of a ring road reduced traffic within the city. Project Mobility II foresaw the urban traffic organization of Gjilan.

== Trade ==
Trade, as a branch of economics has a long tradition in Gjilan. Trade in the region increased after World War II. As a result of rapid development, the first commercial enterprises were formed, extending over a network of shops in most localities in Anamorava and abroad. Within this sector is a well-established mall that was important for the supply of goods to citizens. In the Gjilan region, private sector development increased in the 1980s and 1990s. During this period, Gjilan businessmen began to invest in various industries. Several companies set up, such as Fluidi, Dea, Ola, and RC cola. Other private sector manufacturing enterprises include, in the wood industry: Kosovo Mobileria, Diellza, Fanton; in textile: Dita Gsh, Tekom, Menakon; in metal: Al Besimi, Abyl Metal, Lesna Dekon, Përparimi, Dritakos, Kosovaplas, Euro plast; in construction material: Bejta Company, Alkos Company, Lindi, Globi, Blerimi, and Tafa.

== Development of banking system ==
Banking system in the municipality of Gjilan is based on free market economy and private capital. Owners of private banks are mainly from abroad and they own about 96% stake, while 4% of the shares belong to the local capital. A few commercial banks began operating from the beginning: Kasabanka New Bank Of Kosovo, NLB, BpB Private Business Bank, Commerce Bank, Pro Credit Bank (formerly MEB), Raiffeisen Bank, National Commercial Bank, TEB Bank, followed by microfinance institutions and insurance companies. In addition to commercial banks and microfinance institutions in Gjilan, there are 8 functioning insurance companies which conduct financial activities and services, among which are the following companies: Dukagjini, Dardania, Kosova e re, Siguria, Sigal, UNIQA GRUP AUSTRIA, Insig dhe and Sigma. Insurance companies began operating in Gjilan since 2002. These companies have received their licenses from the BPK (Banking and Payment Authority of Kosovo) and operate under the rules in force. These insurance companies have their own products, which have defined and exercised their activities and operations.

== Craftsmanship ==
Craft activity is usually exercised mainly in the urban centers. In the region of Anamorava, craftsmanship developed in main cities. In present-day Gjilan, the main urban center of the area, craftsmanship no longer has the role it had in past centuries, though it has transitioned into similar activities. Little is documented on the history of craftsmanship development in Gjilan. However, according to the scarce data, in 1914 there were three recorded jewelry stores. In Gjilan even today there are many shops of jewelry. Today, there are 33 stores of gold and jewelry in Gjilan.

== Agriculture ==
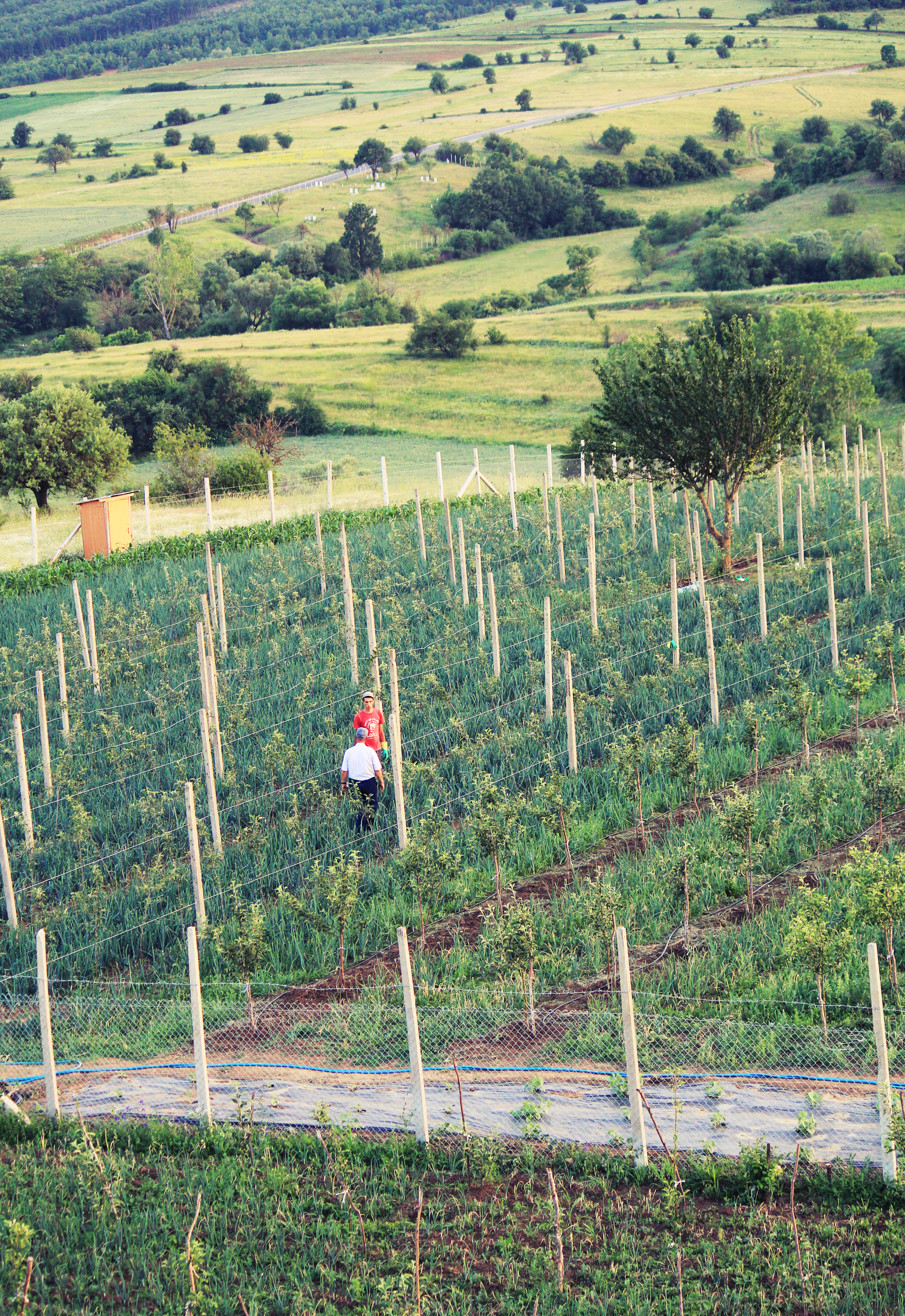
Bresalc Gjilan 5

For a long time, agriculture was severely underdeveloped in Gjilan. The land was worked manually using primitive tools. Usage seeds for planting were traditional, qualitative and not productive, while extensive livestock breeds dominated, with low productivity. Between 1940 and 2010 momentum was gained in social sector development.

Combines were organized in cooperatives and agricultural stations such as Station for the Advancement of Agriculture, Agricultural Combine, Agricultural Cooperatives, Tobacco Plant, City Butchery for small animals and thick, birds Incubator for opening capacity of 9 million birds a year, freezer for fruit trees, veterinarian service stations, and others. All these agrarian subjects had employed around 4,000 permanent workers and about 10,000 seasonal workers. The entire agricultural production was well organized and had an export even in western countries.

After the war, farmers began work in very difficult conditions, without tools and without proper machinery. In the meantime, the government was not properly consolidated. Central and local institutions did not have the budget nor the experience needed to face the challenges of the time, on one hand, while many foreign organizations who had come to offer help in the consolidation of Kosovo agriculture acted without any clear concept and did not yield the expected results, resulting in stagnation. With the start of the privatization process, the majority of the mentioned agrarian undertakings changed their destination. Only two of them, the plantation in Kravarica and poultry farm in the village of Livoc revived their previous production. Konsoni abattoir opened for broilers with an annual capacity of 600,000 thousand kg of meat. This farm has 60 full-time employees and a certain number of seasonal worker with a bright development prospect. Two companies, MOEA and Ask Food, have raised capacity of orchards in area of about 200 hectares and have built processing capacities. Ask Food has signed contracts for the export of its products to Germany, Albania and other countries. These two companies have approximately 150 regular employees and 200 seasonal workers.

== Livestock ==
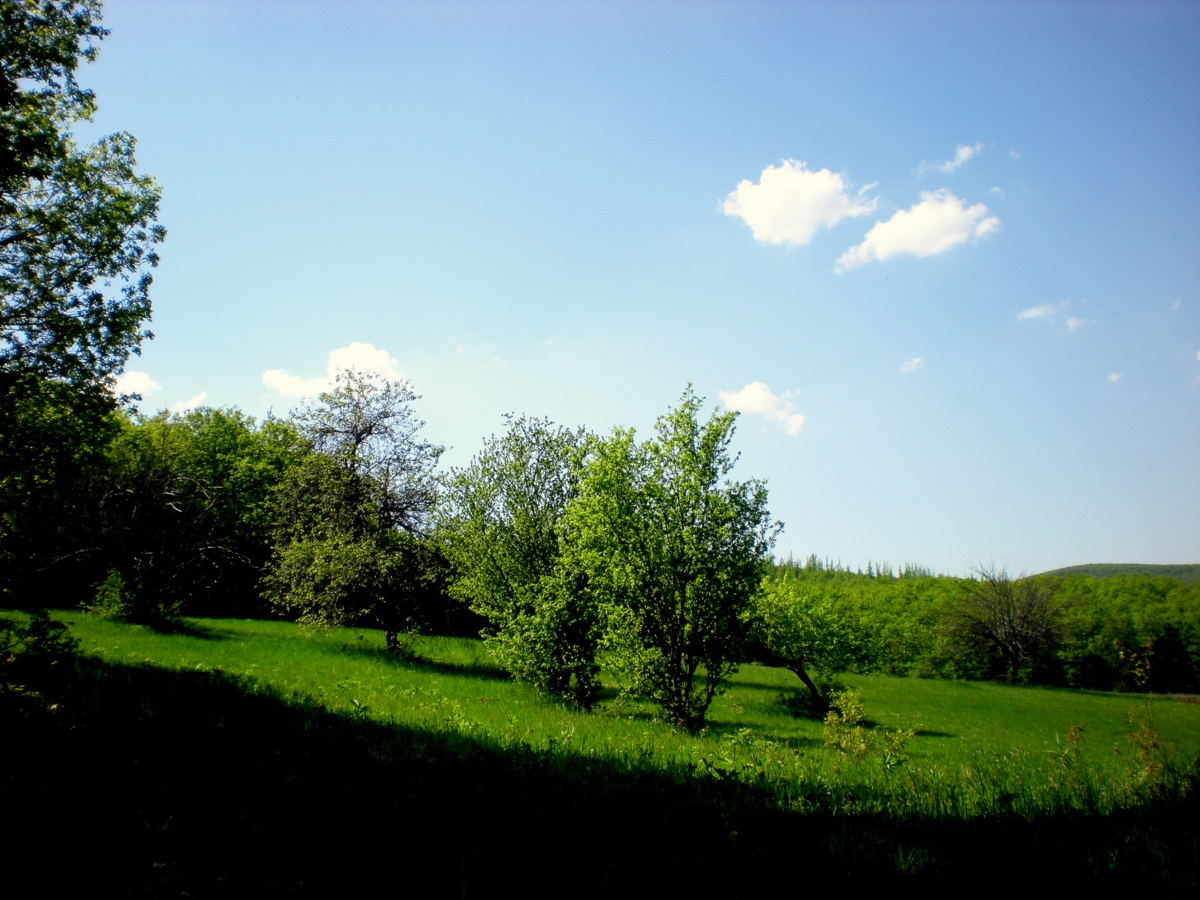
Stanishor

The livestock sector includes: 14,000 head of cattle, 9,000 sheep, 4,000 goats, over 200,000 laying hens, broilers 150,000, 3,500 bees colonies, 4,500 pigs and 1,000 horses. Besides poultry farms, which had a purebred breeding, other types of animals did not give high yields in the production of meat, milk, wool and other products. Prior to 1995, the municipality operated meat processing capacities, milk, wool, and incubators stations for birds, which enabled a good agribusiness for farmers of this area. War took a heavy tool on the livestock sectors, where the entire livestock and machinery manufacturing units were completely destroyed. After the war, some farmers recovered their farms, slowly increasing the number of heads of cows, calves, sheep, and goats. The privatization process has also caused damage by converting agricultural land to commercial and residential properties.

Regarding plant productivity, high trees are about 300 ha, 10 ha of soft fruit, 100 ha of commercial greenhouses, cereals white surface with 3500 ha, 2500 ha area with corn, while other crop areas have about 3500 ha. Livestock consists of 150 orchards and 100 greenhouses. Dairy farms processing varies. There are three licensed slaughterhouses. Licensed slaughterhouses. Farm infrastructure is generally poor as farms did not respond well to technological standards, especially those of cows, calves and sheep and goats. There is a lack of agricultural machinery for land preparation, a great part of them still do not use new techniques of food production capacity manufacturing capabilities. Local population is small. Food production output is near the average of Kosovo in terms of fulfillment. 70-80% of food is imported.

== Natural resources ==
The municipality of Gjilan has good nature resources as 3,000 ha meadows, pastures 4,000 ha, about 23.000Ha mountains and clean water. Agricultural land also has some 10,500 ha of fodder for animals.

== Branches ==
Gjilan's geographical location is advantageous for economic development. Among its downsides is that it lacks industrial area.

To achieve its objectives and goals for a more rapid development of the economy, various branches operate within sectors to identify advantages and weaknesses in order to work with possible options and identify opportunities. Sectors include Agriculture, Advanced craftsmanship, Industry, Mining and quarrying, underground resources (food industry, textile, wood, plastics, leather, paper, metal, chemical), Construction, Trade, Tourism, Financial Services (banks), insurance companies, Infrastructure and energy.
