= Walled town of Vidoški =

Fortified town and protected heritage, Bosnia and Herzegovina

Old town of Stolac
- Vidoški
- Stolac, Bosnia and Herzegovina
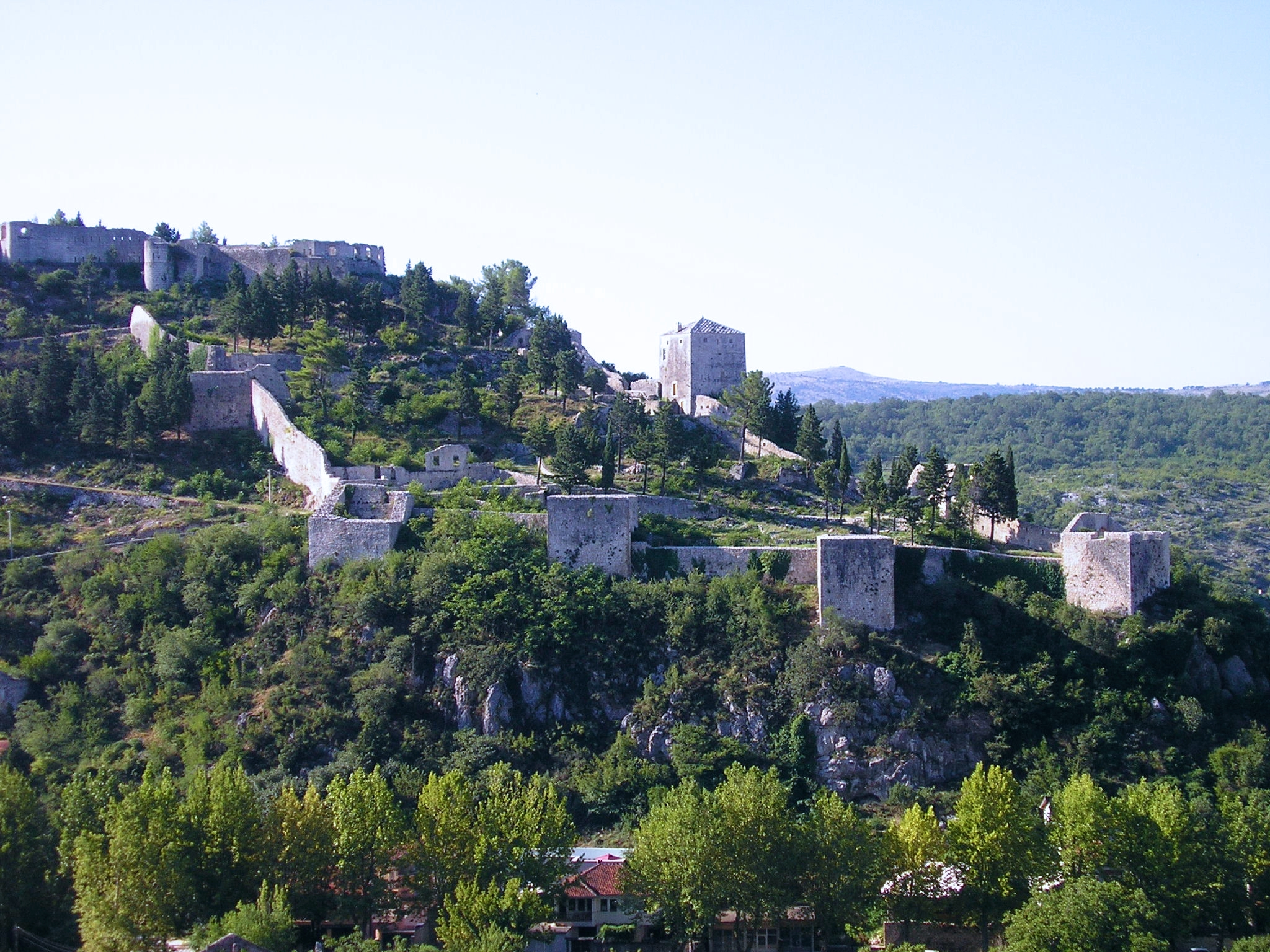
- Medieval and early modern period city of Stolac a.k.a. Vidoški

Site information
- Type: fortress
- Controlled by: Medieval Bosnian state, Ottomans, Austria-Hungary
- Condition: preserved

Location
- Coordinates: 43°04′50″N 17°57′21″E

Site history
- Built: fortress first mentioned 19 February 1444 (podgrađe Stolac even earlier 1420)
- Materials: limestone
- Events: 13 June 1456 captured by the Ottomans

Garrison information
- Past commanders: Vlatko Hercegović
- Garrison: since early 18th ce, 1706 the captaincy of Stolac was founded
- Designations

KONS of Bosnia and Herzegovina
- Official name: Stolac Old town, the historic site
- Type: Category II monument
- Criteria: A, B, D i.ii.iv.v., E i.ii.iii.iv.v., F i.ii.iii., G i.iii.v., H i., I i.
- Designated: 21 January 2003 (?th session)
- Part of: Stolac, natural and architectural ensemble
- Reference no.: 1314
- Decision no.: 06-6-32/03-4

Base plane of the Ljubuški Fortress

Vidoški, or Vidoski, also Old town of Stolac (Serbo-Croatian: Stari grad Stolac), is the medieval fortified city (walled town) of Stolac, Bosnia and Herzegovina. The ancient city is located above the modern city.
