= Kokaj =

Kokaj Kokaj-(Inatoc)
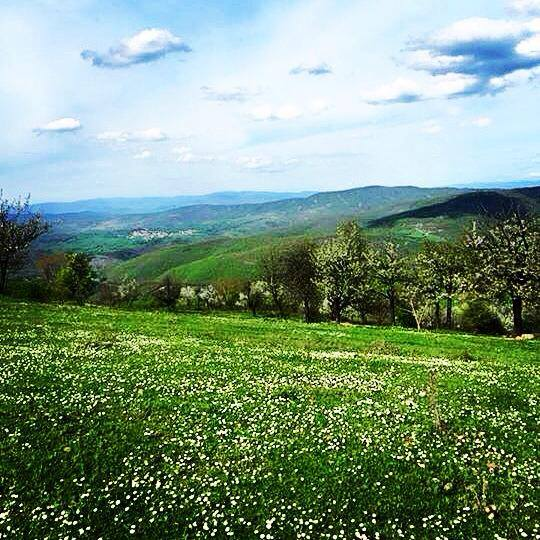

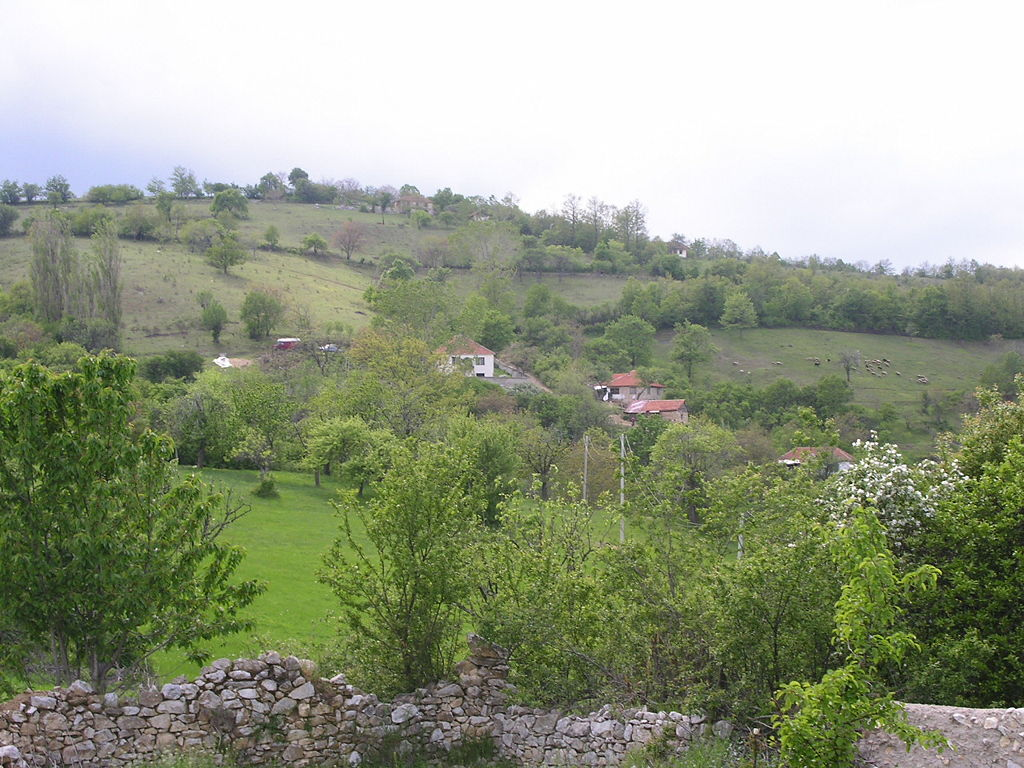

- Location in Kosovo
- Coordinates: 42°23′26″N 21°34′48″E
- Location: Kosovo
- District: Gjilan
- Municipality: Gjilan

Population (2024)
  - Total: 13
- Time zone: UTC+1 (CET)
  - Summer (DST): UTC+2 (CEST)

Kokaj (Albanian: Kokaj [kɔˈkaj]) (Serbian Cyrillic: Кокицe-Инатовце/Kokaj-Inatoc) is a village in the Gjilan district of Kosovo.

== Climate ==
The average temperature is -2 °C. Spring and autumn are cool and rainy, and the summer is hot and dry - with the average temperature + 22 °C. The high temperatures in Kosovo during the year are between 25 °C and + 38 °C. The average annual temperature is 10.6 degrees Celsius Anamorava. The annual rainfall are large, averaging 550 mm. In Lugina e Anamoraves Binçes are smaller than in higher areas in the slopes of the Karadag Mountains.

== Demography ==
1948: 250
1953: 289
1961: 342
1971: 386
1981: 376
1991: 100
2007: 30

== Notable residents ==
- Daut Dauti, Kosovan journalist
- Nijazi Ramadani, (born February 14, 1964, in Kokaj, Kosovo, then Yugoslavia) is a Kosovar Albanian poet, novelist and literary critic.
- Arben Ramadani (13 June 1981 – 19 May 2000) was one of the commanders of the Albanian militant group Liberation Army of Preševo, Medveđa and Bujanovac (UÇPMB).

== Gallery ==
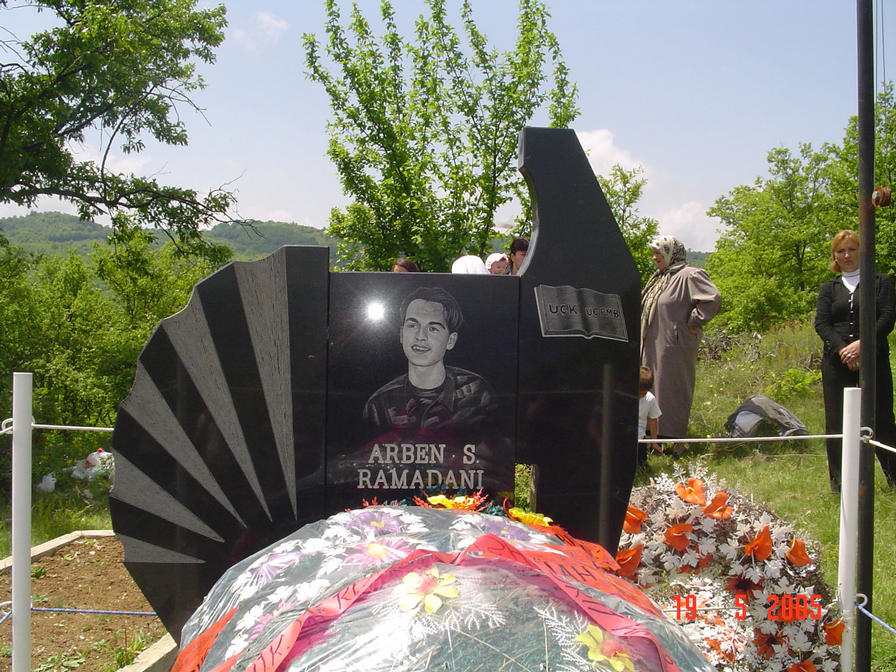
Burial place of UÇPMB commander Arben Ramadani

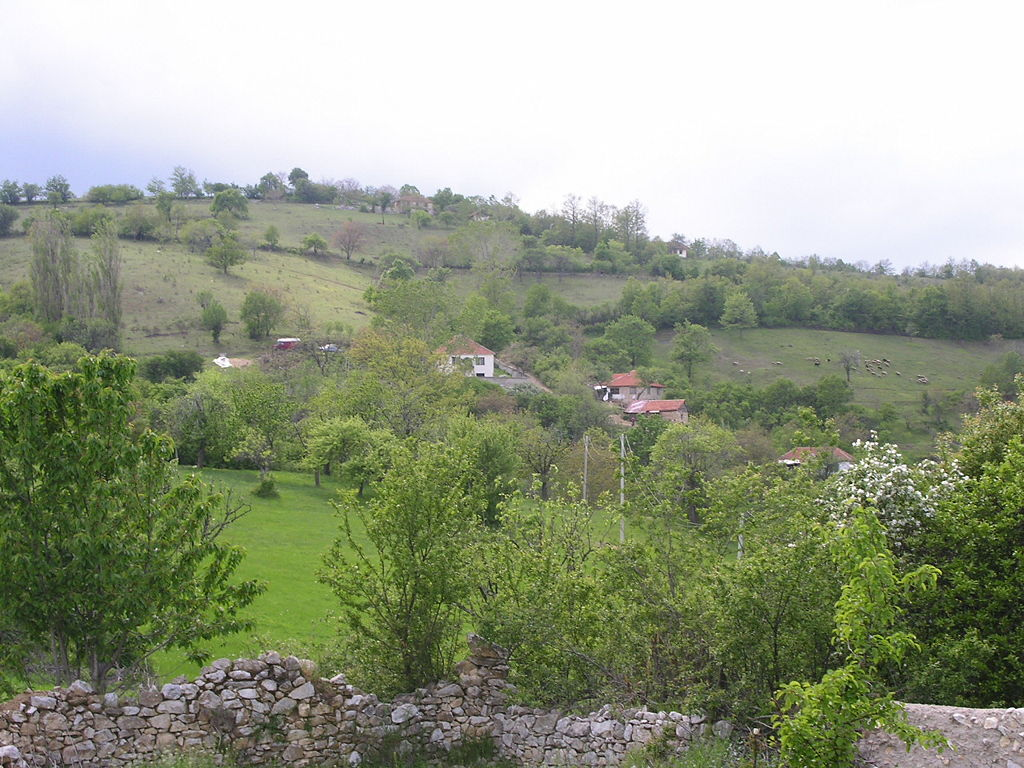
Meadow in spring

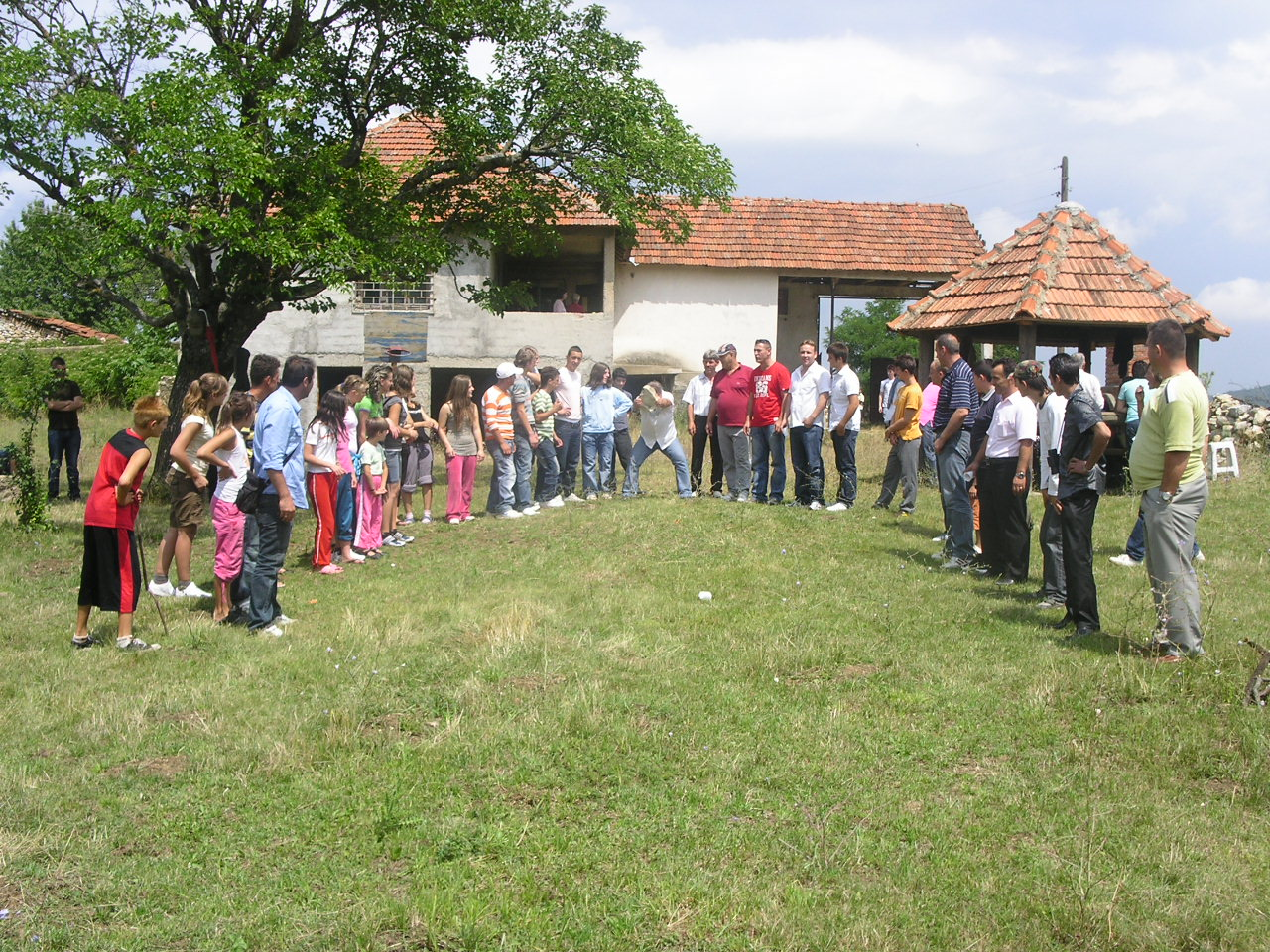
People of Kokaj

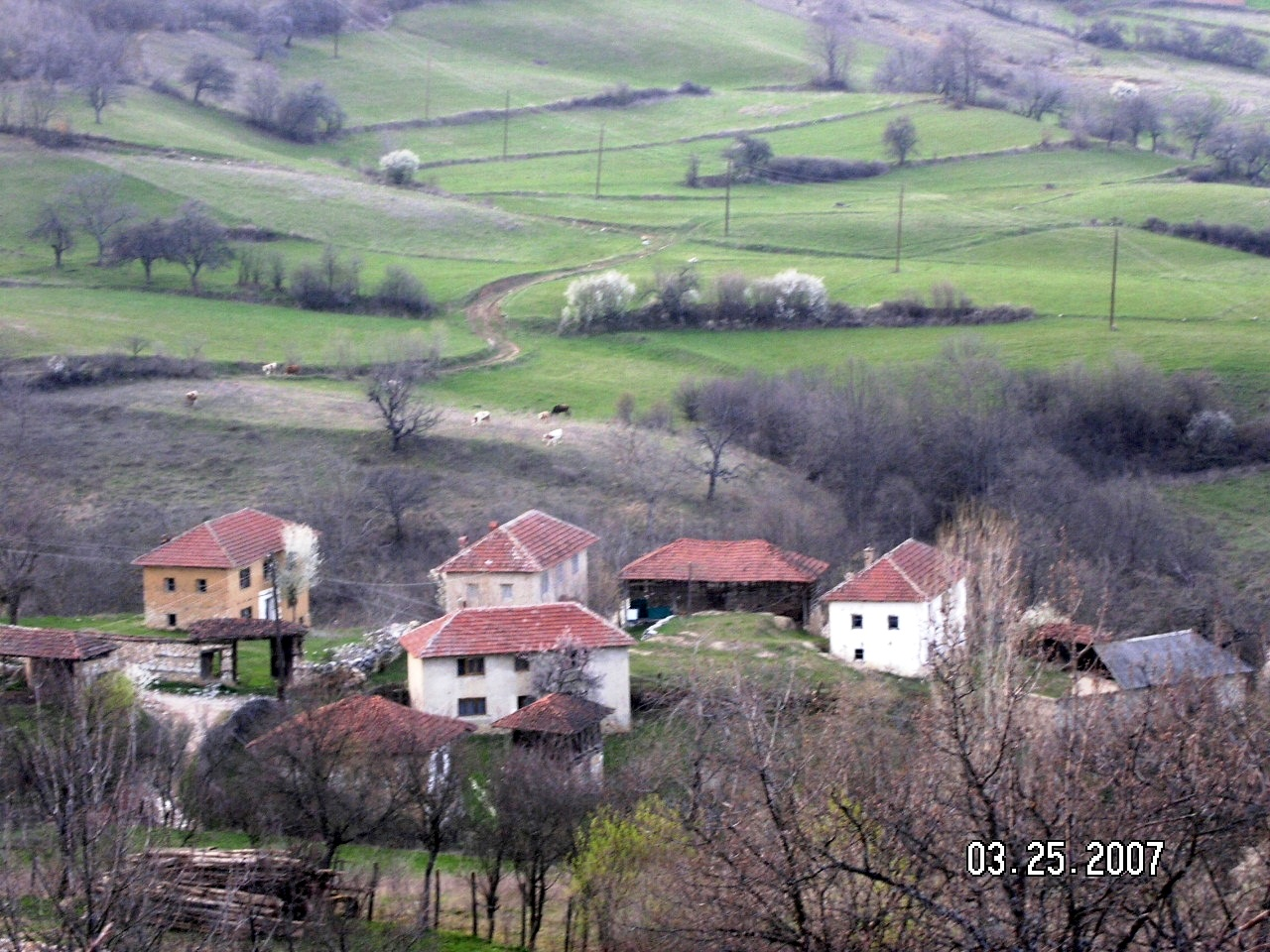
Neighborhood in Kokaj

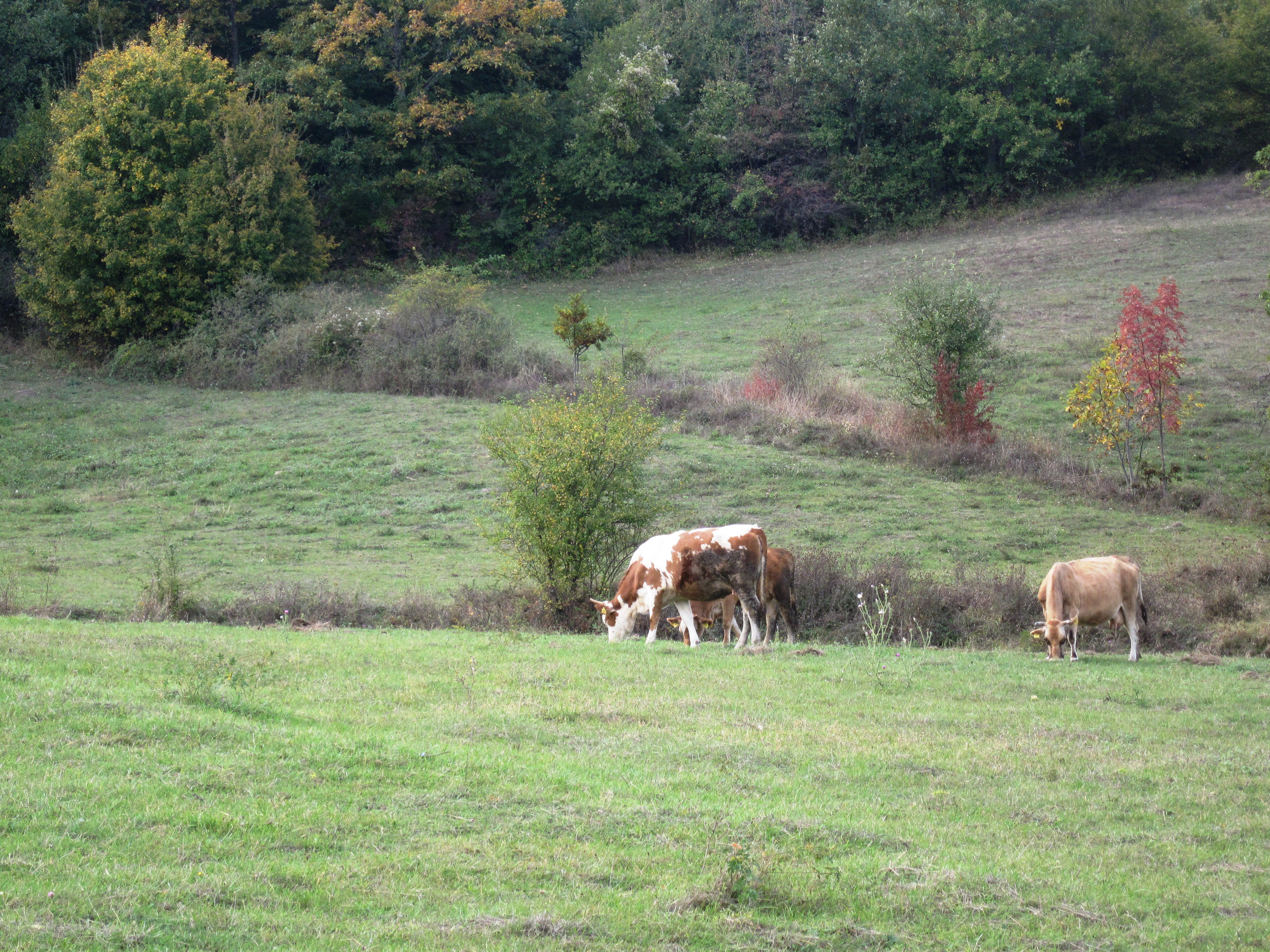
Grazing cattle

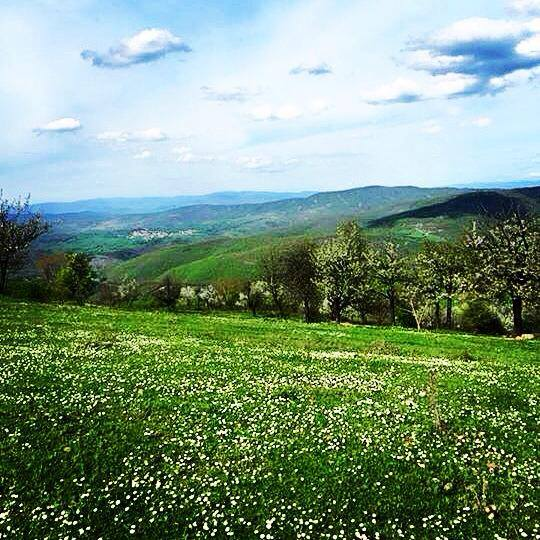
Meadow in spring

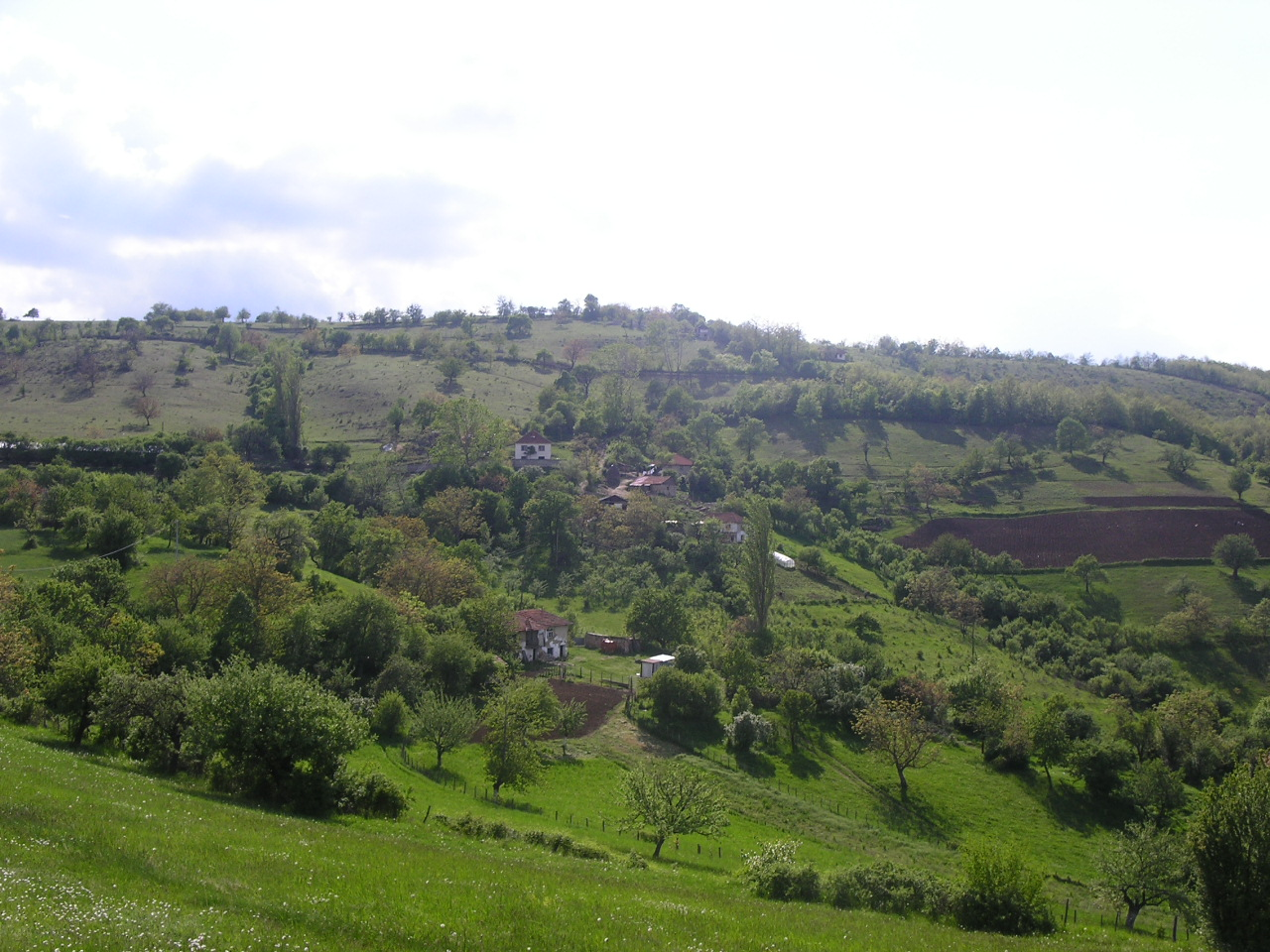
Grazing cattle

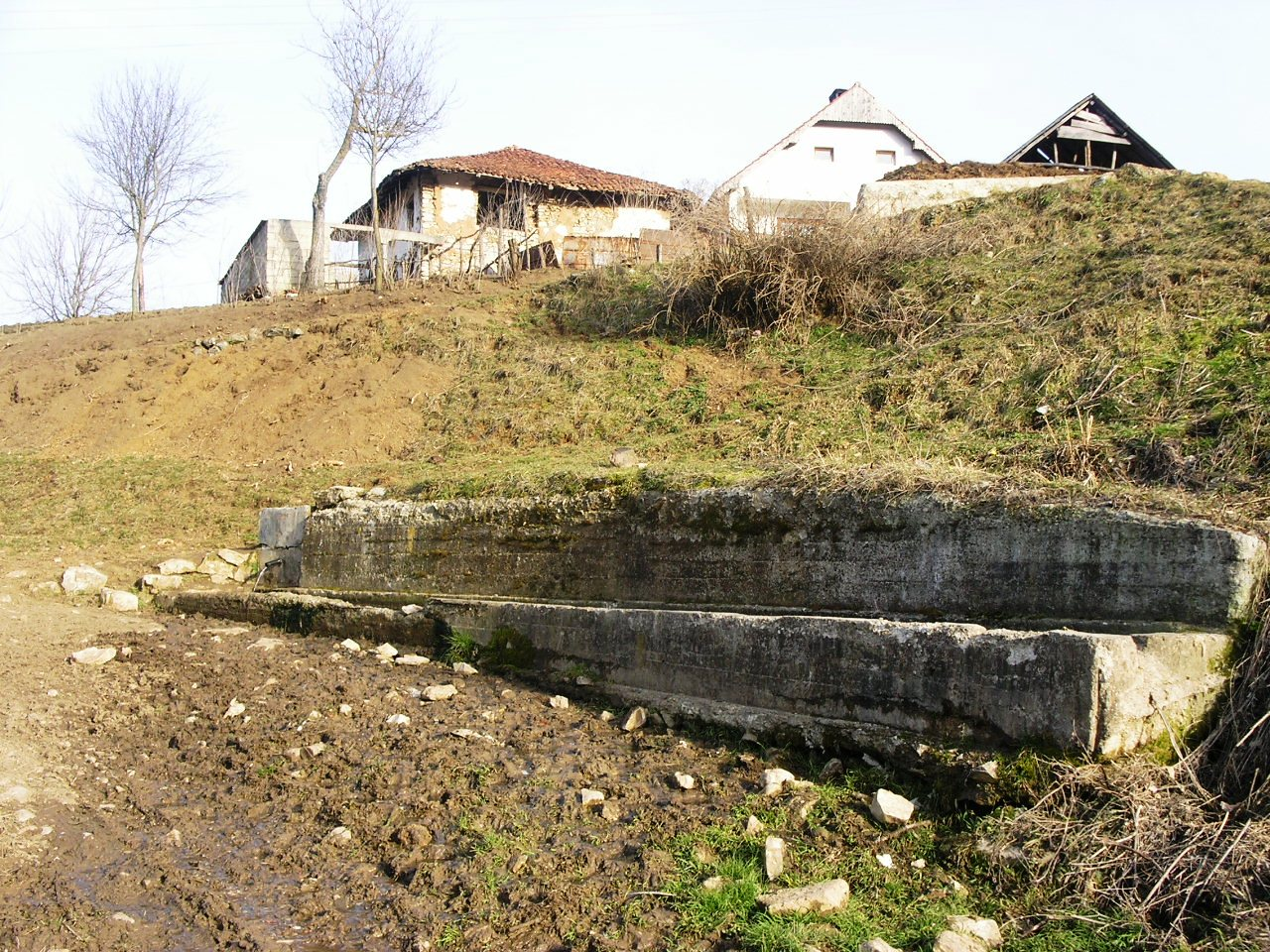
Fountain Village in Kokaj

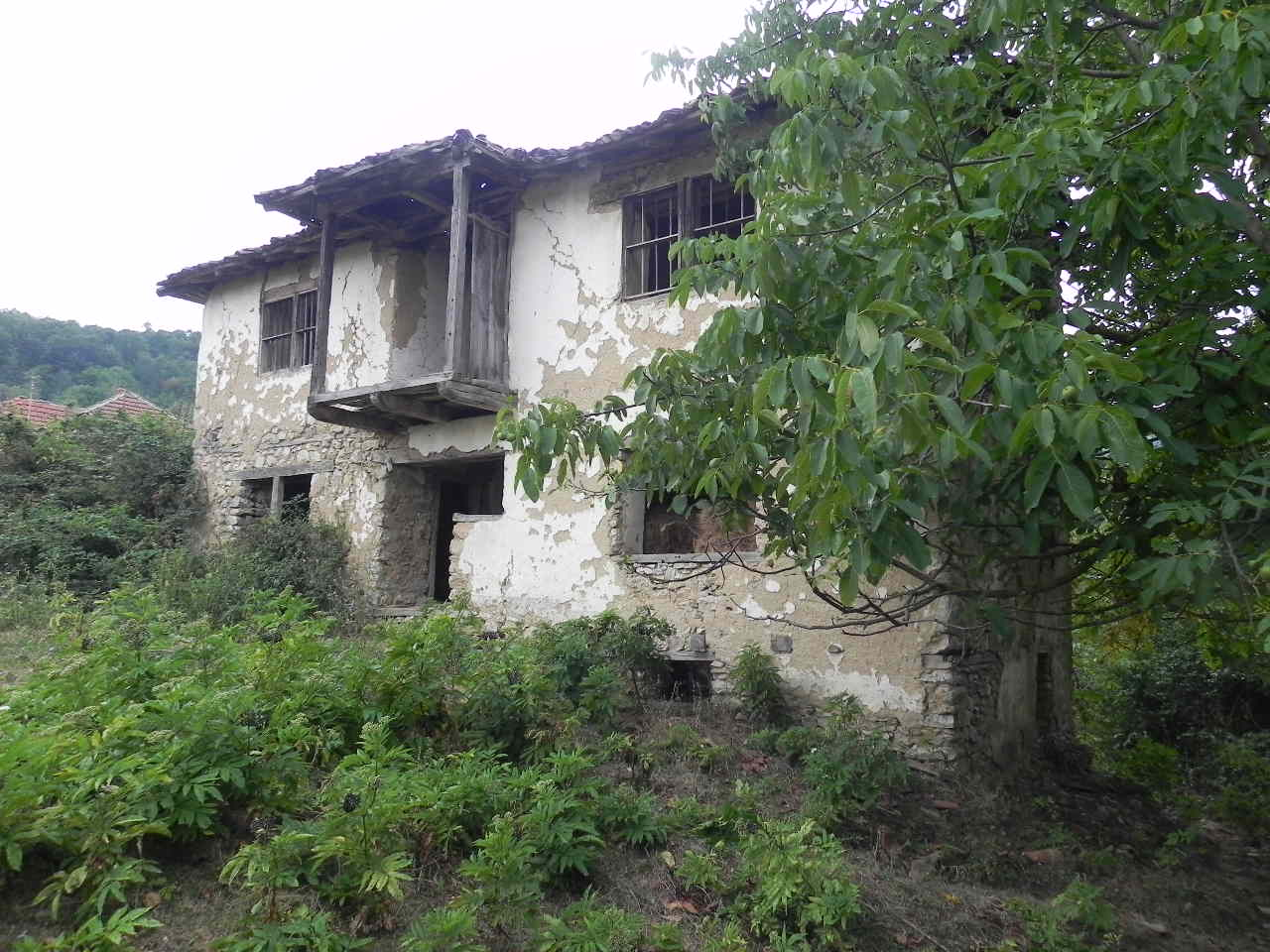
The house of Ilmi Rrustemi - Kokaj

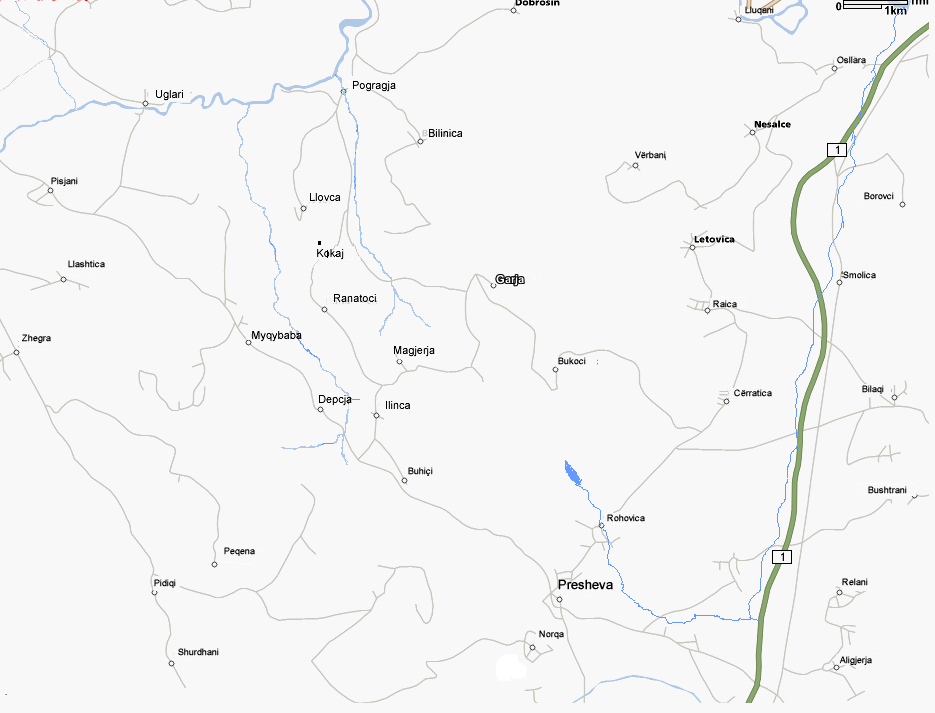
Views of the geographical alignment

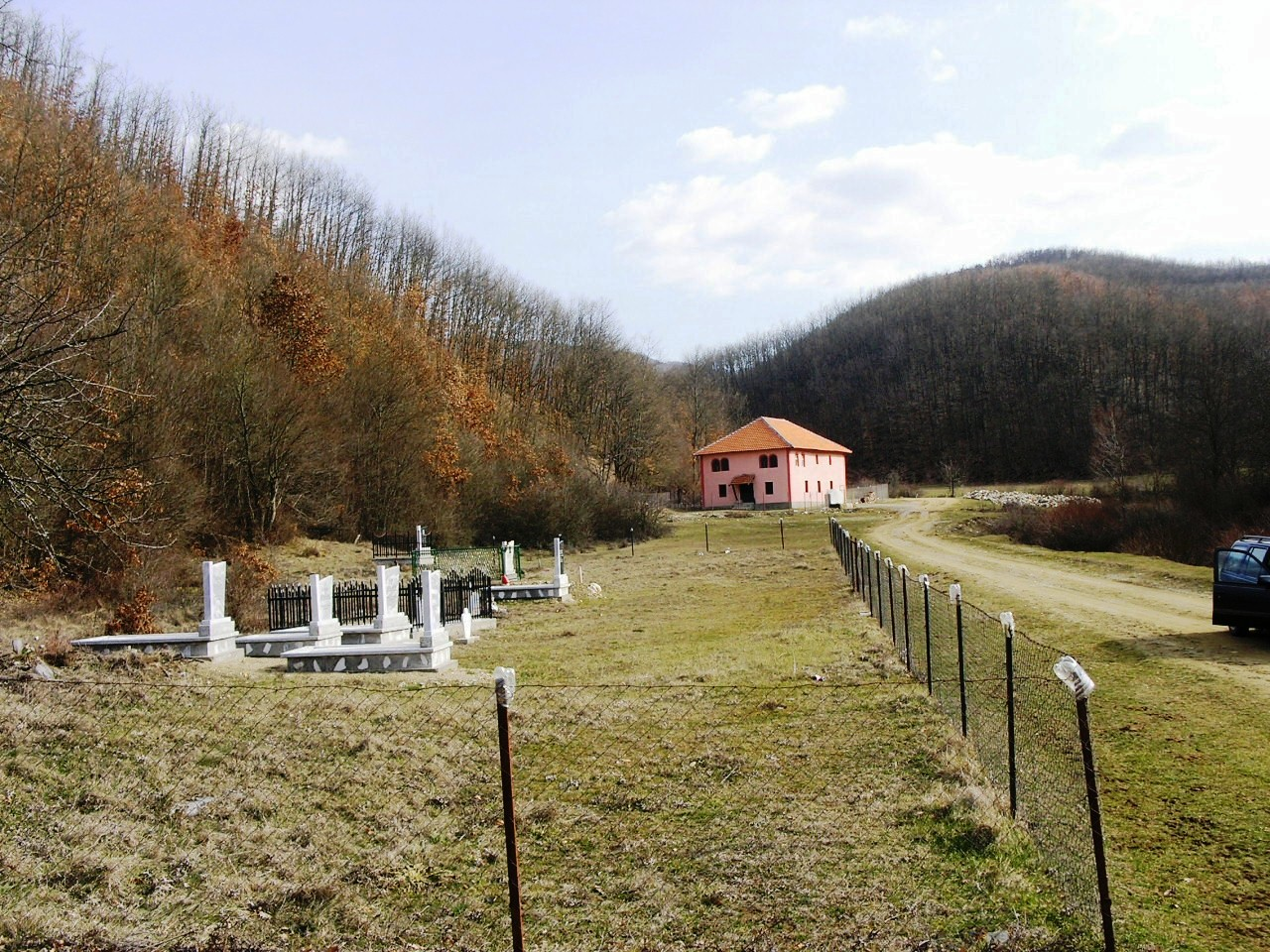
Village mosque

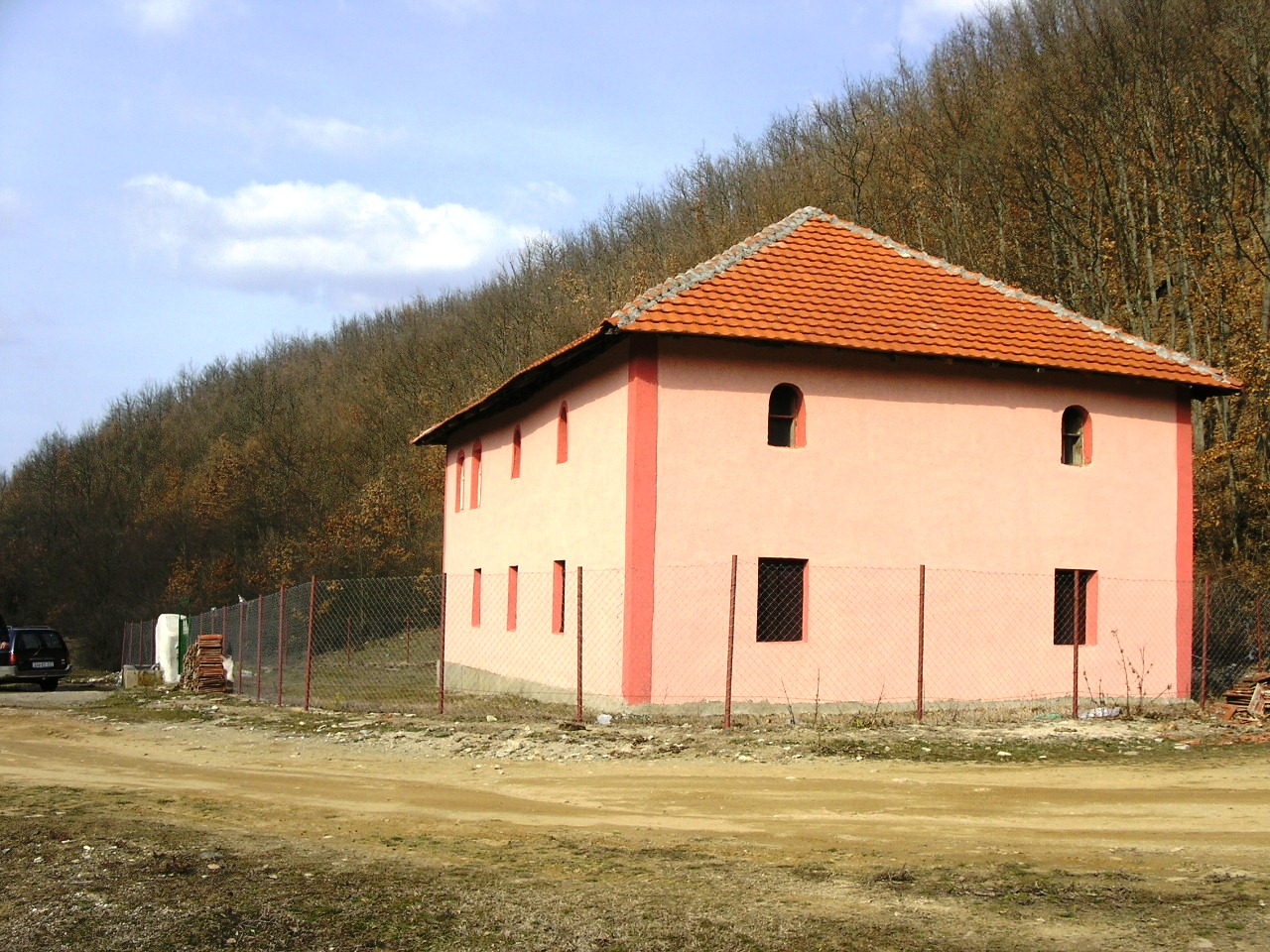
Village mosque
