= Pogragjë, Gjilan =

Pogragjë: Pogragja or Pogragjë (Albanian) Подграђе / Podgrađe (Serbian)
- Village
- Interactive map of Pogragjë
- Coordinates: 42°25′45″N 21°34′58″E
- Country: Kosovo
- District: Gjilan
- Municipality: Gjilan

Population (2024)
  - Total: 806
- Time zone: UTC+1 (CET)

Pogragja (Albanian: Pogragjë) or Podgrađe (Serbian Cyrillic: Подграђе), is a village in the municipality of Gjilan in Kosovo. It is situated on the right bank of the Morava e Binçës River, at the southeast end of Kosovo Pomoravlje.

The village is inhabited by Albanians and is home to the Pogragja Castle which was built in the 6th century during the Justinian era.

== Location ==
Pogragja lies along the Morava e Binçës river valley, at an altitude of 400 m. This settlement was affirmed in terms of institutional services with the administrative division until 1953 when it had the function of a municipal center. Pogragja today is a local community of this area. Pogragja is bordered by Lloca in the south, Bilinica and the village of Kukajin the east, Uglar in the west, Capari and Bukovik in the north, and Dobercani Ranilug and Stublina in the northeast.

== Sights ==
- Pogragja Castle
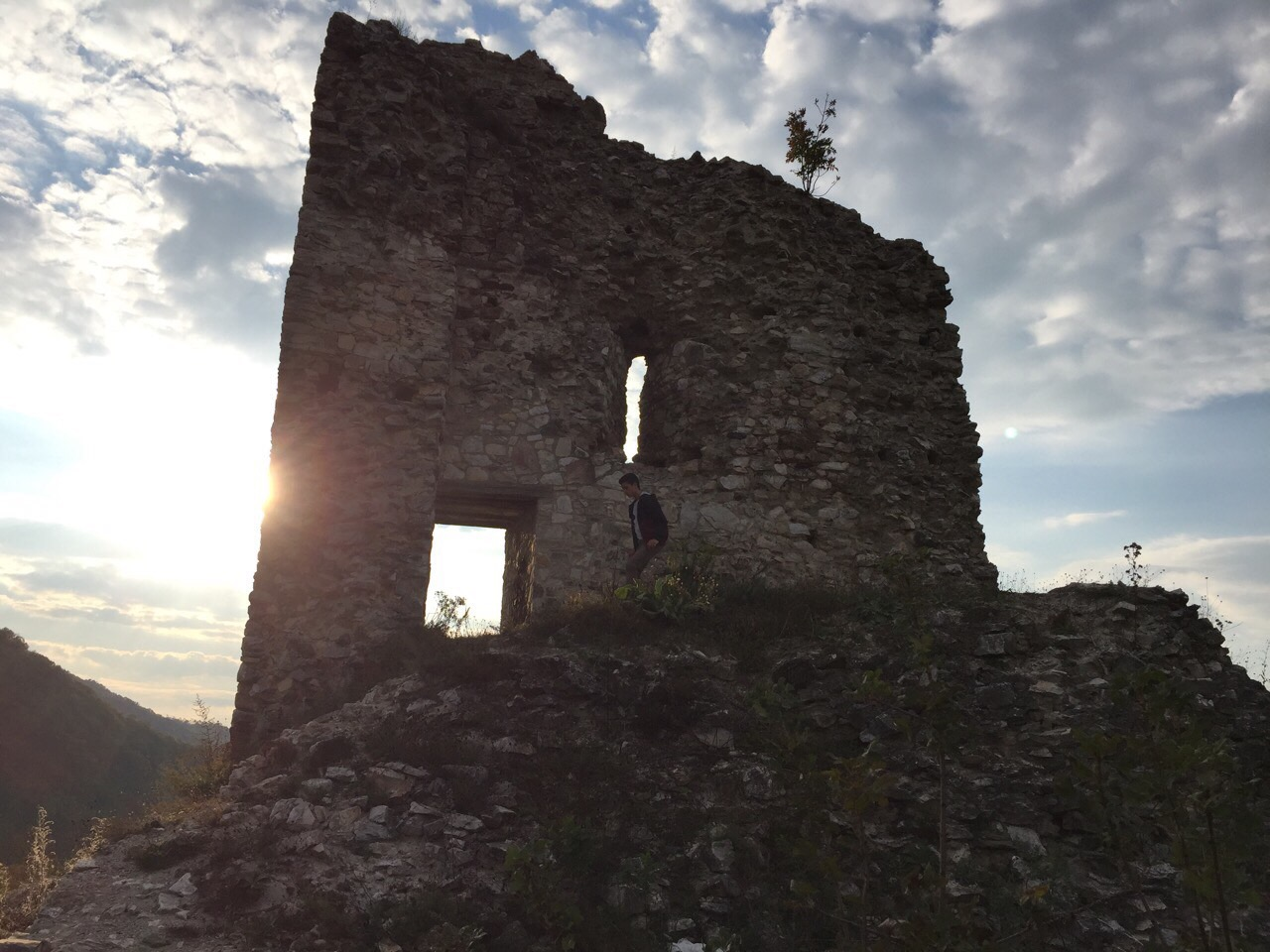
  Pogragja Castle
