= Kaljaja (Balovac) =

Kaljaja is an archaeological site, which is located southeast of the village of Balovac, in municipality of Podujevo. Fortification of an irregular trapezoid shape, with the remains of the ramparts was discovered. Remains follow the terrain configuration. Construction technique was cut stone and brick. Lime mortar was used as a bonding material. In some places the wall is preserved up to a height of 4 meters. At the end of the east, south and west walls the towers were located. The east wall was preserved in the length of 120 meters. The preserved remains of the south wall have the length of 15 meters. The west wall has the hape of an arch, 140 meters in length. North wall had a gate with two towers. The site is rated as a cultural heritage since 1 March 1986, and is under protection of Republic of Serbia.
