= Arben Ramadani =

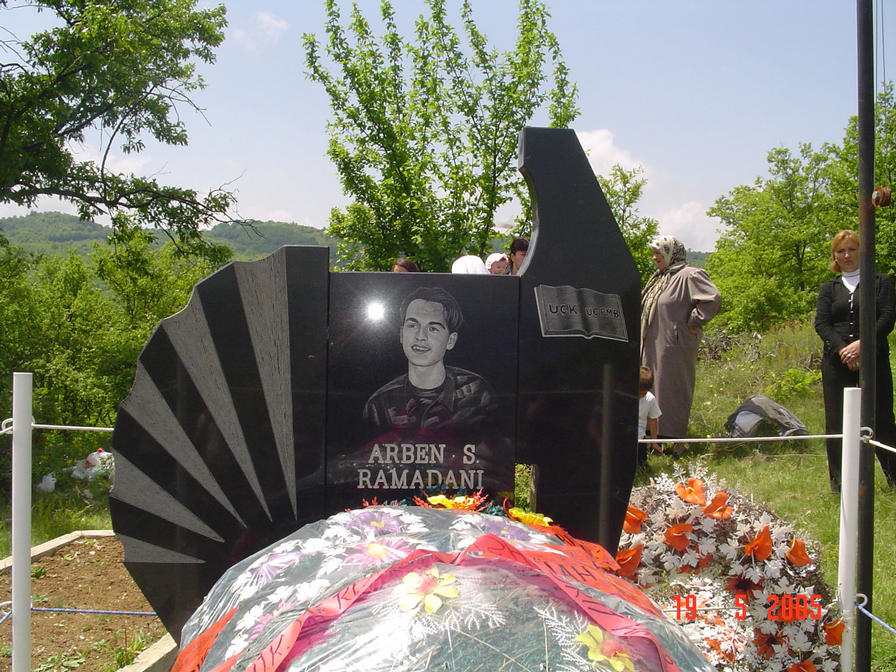
- Born: 13 June 1981; Kokaj, Gjilan, SR Serbia, SFR Yugoslavia (modern Kosovo)
- Died: 19 May 2000 (aged 18); Sojevë, Ferizaj, UN-administered Kosovo
- Cause of death: Internal bleeding
- Military career
- Allegiance: Kosovo Liberation Army; Liberation Army of Preševo, Medveđa and Bujanovac
- Service years: 1998–2000
- Rank: Commander
- Unit: 113th "Ibrahim Fejzullahu"
- Conflicts: Kosovo War; Insurgency in the Preševo Valley †

Arben Sadik Ramadani (13 June 1981 – 19 May 2000) was one of the commanders of the Albanian militant group Liberation Army of Preševo, Medveđa and Bujanovac (UÇPMB). During the insurgency in the Preševo Valley, he was one of the commanders of the 113th "Ibrahim Fejzullahu" Brigade.

== Biography ==
Ramadani was born on 13 June 1981 in Kokaj, Gjilan. He was the second out of the six children of the Ramadani family. In 1998, Ramadani, along with his uncle's son, Ibrahim Fejzullahu, joined the Kosovo Liberation Army. In March 1999, together with Agron Fejzullahu and Besim Mustafa, they joined the group again to fight in the Kosovo War. In 2000 Ramadani joined the UÇPMB. On 19 May, Ramadani was wounded in the shoulder by a gunshot fired from Serbian Police near the Ground Safety Zone in the Preševo Valley.

== Death ==
On 20 May, while he and the 113th "Ibrahim Fejzullahu" Brigade were crossing the border, Ramadani was shot twice in the chest by Serb snipers. He was taken to Camp Bondsteel by a military helicopter for medical treatment, where he died due to internal bleeding. He was buried in his birthplace of Kokaj.
