= Nijazi Ramadani =

Kosovan poet, novelist and literary critic

- Born: February 14, 1964 (age 62); Kokaj, Kosovo, SFR Yugoslavia
- Occupations: Writer, poet, math teacher, artist, journalist
- Children: 3
- Website: kosovapress.comrrjedha.20m.com

Nijazi Ramadani (born February 14, 1964) is a Kosovan poet, novelist and literary critic.

== Early life ==
Ramadani was born on February 14, 1964 in Kokaj, Kosovo, then SFR Yugoslavia. He completed high school in Gjilan. He then graduated from the University of Pristina's Faculty of Education where he completed a degree in Mathematics and Information Technology.

== Work and activity ==
Ramadani edited the periodical Ushtima e maleve, which was described by the Yugoslav authorities as hostile and irredentist. Due to this, and his political alignment with the national movement, Ramadani was arrested and imprisoned in 1981.

He began his poetic writings during the 1980s. He was among the best-known modern representatives of contemporary verse in Kosovo.

Ramadani is known as a literary creator, where his literary creativity is mainly focused on the treatment of national motives, respectively the topic of patriotism.

His main interests lie in literary, journalistic, cultural and political writings, which he occasionally publishes in Albanian dailies and periodicals. He has written for the daily Rilindja, the literary magazines Jeta e Re, Pionieri, Flaka in Skopje, Haemus in Bucharest, and Athina in Athens, along with the Albanian newspapers Shekulli, Koha onna, Bujku and Euro-Rilindja among others. Since 2000, he was worked for the Kosovan daily Epoka e Re and his articles have appeared in papers such as Express, Infopress and the news agency Kosova press. He worked as editor-in-chief at the temporary "Ushtima e maleve" (2001–2002), and the editorial offices of Radio-Albana (in Kumanovo) and Ajo Rinia as a journalist. Some of his works have been translated into other languages.

He is the author of ten books on literature, theater, visual arts and literary criticism, fiction, short stories, novels and drama. He is a member of Kosova Writers Association. He lives and continues to work in Gjilan.

== Notable works ==
1. Albanian geography (Albanian: "Dheshkronjë arbri"), poetry, 1995, publisher: Jeta e Re, Pristina
2. Kosovo and self-determination (Albanian: "Kosova dhe vetëvendosja"), 1998, publisher:editing "Rrjedha"(as co-author)
3. Time image (Albanian: "Imazh kohe" poetry), 2008, publishing house Rrjedha, Gjilan
4. Other accept of theater(Albanian: "Qasje tjeter në teater"), 2008, editing-(publisher): (Albanian: "Rrjedha")
5. Alive image (Albanian: "Imazh i gjallë"), drama-comedy 2013, publisher: Rrjedha, Pristina (MKRS)
6. Frozen image (Albanian: "Imazh i ngrirë"), roman, 2010, publisher: Rrjedha, Pristina
7. Kokaj monograph 1842–2012 (Albanian: "Monografia për Kokajt"), monograph 2012, publisher: (Albanian: "Rrjedha"), Gjilan
8. NIJAZI RAMADANI|- Shtegtim në histori I Gjilani lëvizja dhe rezistenca kombëtare në juglindje të Kosovës 1941 - edit Rrjedha 2020^
9. THJERRËZ, poetry, publisher: "Rrjedha", 2019 Gjilan
