= Kaljaja (Teneš Do) =

Archaeological site in Kosovo

Kaljaja is an archaeological site, which is located in Teneš Do on the hill Kaljaja (municipality of Pristina) in Kosovo.

Remains of fortress walls and buildings were uncovered at the site. Remains of bricks were also found. Based on the traces found on the slope hill Kaljaj it is assumed that the village was burnt. Fragments of ceramics were discovered. Slag heap led to a conclusion that the ore was processed on the site. The site is rated as a cultural heritage since 1 March 1986, and is under protection of Republic of Serbia.
