= Pogragja Fortress =

Cultural heritage monument of Kosovo

- Kalaja e Pogragjës
- Pogragjë, Kosovo
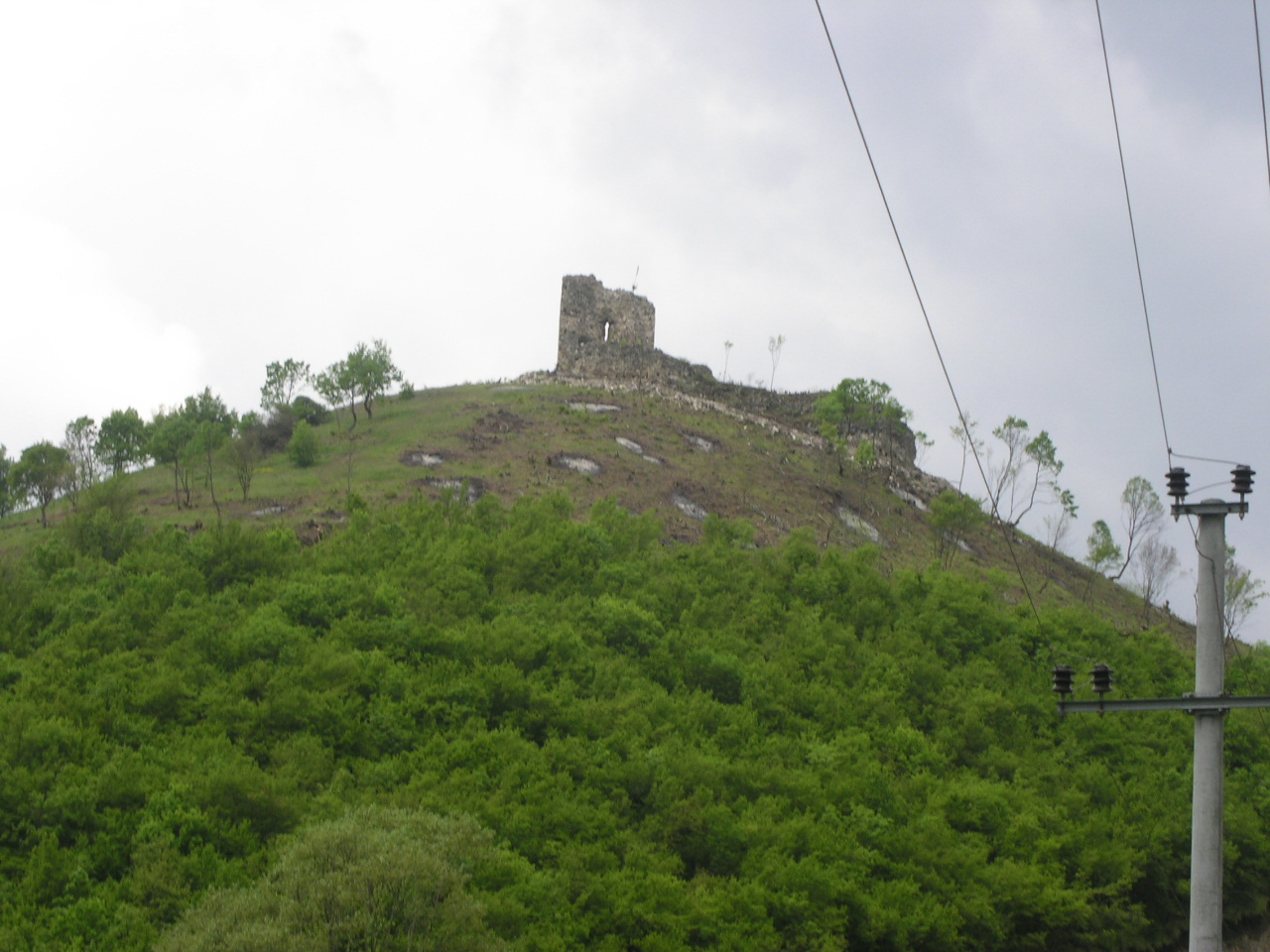
- Upper town of Kalaja

Site information
- Type: fortification
- Condition: Ruins

Location
- Location within Kosovo
- Coordinates: 42°25′37″N 21°33′14″E

Site history
- Built: 6th century
- Materials: Stone, Brick

Pogragja Fortress (Note: Albanian: Kalaja e Pogragjës) is a fortress located near village of Pogragjë, 10 kilometers south-east of Gjilan, Kosovo. It was built on a hill overlooking the confluence of a stream in Morava e Binçës and dates back to 6th century.

== Layout ==
The fortress is situated on a hill that rises about 50 meters above the river valley. It consists of the Lower Town, surrounded by walls and a more preserved citadel (Upper Town) at the top of the hill.

The layout of Upper Town is based on irregular pentagon that follows the shape of the hilltop, with three vertices (southwest, northwest and northeast) reinforced with towers. At the highest point of fortress is a donjon tower, roughly square in plan (about 8x8m) of which are preserved west wall up to a height of about 10 meters with an entrance and part of the south wall with arrowslits, while the remains of the east wall are visible the remains of another arrowslit. The entrance to the Upper Town was located probably northwest of the tower, on the side from which the fort was the easiest to approach, since it shows the remains of the access ramp. Remnants of other buildings were found in the area. Fortress walls are in some places, preserved up to 4 meters in height.

== History ==
The Pogragja Fortress is located 10 km southeast of Gjilan, respectively 1 km from village Pogragjë. It is positioned in the Karadak Mountains, at 567 meters above sea level, on the foothills of which Morava e Binçes river flows. The castle has an interior area of 1.2 hectares and is typical for the Justinian era (6th century), respectively part of the network of fortresses raised in Dardania by the end of late antiquity. This is also proven by written documents and coins found during the castle conservation and exploration activities. The oldest coin found in the castle dates back to 246–249 and holds the portrait of Otacila Severa, the first wife of Philip.

The layout of Pogragja castle's citadel has the shape of an irregular pentagon, whereas the southern wall of the central tower plays the role of citadel's protective wall, which is one of the characteristics of this castle. Pogragja castle possesses three protective walls, qualified as the first, second and third protective wall. One part of these walls is located above ground, whereas the rest is located underground. The first surrounding wall is 17 meters long and 4 meters high; the second wall is 27 meters long, and on the upper part holds vantage towards, the walls of which are up to ten meters high and which have symmetrical square dimensions of 8 by 8 meters. Also, part of the fortress are also smaller dimension towers, placed on its western, northern and southeastern parts, and occasionally continue to maintain 4 meters in height. Walls are constructed with cut and uncut stones, connected with mortar lime adhesive. During the works performed in 2007, an underground channel connecting the interior of the castle with river Morava was found. The castle is also home to the so-called "Milk Stone", which is popularly known as a healing stone. The Pogragja castle represents a monument of great historic, scientific and cultural significance.

== Literature ==
- Иван Здравковић, „Средњовековни градови и дворци на Косову“, Београд, 1975.

== See also ==
- List of fortresses in Kosovo
