= Morava e Binçës =

River in Kosovo, North Macedonia and Serbia

Morava e Binçës Binačka Morava
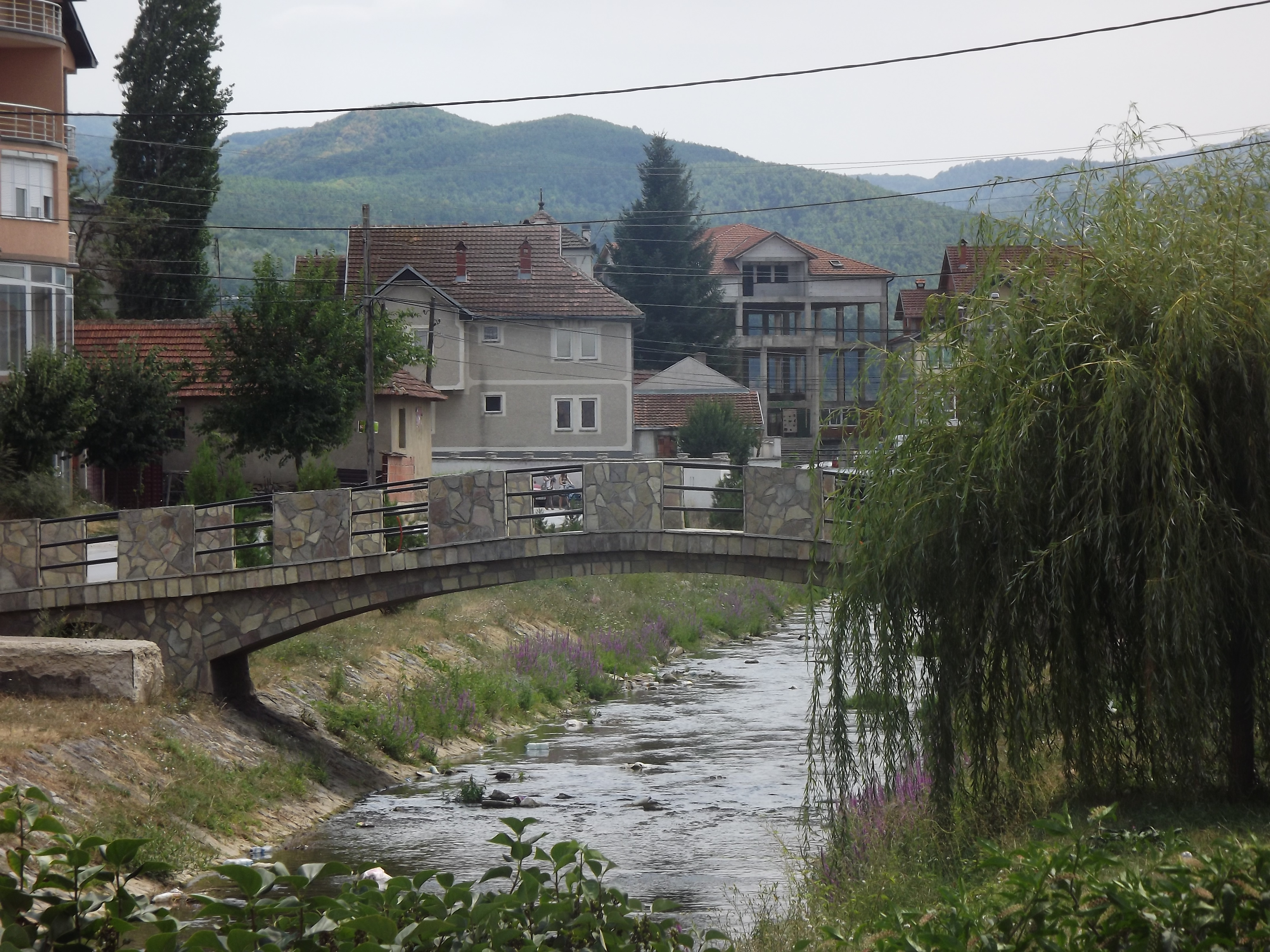
- Morava e Binçës in Viti, Kosovo
- Native name: Morava e Binçës, Mirusha (Albanian); Биначка Морава (Macedonian); Биначка Морава / Binačka Morava (Serbian)

Location
- Countries: North Macedonia; Kosovo; Serbia

Physical characteristics
- Source
  - location: near Skopska Crna Gora in North Macedonia
- Mouth
  - location: with Preševska Moravica forms South Morava at Bujanovac
  - coordinates: 42.4459°N 21.7702°E
- Length: 60 km (37 mi)
- Discharge
  - average: 60 m^{3} (2,100 cu ft)

Basin features
- Progression: South Morava→ Great Morava→ Danube→ Black Sea

Morava e Binçës (Note: Albanian: Morava e Binçës or Mirusha, indefinite form: Mirushë; Macedonian and Serbian Cyrillic: Биначка Морава) is a river which flows in Kosovo, Serbia and North Macedonia. The river has a basin size of 1,564 km^{2} (604 sq mi) and a length of 60 km (37 mi). The river flows for the most part in Kosovo, in the region of Anamorava where it has also given the region the name. Morava e Binçës is a left-tributary of the South Morava.

== Sources ==
The river begins in the mountain of Skopska Crna Gora, in North Macedonia and then flows north right away in Kosovo to continue near Kabash and through Viti. The river then turns into a north-eastern direction passing near several villages in Kosovo before turning in a south-east near Kormjan i Poshtëm village. Nearby the river then enters Serbia near Konçul. The river joins the South Morava just south of Bujanoc.

Streams of Ključevska reka and Slatinska reka join together to form the river Golema, which is, after passing the Macedonian-Serbian border, known as Binačka Morava.

== Gallery ==
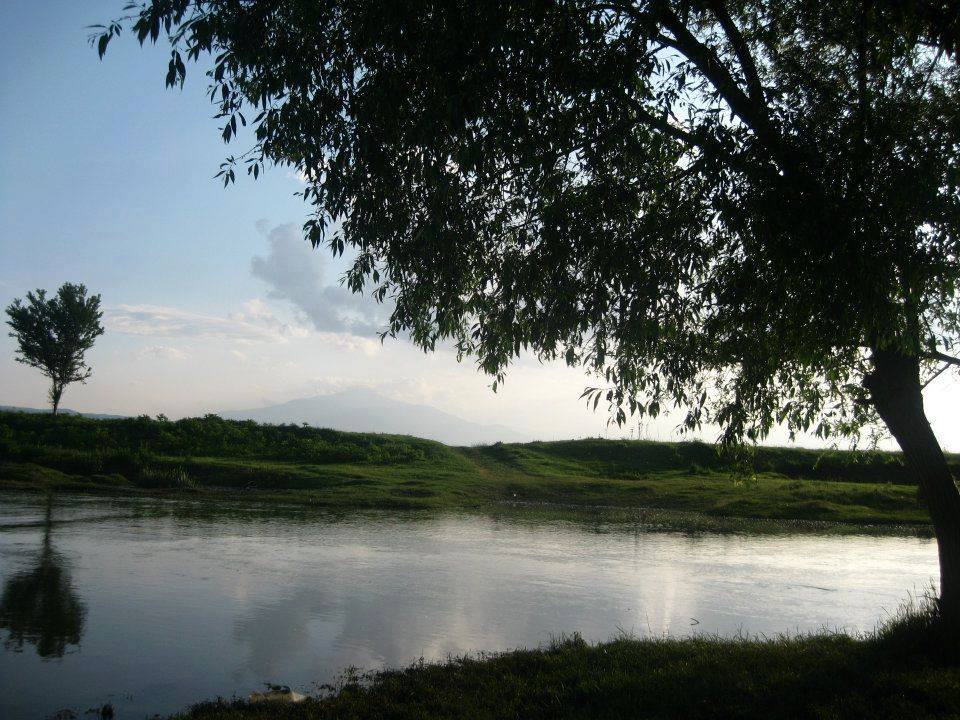
Morava e Binçës further downriver in Anamorava

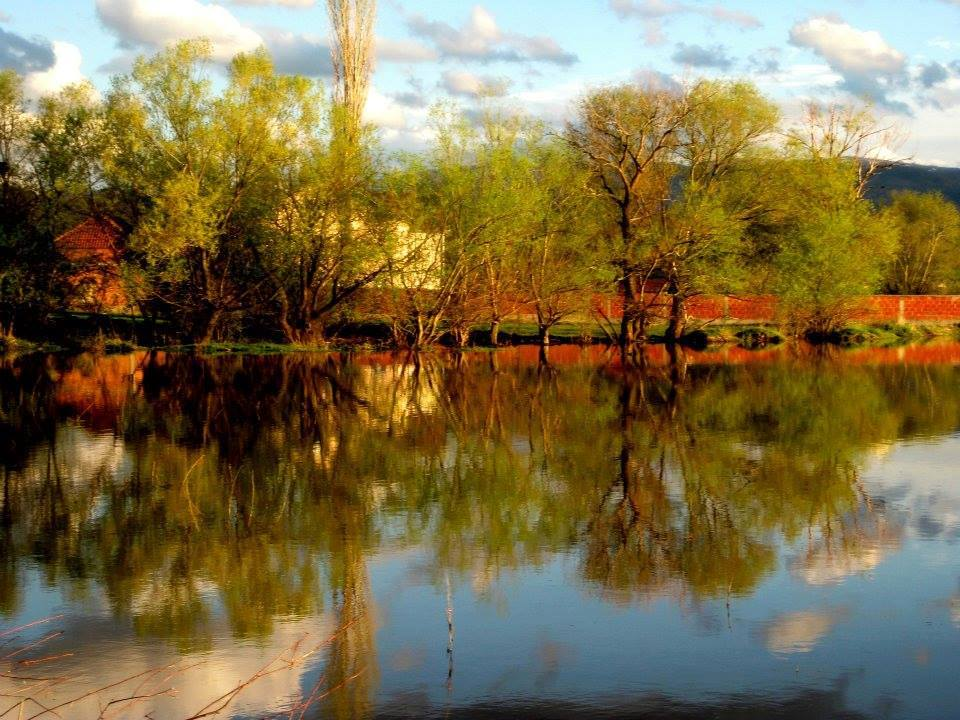
Morava e Binçës flowing near Budrikë
