= Anamorava =

Coordinates: 42°28′N 21°28′E

Anamorava Anamorava or Anamoravë (Albanian) Косовско Поморавље / Kosovsko Pomoravlje (Serbian)
- Valley
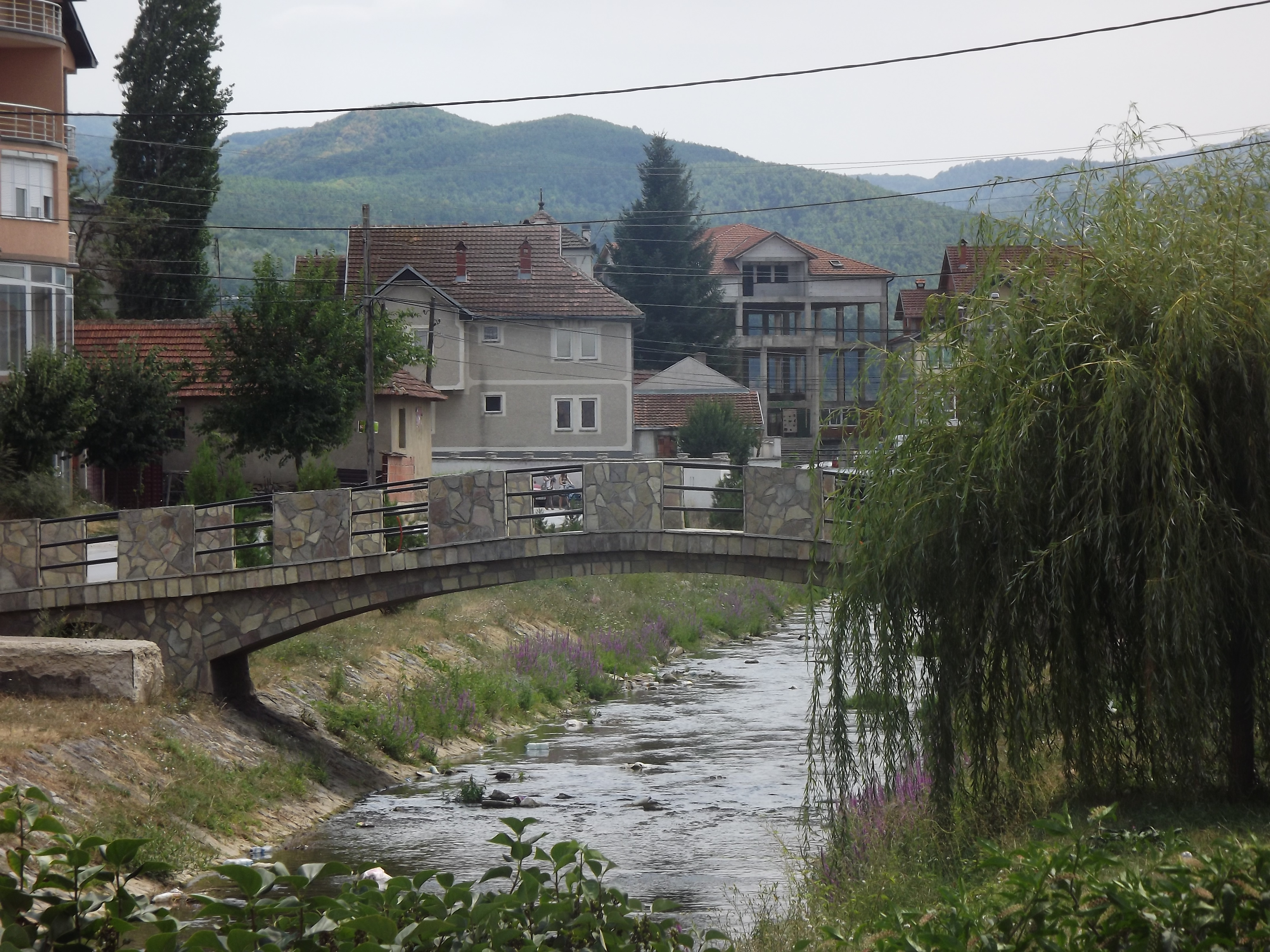
- The Morava e Binçës flows through Viti

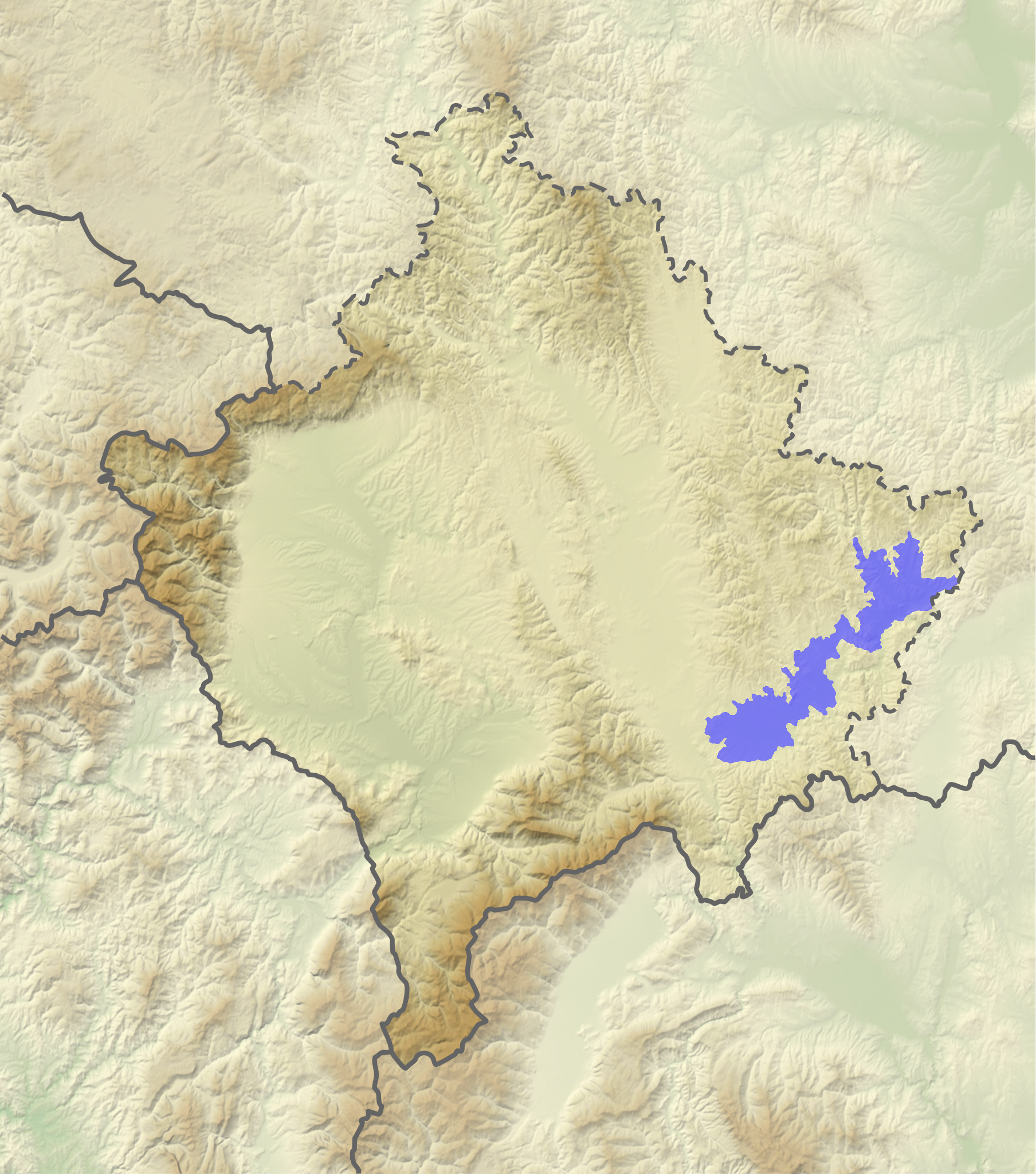
- Anamorava within Kosovo
- Country: Kosovo

Area
  - Total: 650 km^{2} (250 sq mi)

Anamorava (Albanian: Anamoravë), or Kosovo Pomoravlje (Serbian: Косовско Поморавље / Kosovsko Pomoravlje, "Morava Valley of Kosovo"), is a valley in Kosovo, in the southern part of the District of Gjilan surrounding the Morava e Binçës River. It stretches eastward to the Preševo Valley in southern Serbia. The mountains in this region, rising to an altitude of 1,000–1,200 metres (3,300–3,900 ft), border the Skopska Crna Gora region in north of Skopje. Gjilan, Kamenica, Novo Brdo and Viti are municipalities located in the region.

== Name ==
The region is known as Lugina e Anamoravës ("Valley of the side of Morava e Binçës") in Albanian and as Kosovsko Pomoravlje (Косовско Поморавље, "Morava Valley of Kosovo") in Serbian. Its name is derived from the Morava e Binçës river, which flows through northern North Macedonia, eastern Kosovo and southern Serbia as part of the Great Morava river system.

== Geography ==
Anamorava is about 50 kilometres (31 mi) long and 15 kilometres (9.3 mi) wide. It is bordered by the Skopska Crna Gora mountains in the south, Gollak in the north, and Kosovo field in the west. On the east, it borders the Morava Valley. The region's largest city is Gjilan.

The region can be divided into Lower Anamorava and Upper Anamorava, which is also part of the Skopska Crna Gora region.

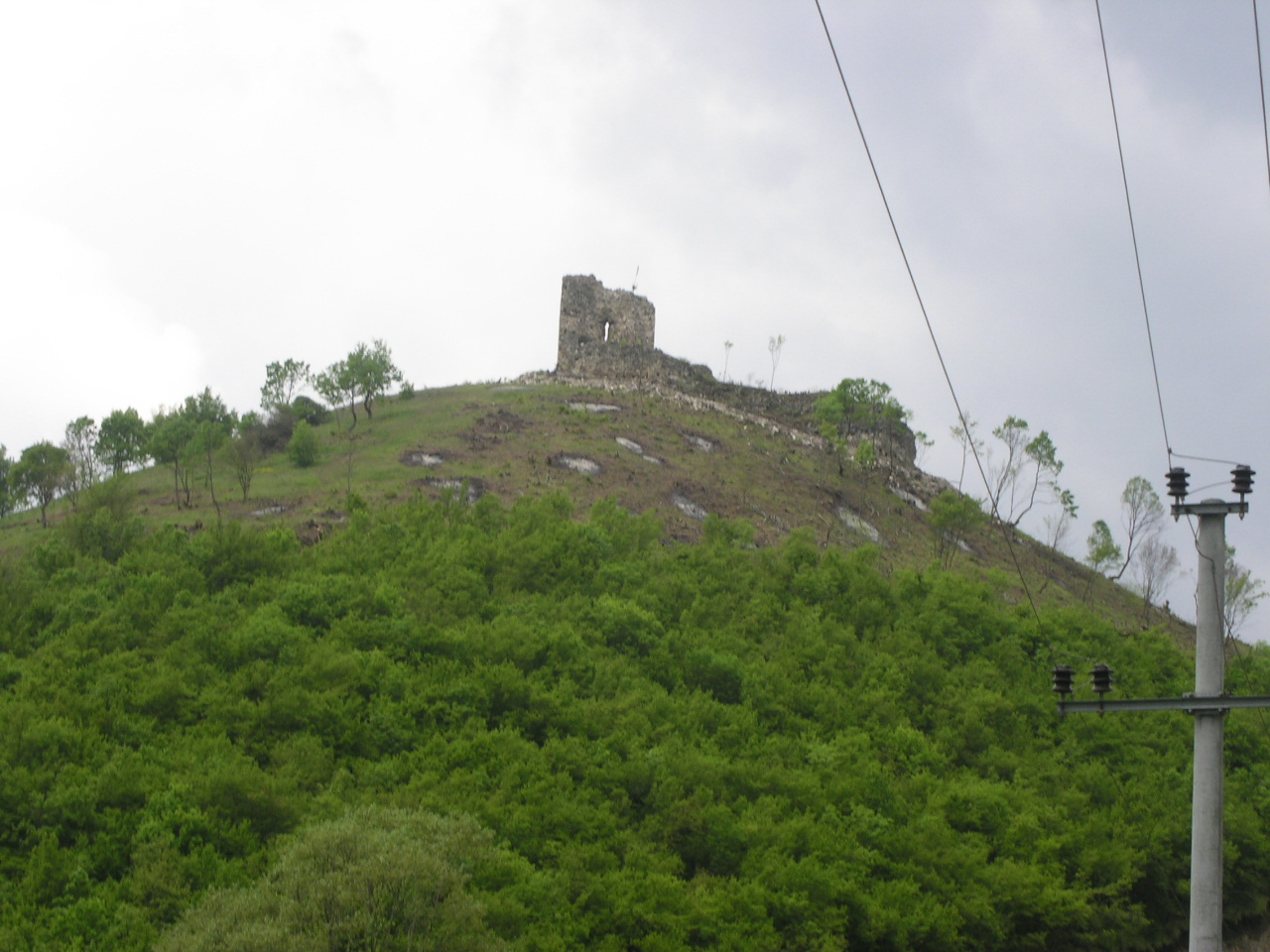
Pogragja Castle (Gjilan), next to the Morava e Binçës

The region includes part of the valley and the Skopska Crna Gora region and Koznik mountains. Gjilan has six municipalities and 287 smaller settlements. The spa in Klokot has several thermal springs valued for their medicinal qualities.

=== Climate ===
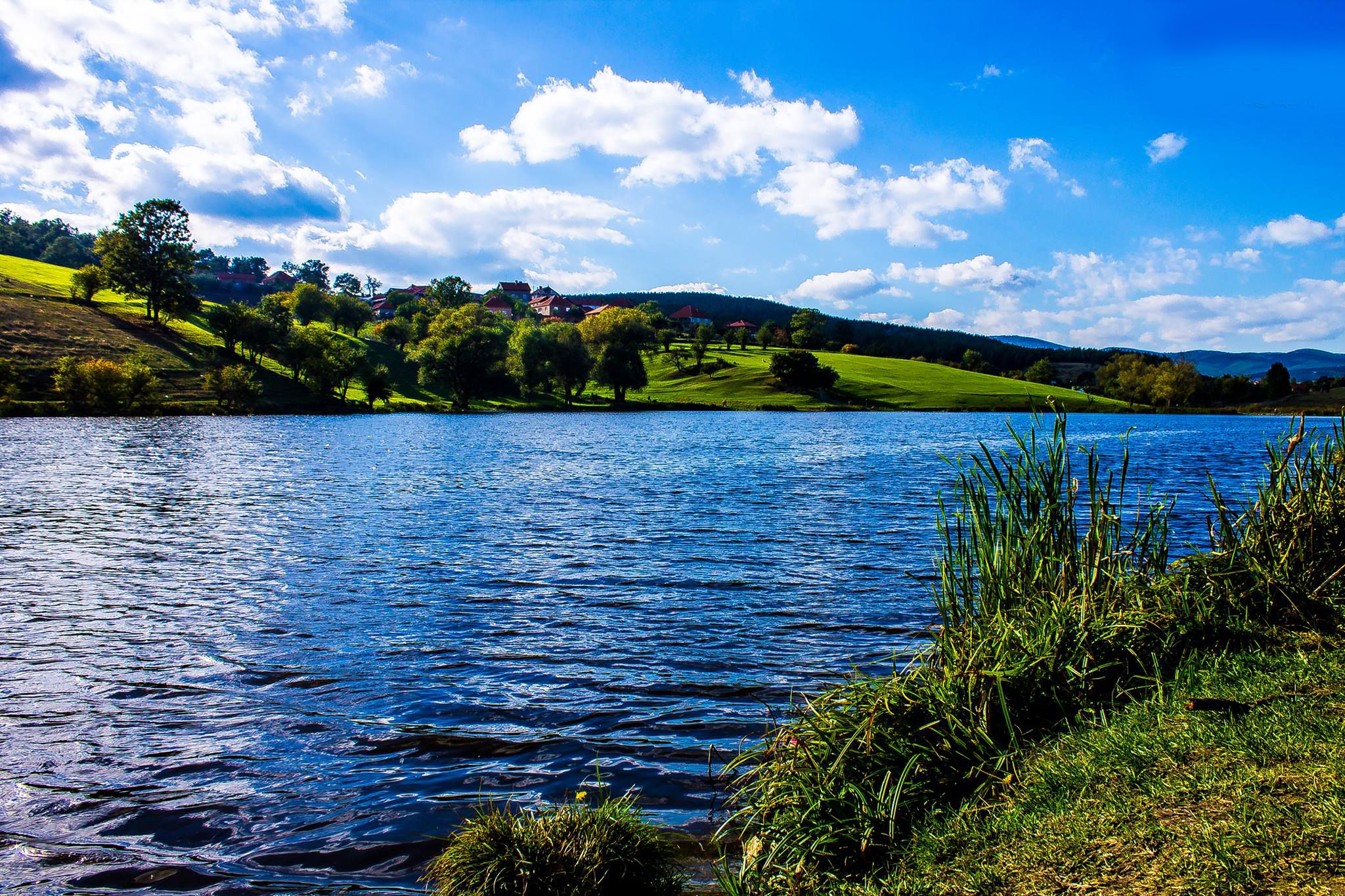
Livoc Lake

At an altitude of 210 metres (690 ft) above sea level, the region has a Mediterranean sub-continental (Koppen classification: humid subtropical) climate with light winds (usually from the southeast). Rainfall is light, and winter often brings rain and wet snow from the north; southern and southwestern winds tend to bring warm, dry weather. The region's average annual temperature is 12.2 °C (54.0 °F). January's average is 1.2 °C (34.2 °F), and July's is 22.6 °C (72.7 °F).

=== Hydrography ===
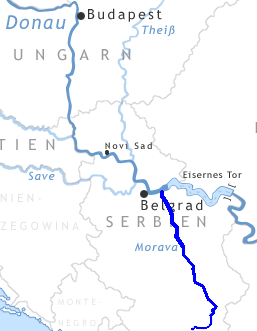
The Morava river system

Tributaries of the Morava river system include the Karadak and Llapushnica rivers. The Preševo Valley is a corridor between the Morava and Vardar valleys, and the Morava valley's wetlands are home to many species of birds.

== Bibliography ==
- Urošević, Atanasije (1935). "Горња Морава и Изморник". СЕ3 51, Насеља и порекло становништва 28. Belgrade.
- Urošević, Atanasije (1931). "Гњилане". Гласник Географског друштва, св. XVII. Belgrade.
- Urošević, Atanasije (1935). Gornja Morava i izmornik. Mlada Srbnja.
