= List of employer associations =

This is a list of employer associations and other business organizations.

== Albania ==
- Konfindustria (Konfederata e Industrive te Shqiperise)

== Austria ==
- Federation of Austrian Industry (Vereinigung der Österreichischen Industrie (VÖI))

== Australia ==
- Master Plumbers and Gasfitters Association of Western Australia (Union of Employers)
- Australian Aluminium Council
- Australian Chamber of Commerce and Industry
- Australian Dental Industry Association
- Australian Federation of Employers and Industries (AFEI)
- Australian Gift & Homewares Association
- Australian Industry Group
- Australian Uranium Association
- Business Council of Australia
- Business Software Association of Australia
- Cotton Australia
- Insulation Council of Australia and New Zealand
- The Pharmacy Guild of Australia
- Victorian Employers' Chamber of Commerce and Industry
- Federal Chamber of Automotive Industry
- Master Grocers Australia

== Belgium ==
- Federation of Enterprises in Belgium (FEB)

== Brazil ==
- National Industry Confederation (CNI)

== Bulgaria ==
- Bulgarian Industrial Association
- Bulgarian Chamber of Commerce and Industry
- Confederation of Employers and Industrialists in Bulgaria
- Union for Private Economic Enterprise

== Canada ==
- Canadian Iron Founders' Association

== Croatia ==
- Croatian Employers' Association

== Czech Republic ==
- Industrial Union of the Czech Republic

== Colombia ==
- National Employers Association of Colombia (ANDI - Asociación Nacional de Empresarios de Colombia)

== Cyprus ==
- Cyprus Employers & Industrialists Federation

== Denmark ==
- Confederation of Danish Industries (Dansk Industry)

== Estonia ==
- Estonian Business Association

== Finland ==
- Confederation of Finnish Industries (EK)

== Fiji ==
- Fiji Commerce and Employers Federation (FCEF)

== France ==
- Fédération nationale des transporteurs routiers
- General Confederation of small and middle size enterprises of France (CGPME)
- Mouvement des Entreprises de France (MEDEF)

== Georgia ==
- Georgian Employers Association (GEA) (საქართველოს დამსაქმებელთა ასოციაცია)

== Germany ==
- Confederation of Industry of Germany (BDI)
- Confederation of Unions of Employers of Germany (BDA)

== Greece ==
- Federation of Greek Industries (Σύνδεσμος Ελληνικών Βιομηχανιών (ΣΕΒ))

== Hong Kong ==
- Employers' Federation of Hong Kong

== Hungary ==
- Hungarian Confederation of Employers' Organizations (CEHIC)
- Confederation of Hungarian Employers and Industrialists (Munkaadók és Gyáriparosok Országos Szövetsége (MGYOSZ))

== Iceland ==
- Confederation of Icelandic Employers

== Indonesia ==
- Indonesian Employers Association

== Italy ==
- Confederation of Italian Industry (CONFINDUSTRIA)
- Association of Small Businesses (Associazione Piccole e Medie Imprese - API)
- Confederation of Agricultural Businesses (CONFAGRICOLTURA)

== Ireland ==
- Irish Business and Employers Confederation (IBEC)

== Jamaica ==
- Jamaica Employers' Federation

== Japan ==
- The Japan Chamber of Commerce and Industry (JCCI)
- The Industry Club of Japan
- Japan Association of Corporate Executives
- Japan Business Federation (and regional associations including Tokyo Employer's Association et al.)
- Japan Automobile Manufacturers Association
- British Chamber of Commerce in Japan
- Japan Entrepreneurs & Presidents Association

== Kenya ==
- Federation of Kenya Employers

== Latvia ==
- Latvian Confederation of Industrialists

== Mauritius ==
- Mauritius Employers' Federation

== Mexico ==
- Coparmex (Confederación Patronal de la República Mexicana)

== Morocco ==
- General Confederation of Moroccan Enterprises (CGEM)

== The Netherlands ==
- VNO-NCW (Verbond van Nederlandse Ondernemingen, Nederlands Christelijk Werkgeversverbond)

== New Zealand ==
- BusinessNZ

== Norway ==
- Confederation of Norwegian Enterprise (NHO)
- Enterprise Federation of Norway (Hovedorganisasjonen Virke)
- Norwegian Federation of Craft Enterprises (NHO Håndverk)

== Poland ==
- Association of Industry, Commerce and Finance of Poland
- Chamber of Economy of the Republic of Poland

== Portugal ==
- Portuguese Association of Industry

== Romania ==
- Concordia Employers' Confederation - Romanian member of BusinessEurope
- National Confederation of Romanian Employers "General Union of Romanian Industrialists" UGIR-1903 - Founded 1903

== Singapore ==
- Singapore National Employers Federation

== Slovakia ==
- National Union of Employers
- Federation of Employers Associations of Slovakia

== Slovenia ==
- Slovenian employers Association

== South Korea ==
- Federation of Korean Industries (FKI)

== Spain ==
- Employers Confederation of Spain
- Confederation of Employers and Industries of Spain (CEOE)
- The National Federation of Self-Employed workers and small entrepreneurs Associations in Spain (ATA Federation)

== Sweden ==
- Confederation of Swedish Enterprise
- Swedish Agency for Government Employers

== Switzerland ==
1) National organisations

- economiesuisse
- Union patronale suisse (Schweizerisches Arbeitgsbegerverband)
- Union suisse des arts et métiers (Schweizericher Gewerbeverband)
- Swissmem (machine industry)

2) Regional organisations

- Fédération des Entreprises Romandes Genève
- Fédération patronale vaudoise
- Gewerbeverband Basel-Stadt
- Kantonaler Gewerbeverband Zürich

== Tunisia ==
- Tunisian Confederation of Industry, Trade and Handicrafts (created in 1947)
- Tunisian Union of Agriculture and Fisheries (created in 1949)
- Confederation of Tunisian Citizen Enterprises (created in 2011)

== United Kingdom ==
- Building and Engineering Services Association (BESA)
- Confederation of British Industry (CBI)
- Convention of Scottish Local Authorities
- Improvement and Development Agency for Local Government (IDeA)
- Federation of Small Businesses
- Institute of Directors (IoD)
- London Councils
- National Farmers' Union
- NHS Confederation
- Universities and Colleges Employers Association(UCEA)

See also: Regional employers organisations.

== United States ==
- Anti-Boycott Association
- Associated Builders and Contractors
- Better Business Bureau
- California Employers Association
- Chicago Building Contractors' Council
- Citizens' Alliance
- Illinois Coal Operators' Association
- Lake Carriers' Association
- Mine Owners' Association
- National Association of Manufacturers
- National Erectors' Association
- National Founders' Association
- National Metal Trades Association
- Stove Founders' National Defense Association
- United States Chamber of Commerce

== Venezuela ==
- Fedecamaras
- Consecomercio
- Fedenagas

== International ==
- International Organisation of Employers
- Mobile Payment Services Association
- World Shipping Council

=== Europe ===
- Confederation of European Business (BUSINESSEUROPE)
- Federation of International Employers (FedEE)

== See also ==
- List of labor unions
