= Albania–Kosovo relations =

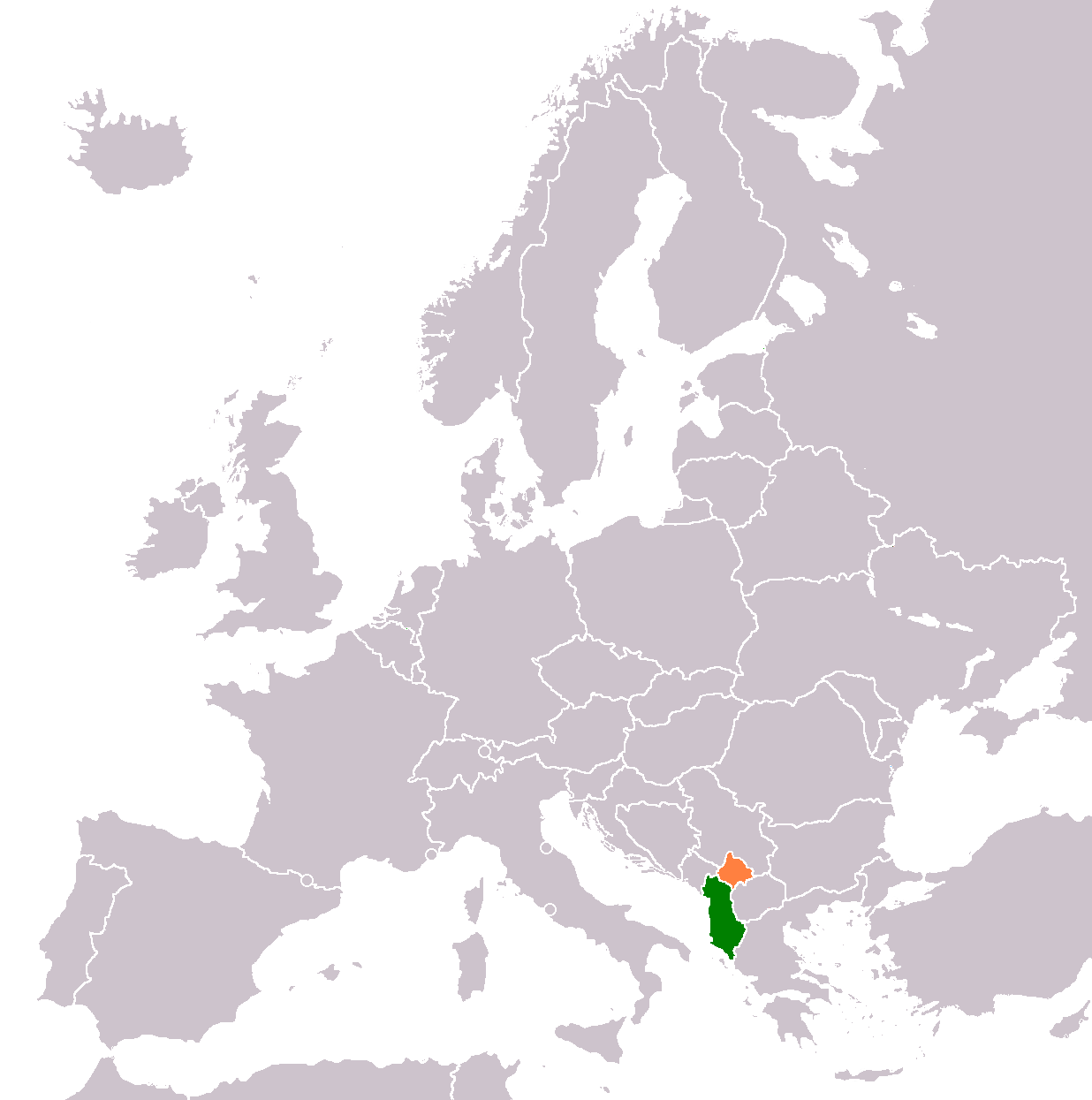
- Albania: Kosovo

Diplomatic mission
- Embassy of Albania, Pristina: Embassy of Kosovo, Tirana

Envoy
- Ambassador Qemal Minxhozi: Ambassador Nait Hasani

Albania and Kosovo have bilateral relations. Albania has an embassy in Pristina and Kosovo has an embassy in Tirana. There are 1.8 million ethnic Albanians living in Kosovo – officially 92.93% of Kosovo's entire population – and Albanian is an official language and the national language of Kosovo. Likewise, the people of the two countries have similar and shared traditions and folklore. Albanians in both countries view the two as 'one nation, two states'. Kosovo was the site of several movements in Albanian nationalism, such as the League of Prizren. In addition, the strong relations are highlighted in successive polls showing majority of ethnic Albanians in both states wanting unification, including recent data from 2024 indicating overwhelming support in Albania and a clear majority in Kosovo. Despite this public sentiment, both governments uphold the existence of two independent states and prioritize Euro-Atlantic integration.

As a full member of the North Atlantic Treaty Organization (NATO), Albania supports Kosovo in its NATO-integration path.

== History ==
=== Modern ===
On 22 October 1991, Albania was the only country whose parliament voted to recognise the Republic of Kosova, which had been proclaimed independent in 1991. Official support was limited to the declaration. In 1994, when the Bosnian conflict escalated, Albania took a step back by recognising Yugoslavia's borders, which included Kosovo.

=== Independence ===
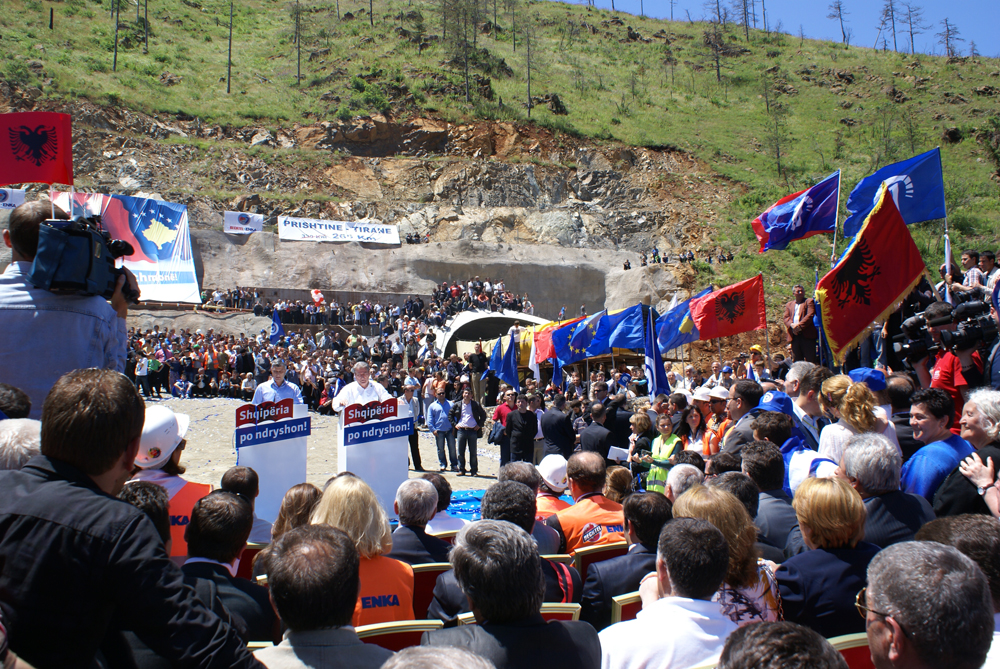
Prime ministers Hashim Thaçi of Kosovo and Sali Berisha of Albania at the opening of Kalimash tunnel

When Kosovo declared its independence from Serbia on 17 February 2008, Albania became one of the first countries to officially announce its recognition of the Republic of Kosovo. Diplomatic relations were established the following day.

On 18 August 2009, Prime Minister Sali Berisha of Albania was quoted as saying, "There should be no customs administration between the two countries. We should by no means allow Albania and Kosovo to view each other as foreign countries". This comment outraged Serbia.

The Albanian Foreign Ministry, in a clarification note to Serbia, said: "Albania considers the independent state of Kosovo as a factor of peace and stability in the Balkan region, whereas its independence is considered as a clear step serving people, stability and European perspective of the region". It also said that the foreign policy of the Republic of Albania "is based on common objectives of Euro-Atlantic integration of the country, Republic of Kosovo and entire region".

==== 2019 Albania earthquake ====
On 26 November 2019, an earthquake struck Albania. €500,000 were sent by the government of Kosovo and over €3,500,000 were sent by the Kosovar population. 110 specialised operators of the Kosovo Police were dispatched, as were 40 members of the Kosovo Security Force's Urban Search and Rescue Units. President Hashim Thaçi was part of a presidential delegation that visited the earthquake epicentre and expressed his condolences on behalf of Kosovo. On 29 November 2019, outgoing Kosovo Prime Minister Ramush Haradinaj and his possible successor Albin Kurti visited Durrës to survey the damage and expressed Kosovan commitment to relief efforts and the need for institutional cooperation between both countries. Displaced people have been relocated to Kosovo with 500 residing in a camp in Prizren established by the Kosovo government.

The Kosovo Albanian population reacted with sentiments of solidarity through fundraising initiatives and money, food, clothing and shelter donations. Volunteers and humanitarian aid in trucks, buses and hundreds of cars from Kosovo traveled to Albania to assist in the situation and people were involved in tasks such as the operation of mobile kitchens and gathering financial aid. Many Albanians in Kosovo have opened their homes to people displaced by the earthquake.

== Relations ==
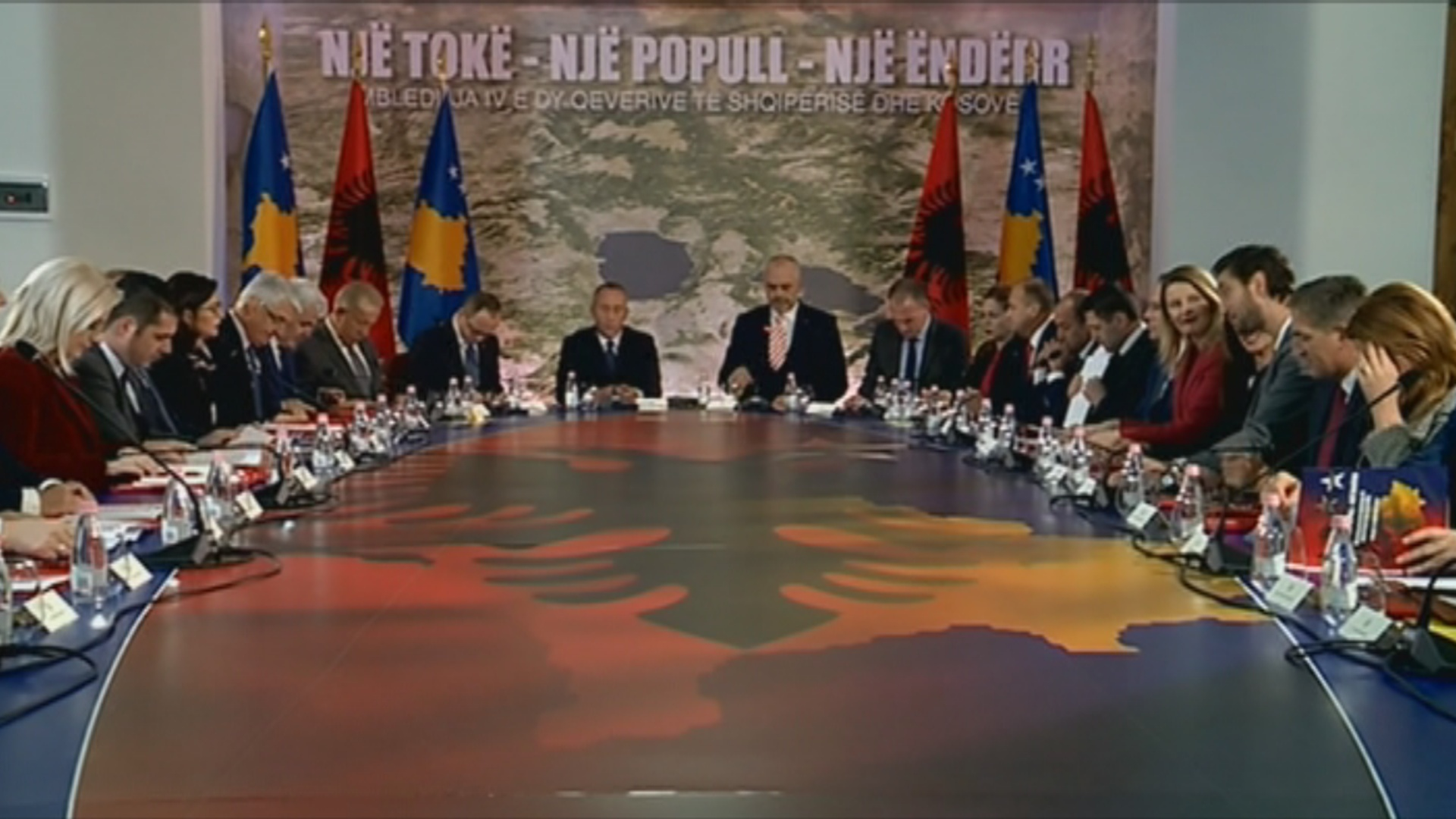
Fourth two-government Meeting in 2017

=== Cultural ===
In October 2011, an agreement was reached between the Ministry of Culture of Kosovo and that of Albania on the common use of embassies and consular services, and in May 2012, a common primer for the 2012–13 academic year of first class students was approved by both governments.

Since 2014, the Governments of the two countries have also decided to establish a common cultural calendar and a platform for the conservation and promotion of Albanian cultural heritage.

=== Economic ===
The Albanian Konfindustria proposed the idea of an Albanian regional market in 2008, and the idea about a common economic space between Albania and Kosovo was discussed by Kosovo government officials in 2011.

Since Kosovo's Independence, both countries have strengthened their ties through key transport, energy, and tourism projects. Major initiatives include the construction of a highway linking their capitals, which reduced travel time and boosted economic exchange, and a 400 kW energy interconnection inaugurated in 2015 that facilitates electricity exchange. Tourism represents another important area of cooperation, with hundreds of thousands of Kosovars vacationing in Albania each year.

They were reinforced especially by Behgjet Pacolli in some of his speeches in Albania: he claimed that the economic union would increase competition towards the EU. Pacolli's ideas were endorsed by the Party for Justice, Integration and Unity.

Since the beginning of 2019 there has been a customs office of the Republic of Kosovo in the Durrës Port. This simplifies the import of goods to Kosovo and relieves the Vërmica/Morina border crossing. Albania and Kosovo are gradually harmonizing their customs systems and are striving for a customs union in the long term.

==== Albania-Kosovo Railway ====
Plans are also underway to build a railway connecting the two countries. In April 2025, the governments of Albania and Kosovo approved a feasibility study and masterplan for a 105.8-kilometre railway linking Tirana and Pristina. The project, estimated at around €700 million, foresees the construction of numerous bridges and tunnels and will connect major cities in both countries through existing rail networks.

According to the feasibility study document, the planned railway connection between Albania and Kosovo focuses on the Shkodër–Gjakova segment, as the Durrës–Shkodër section will use the existing Vorë–Hani i Hotit railway line currently under tender procedures. The study foresees 43 bridges and 14 tunnels along this segment, with tunnels totaling 35.3 km in length and an estimated cost of €1.8 billion, the majority of which is allocated to construction.

The Shkodër–Gjakova railway line will span 105.8 km and include seven stations. The project is expected to be completed over a 10-year period and implemented in five phases before the railway connection between Albania and Kosovo becomes operational.

As part of Albania’s 2026 budget planning, the Durrës–Prishtina railway project has entered a new phase, marked by a formal request for financing. The project is valued at around €1.9 billion, with approximately €370 million proposed for allocation in 2026, pending review and approval within the state budget framework.

=== Free Movement ===
After various attempts to remove border controls, in May 2025 Albania and Kosovo instated a free-movement arrangement that eliminates border checks at key crossings. Citizens of both countries can pass through the Morina and Vërmica checkpoints without passport or ID controls for most of the year, enabling faster and unrestricted travel. The measure applies for nine months annually and aims to reduce congestion and facilitate travel, particularly during the summer season when large numbers of Kosovars visit Albania.

=== Security ===
Albania and Kosovo have deepened bilateral defence cooperation through the signing of various agreements, strengthening coordination between their defence institutions and their shared commitment to regional and international security.

In May 2021, both defence ministers signed a cooperation agreement that further institutionalized military collaboration between the two countries and reaffirmed their joint commitment to regional security and Euro-Atlantic integration.

Despite over 30 agreements aimed at enhancing security cooperation, a gap between formal agreements and operational reality is identified, particularly influenced by political discord between the Prime Ministers of Kosovo and Albania, Albin Kurti and Edi Rama, respectively.

On 18 March 2025, Kosovo and Albania, together with Croatia, signed a declaration on military cooperation aimed at strengthening the integration of their defence strategies and systems. The trilateral initiative seeks to enhance security and stability in a context of growing insecurity in Southeastern Europe and globally. It defines four shared priorities: the joint development of military capabilities through industrial co-investment, improved interoperability of armed forces, cooperation in countering hybrid threats through intelligence sharing, and the promotion of Kosovo’s integration into the NATO defence ecosystem. The alliance remains open to expansion beyond the Western Balkans, with Bulgaria mentioned as a potential future member.

== Resident diplomatic missions ==
- Albania has an embassy in Prishtina.
- Kosovo has an embassy in Tirana.

== See also ==
- Foreign relations of Albania
- Foreign relations of Kosovo
- Albania–Serbia relations
- Accession of Albania to the European Union
- Accession of Kosovo to the European Union
- Unification of Albania and Kosovo
- Kosovo Albanians
- Albania–Yugoslavia relations
