= Fedee =

Fedee may refer to:

- Dominic Fedee, a Saint Lucian politician
- Sergio Fedee, a Saint Lucian cricketer
- Federation of International Employers or FedEE

== See also ==
- Feedee, the person being fed in fat fetishism
