= Calle Benito Corbal =

Street in Pontevedra, Spain

Benito Corbal Street
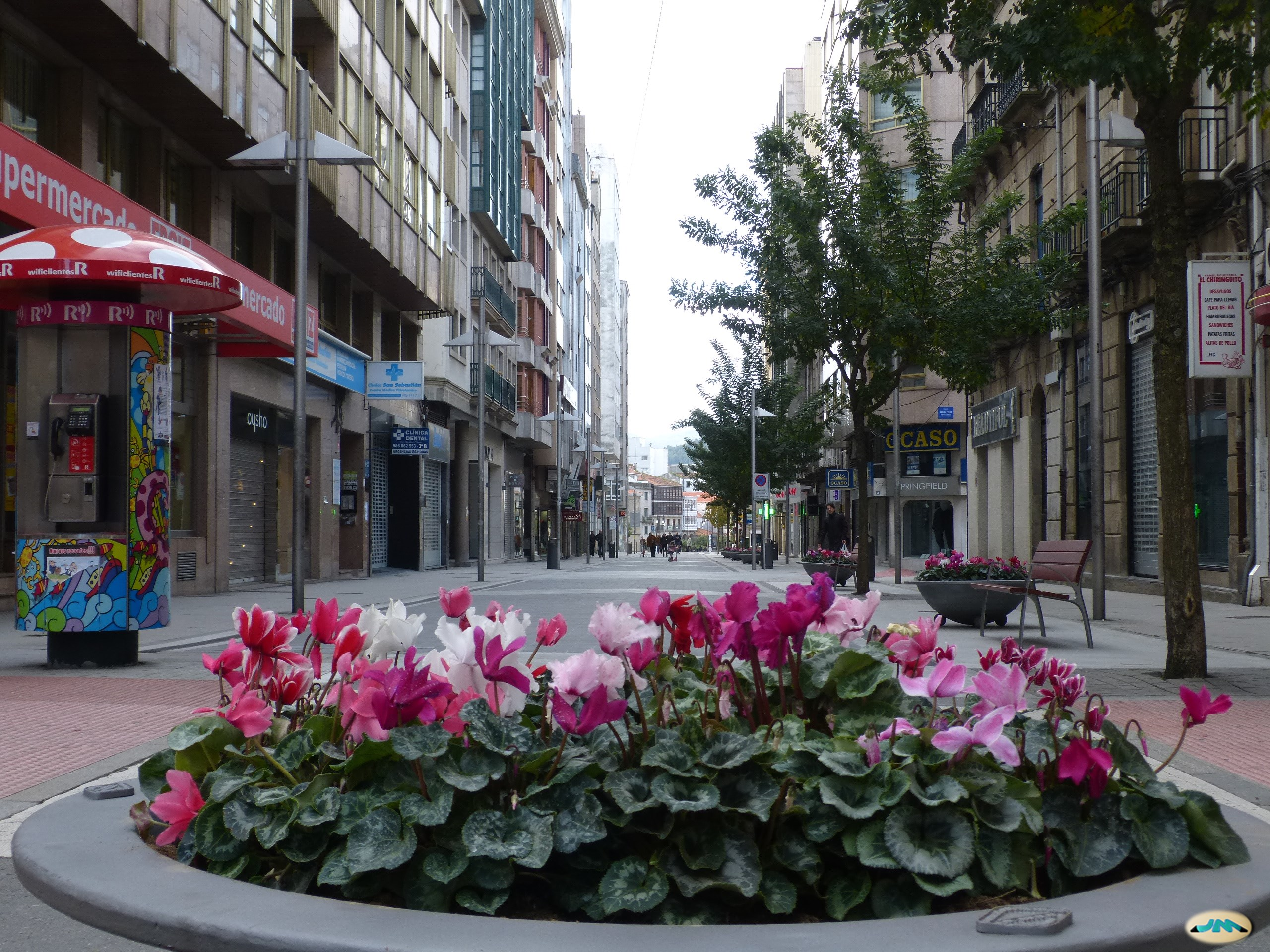
- Benito Corbal Street, pedestrian zone
- Native name: Calle Benito Corbal (Spanish)
- Type: Street
- Maintained by: Pontevedra City Council
- Location: Pontevedra, Spain
- Postal code: 36001
- Coordinates: 42.430224°N 8.640864°W

The calle Benito Corbal is a street in Pontevedra (Spain) located in the first urban expansion area of the city. It is one of the main streets of Pontevedra, known as the "Golden Mile".

== Origin of the name ==
Since 1928, the street has been dedicated to the Pontevedra businessman and politician Benito Corbal (1853–1926). He was responsible for the transfer of the fairground to the Plaza de Barcelos and for the construction of more than 80% of the buildings in the street that bears his name (including his own house at number 34).

== History ==
The origins of the present Benito Corbal Street lie in the layout of the new road to Ourense, which in 1844 replaced the Camino Viejo de Castilla (old Castilian road) as the main exit from the city to Castile. This new access road to the city, the most central part of which corresponds to the present-day Benito Corbal Street, came close to the church of the Pilgrim Virgin.

In 1868, the part of the old walls of Pontevedra located between the Trabancas gate and the convent of Saint Francis was demolished to open up a passage from the Herrería square to the new road to Ourense.

The street became the main axis of the city's development, monopolising most of the activity in the construction sector. For this reason, on 28 April 1894, the Pontevedra City Council agreed to name it Calle Progreso (Development Street), from the Herrería square to the Pontevedra Provincial Hospital, which had just begun construction.

In 1909, the Progreso Hotel was inaugurated at number 21 of the street, in a remarkable new stone building with three floors and an attic. It was one of the landmarks of the city's social life and, for half a century, it hosted major weddings and celebrations until its demolition in 1974.

In 1915, due to the increase in traffic on the street, the Gran Garaje building was inaugurated on a plot of land that previously housed a garage used as a stop for horse-drawn carriages.

In 1926, after the death of Benito Corbal, the president of the employers' organisation of Pontevedra, supported by more than two thirds of the inhabitants of the street, requested that Progreso Street be named after Benito Corbal, because he was a hard worker and a lover of Pontevedra. The street was renamed on 18 April 1928.

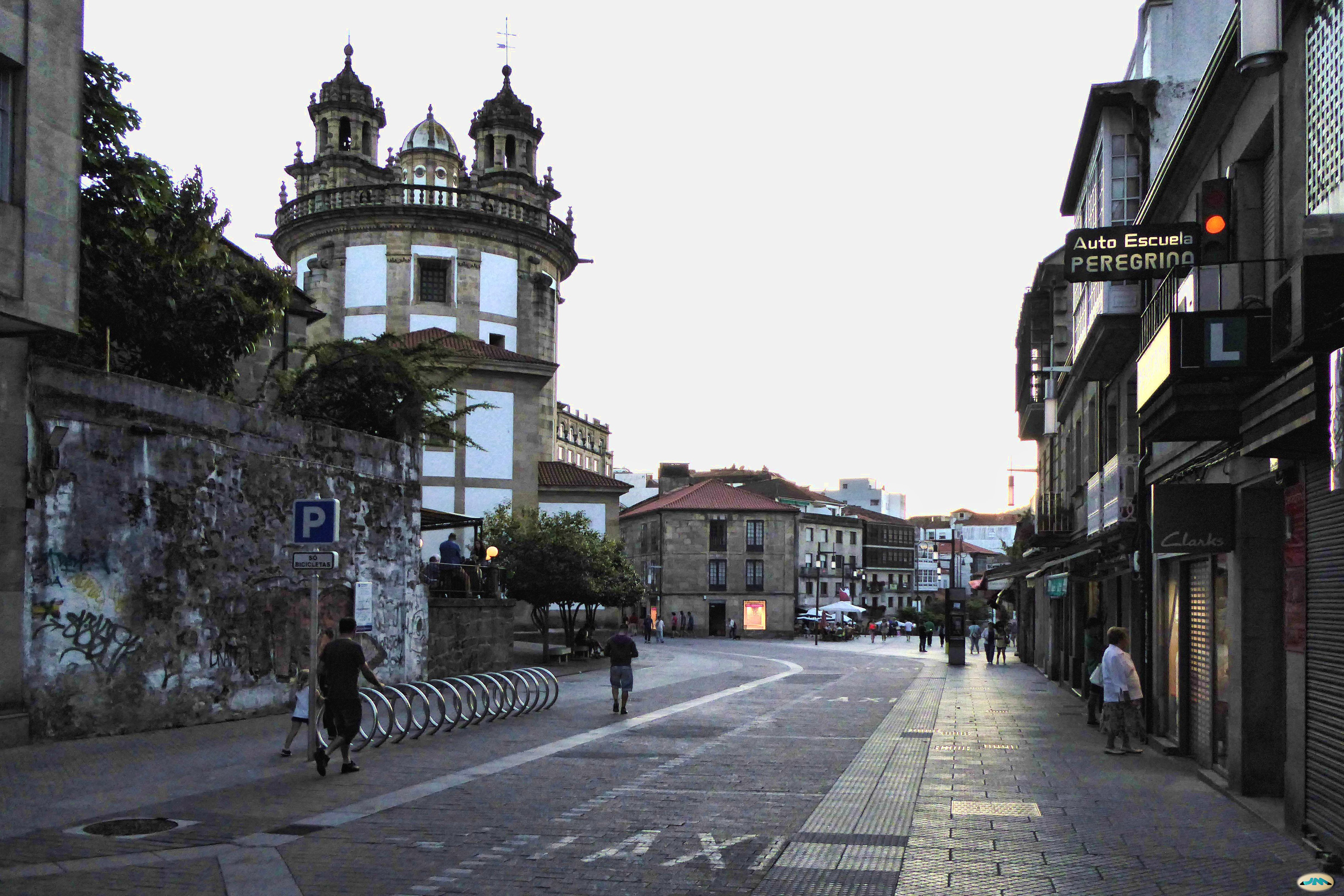
First section of the street on the edge of the historic centre.

In 1938, the Calixto restaurant (closed in 1992) was born in this street, because its founders thought it was necessary to feed those who stopped at their post house. It was the first restaurant in Pontevedra to be mentioned in the Michelin Guide.

In 1943, one of the most important cinemas in the city was opened at number 15 Benito Corbal Street, with a capacity of 1200 spectators, the Victoria Cinema, which closed at the end of March 2002 with the screening of the French film Amélie.

In 1951, due to the increase in the number of cars and road traffic, the famous Costa Giráldez petrol station was opened at number 49 of the street. The land was ceded by Valentín Costa Giráldez to the municipality. The premises, which was a car park, garage and petrol station in one, remained open until the end of 2017.

In 1958, the iconic Universo Hotel opened its doors on the corner of Benito Corbal and Sagasta streets. Its garden extended to the intersection of Cruz Gallástegui Street. With its café, restaurant, nightclub and tea rooms, it was a point of reference in the social life of Pontevedra and marked an era in the city. The hotel closed its doors in 1977.

Also in 1958, at number 47 of the street, a building was inaugurated for the Provincial Headquarters of the Movement, which was completely renovated with the arrival of democracy. At the end of the 1970s, it became the headquarters of the Provincial Office of the Ministry of Culture of the province of Pontevedra. On 30 June 1986, after a complete interior and exterior renovation, it became the headquarters of the Xunta de Galicia in the province of Pontevedra and opened its doors on 20 October 1986. In 2018, the building was completely renovated and reopened on 17 June 2019.

On 15 November 2013, the pedestrian zone of the first section of Benito Corbal Street, between Daniel de la Sota Street and Sagasta Street, was inaugurated.

On 10 March 2022, the Gadis supermarket chain opened its largest supermarket in Galicia in an urban area, with two floors and 2,200 square metres of sales area, after a complete renovation of the old Costa Giráldez building.

== Description ==
It is a street in the heart of the city centre, half a kilometre long, straight and predominantly flat. Its average width is 12 metres.

It is a central street in the first urban expansion area of the city, pedestrianised between the Peregrina square and the Herreria square, on the edge of the historic centre of Pontevedra, and the Sagasta street, with one lane of traffic and two pavements from Sagasta street to Cobián Areal street. The entire street is lined longitudinally with Japanese pagoda trees on its northern side.

Many streets converge in its course, from west to east: Daniel de la Sota, Cobián Roffignac, Xenaro Pérez de Villamil (towards the Barcelos square), Sagasta, Vasco da Ponte, Lepanto (pedestrian), Blanco Porto and Javier Puig.

It is one of the main streets of the city and one of its focal points, where the city's largest shopping area is located, with numerous shops and national and international franchises.

== Outstanding buildings ==
In Benito Corbal Street there were many art nouveau buildings from the early 20th century that disappeared when they were demolished as a result of the development and property speculation of the 1970s and 1980s in the city.

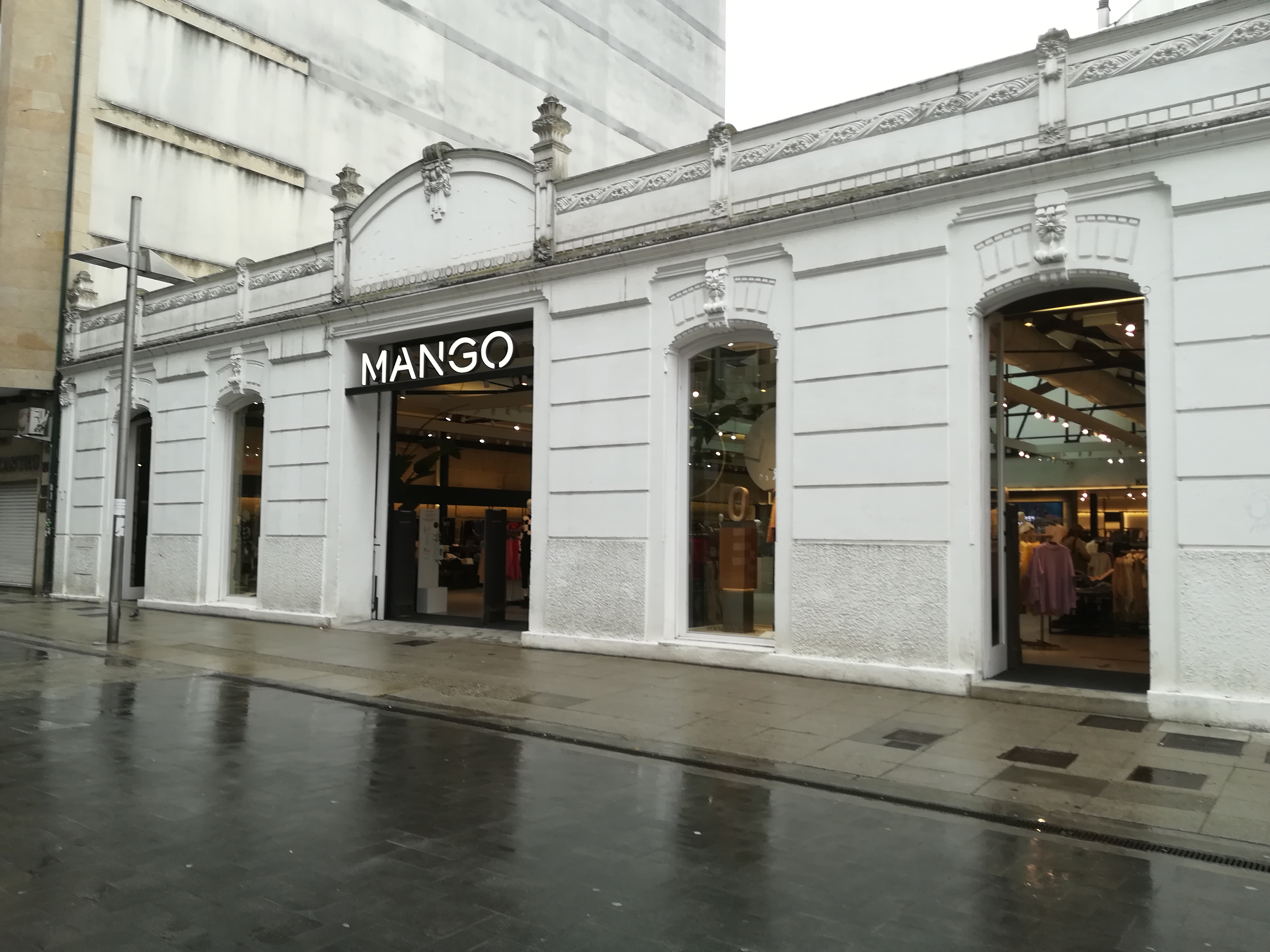
Art Nouveau Gran Garaje building at number 8.

The beginning of the street coincides with the back of the Church of the Pilgrim Virgin, one of the most iconic buildings in Pontevedra, classified as a Site of Cultural Interest. It is a circular baroque temple with neoclassical elements and a scalloped plan, completed in 1792.

The buildings at numbers 1, 5 and 9 of the street, on the edge of the historic city centre, close to the church of St. Francis Convent, date from the 19th century.

At number 8 of the street is the art nouveau Gran Garaje building. Built in 1915, it is one of the few remaining examples of art nouveau buildings in the city. It is remarkable for the white colour of its façade and its decoration. It currently houses a shop of the Mango clothing company.

At number 17 is the Domínguez building, a four-floor stone building designed by the architect José Barreiro Vázquez, built between 1947 and 1949. At number 11, on the corner of Cobián Roffignac Street, there is another five-storey stone building, the Martínez Building, designed in 1948 by the architect Juan Argenti Navajas.

At number 47 of the street is one of the buildings of the Xunta de Galicia in the city, which during the last two decades of the 20th century was its main headquarters in Pontevedra. At the end of the 1970s it was the provincial headquarters of the Ministry of Culture and in 1986 it was completely renovated. It was fully renovated again in 2019 and acquired its characteristic blue colour on the outside.

== Gallery ==
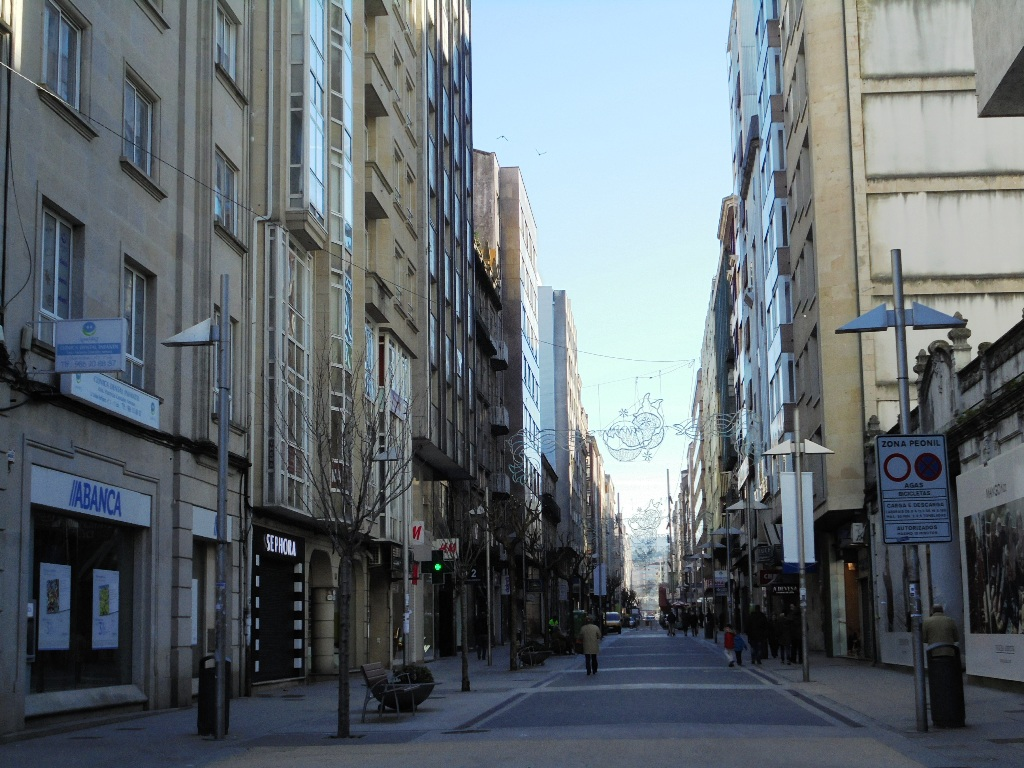
Pedestrian area from Daniel de la Sota Street to Sagasta Street

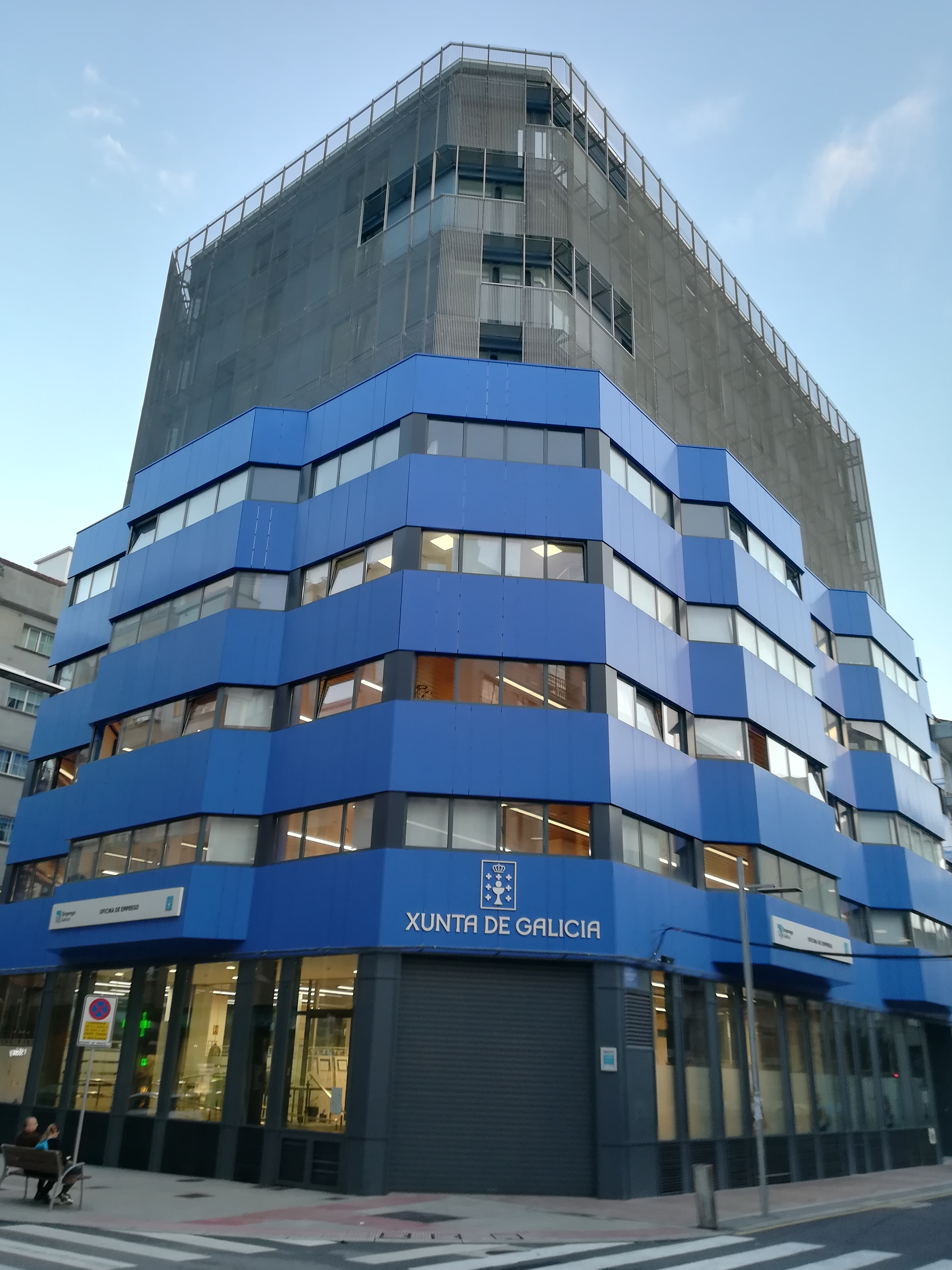
Administrative building of the Xunta de Galicia at number 47

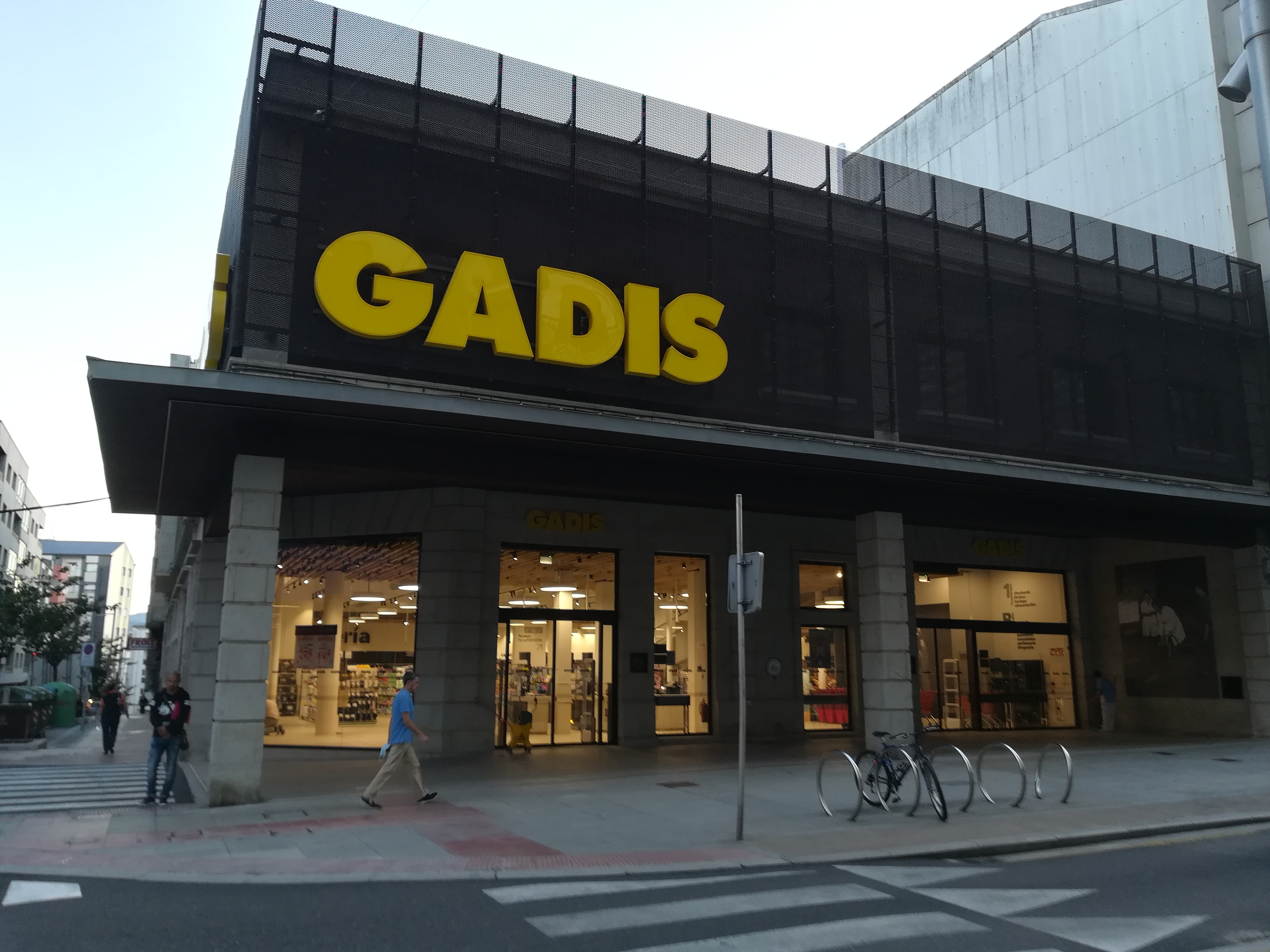
Street number 49

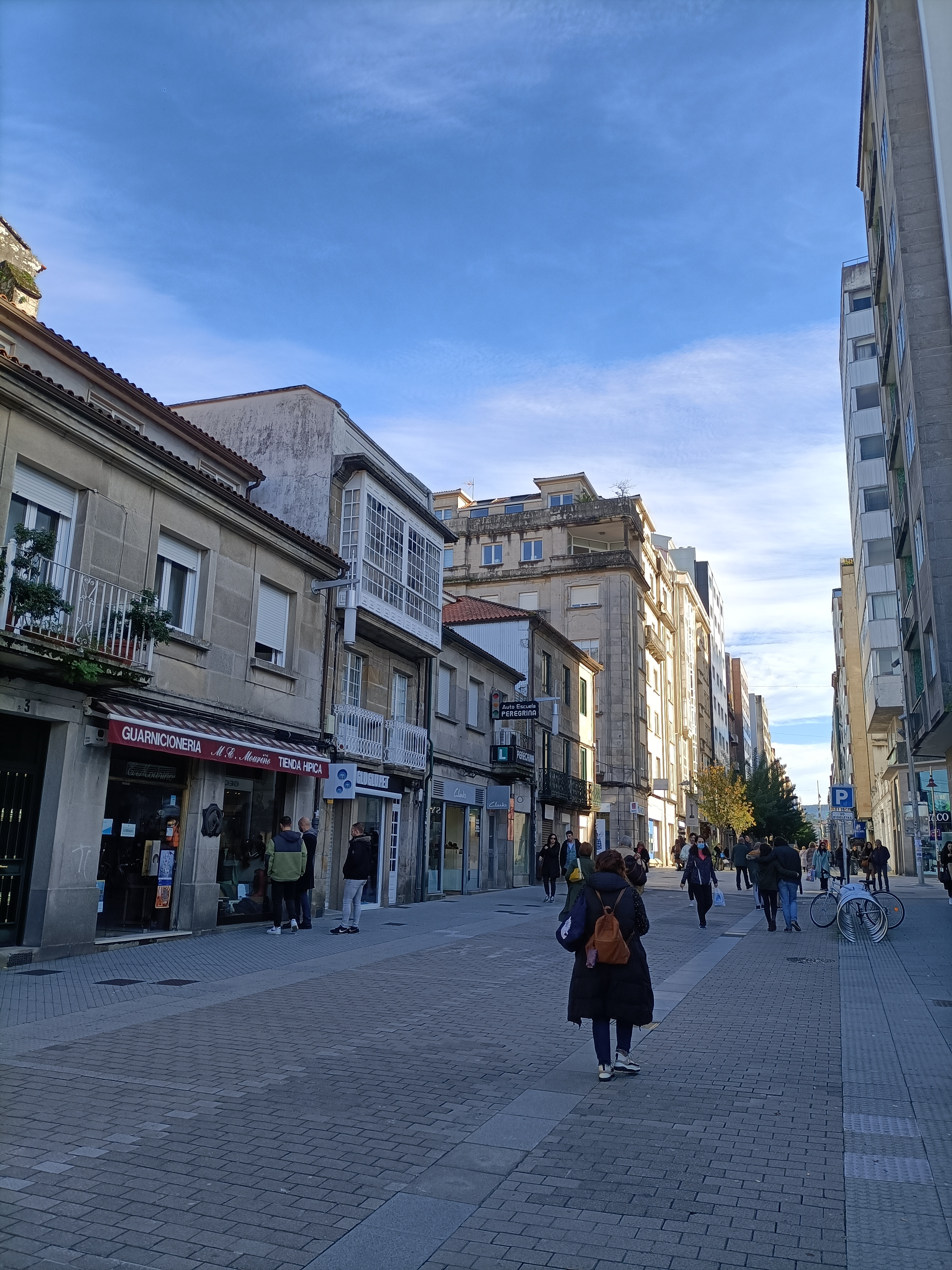
First section of the street

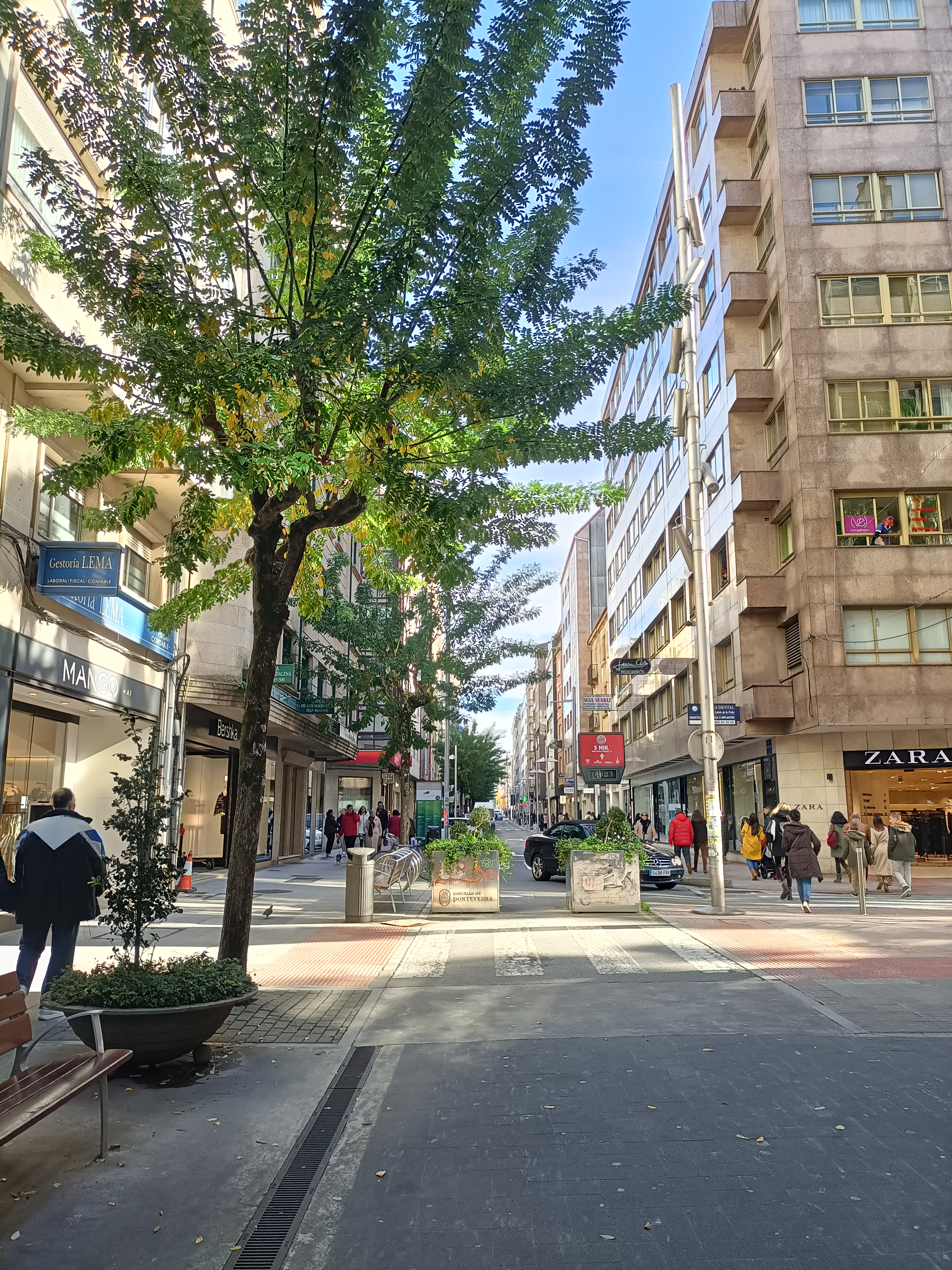

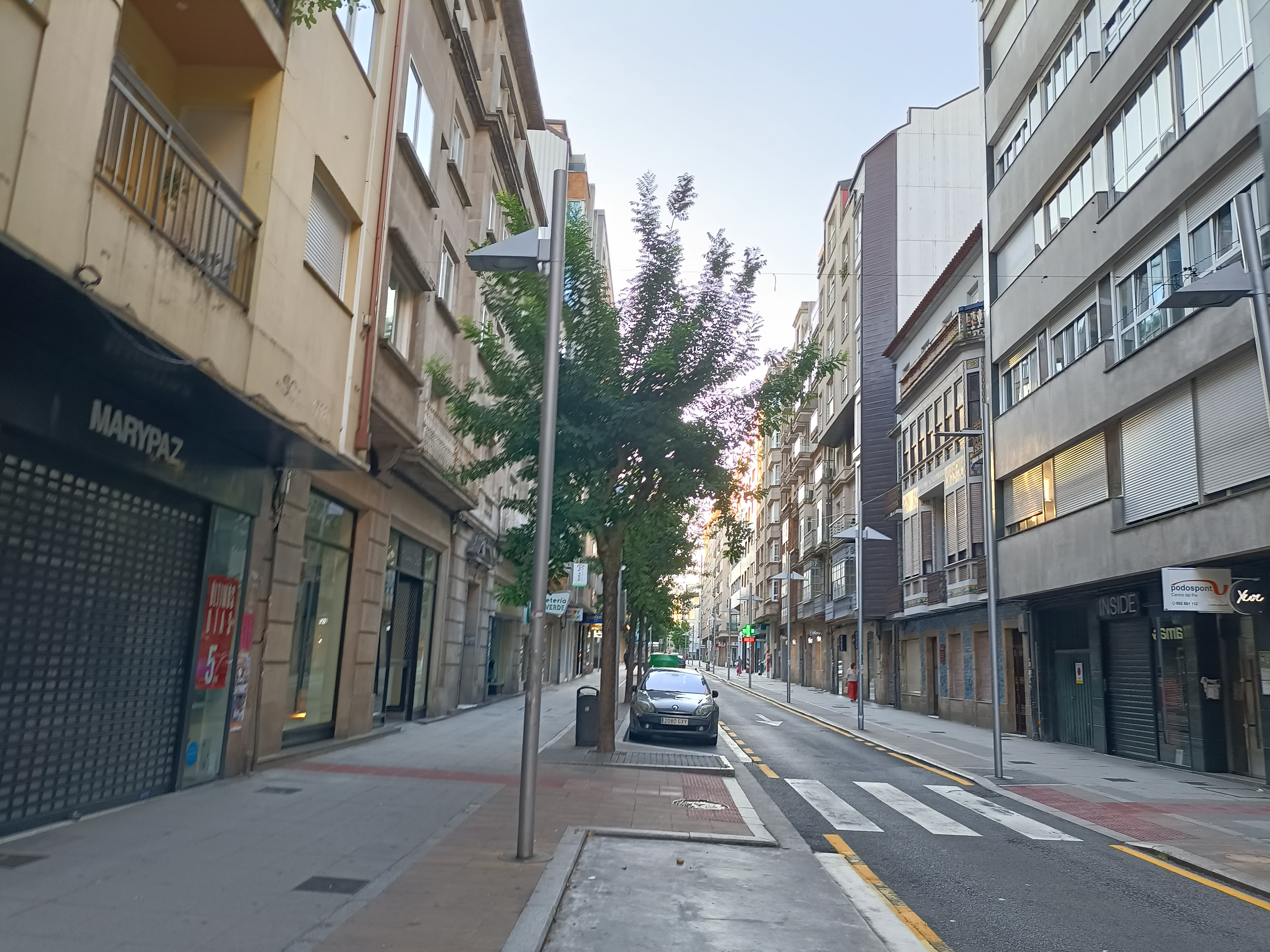

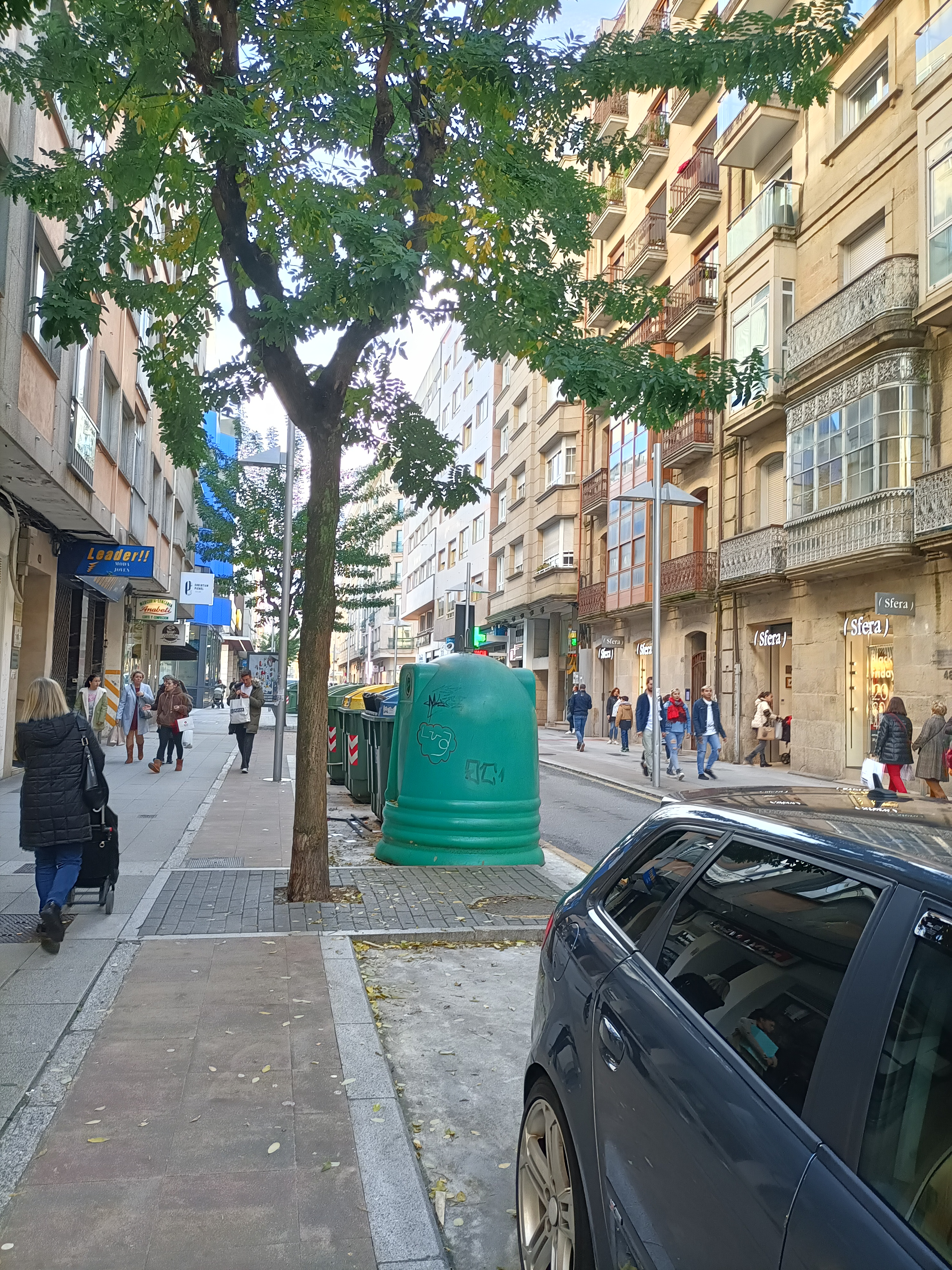

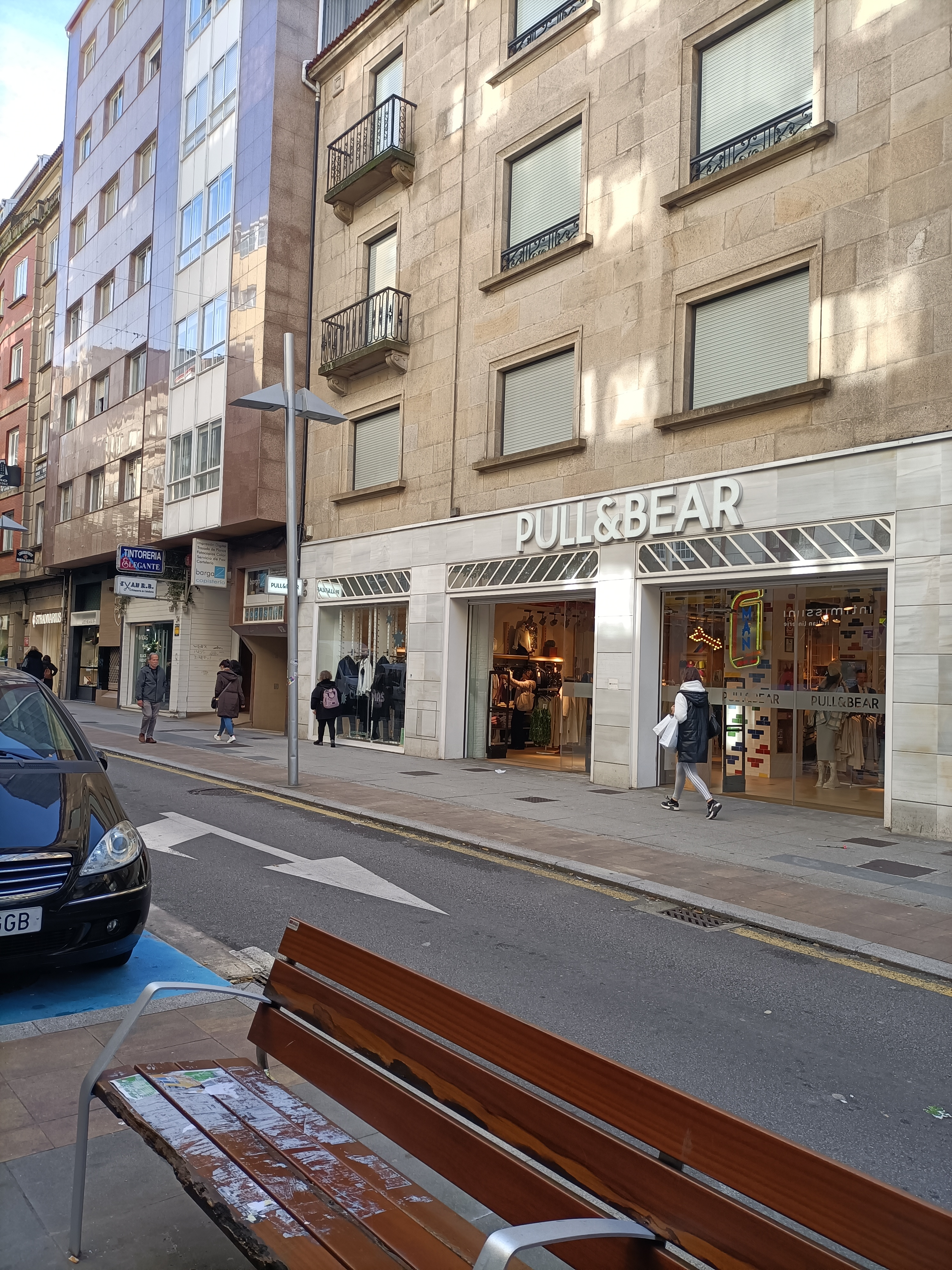

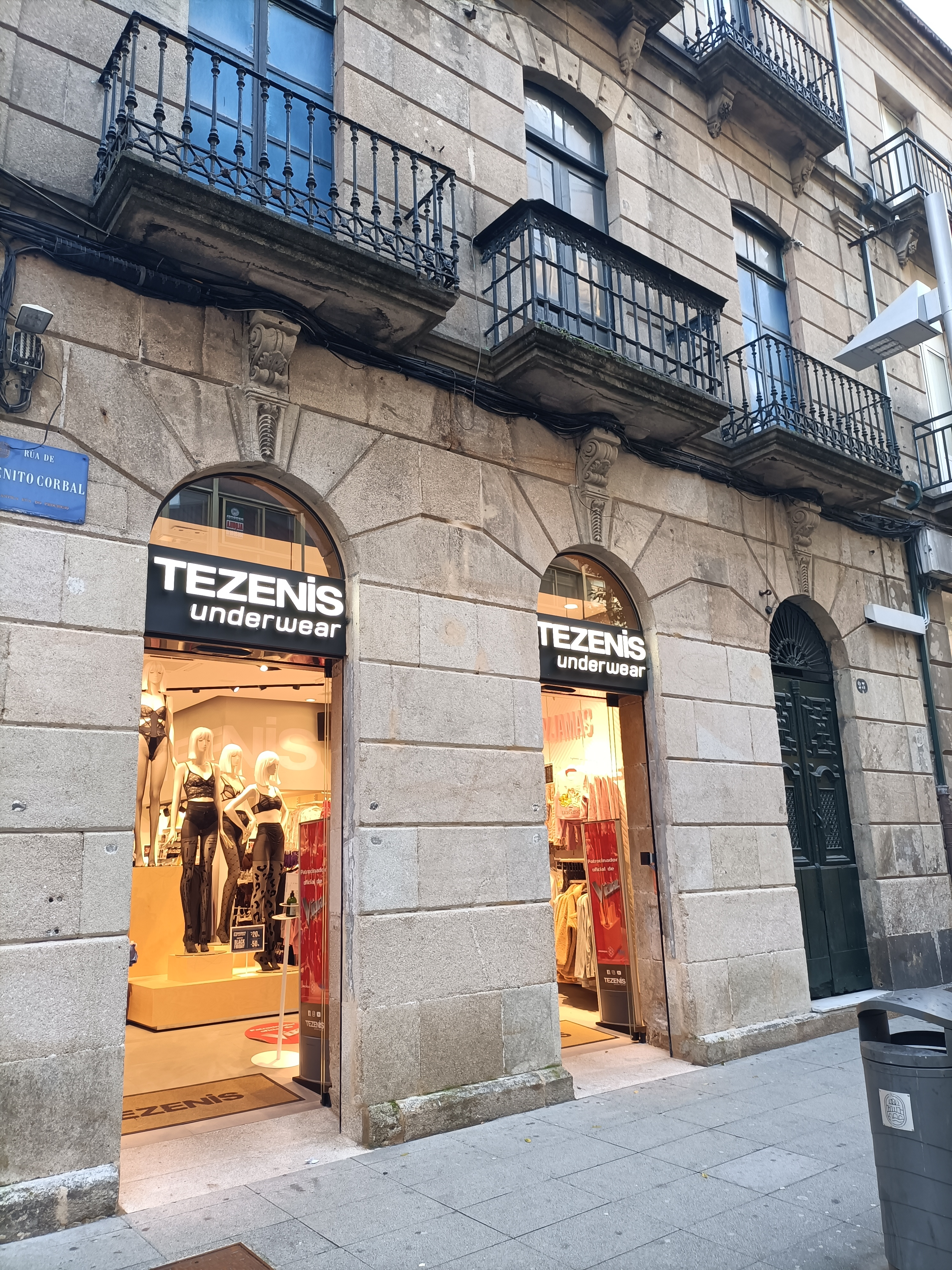

== See also ==
=== Bibliography ===
- Abelleira Doldán, Miguel (2016). La arquitectura en Galicia durante la autarquía: 1939-1953. Tomo I (PDF) (in Spanish). A Coruña: A Coruña University. p. 41;44 (chapter 3.4).
- Durán Villa, Francisco (2000). Provincia de Pontevedra (in Spanish). Madrid: Mediterráneo. p. 90; 96. ISBN 8471563371.
- Fontoira Surís, Rafael (2009). Pontevedra monumental (in Galician). Pontevedra: Diputación de Pontevedra. p. 528. ISBN 9788484573272.

=== Related articles ===
- Gran Garaje building
- Ensanche-City Centre
- Plaza de la Herrería

=== External links ===
- Benito Corbal Street in Pontevedra
