= Norwegian Federation of Craft Enterprises =

The Norwegian Federation of Craft Enterprises (Norwegian: NHO Håndverk) is an employers' organisation in Norway, organized under the national Confederation of Norwegian Enterprise.

It was established in 1993 under the name Håndverksbedriftenes Landsforening (HBL).

The current director is Merethe Sunde. Chairman of the board is Vibeke Giske.
