= Indonesian Employers Association =

Organization of Indonesia

Indonesian Employers Association (APINDO)
- Asosiasi Pengusaha Indonesia
- Abbreviation: APINDO
- Formation: January 31, 1952; 74 years ago
- Founder: Harlan Bekti
- Type: Non-governmental trade association
- Purpose: Policy advocacy
- Headquarters: Permata Kuningan, Jl. Kuningan Mulia Kav. 9C, Jakarta, Indonesia
- Coordinates: 6.212090°S 106.834040°E
- Region served: Indonesia
- Services: Business promotion, networking, policy reforms
- Key people: Shinta W. Kamdani
- Website: apindo.or.id/en

The Indonesian Employers' Association (APINDO) is the representative of business world established on January 31, 1952, under leadership of the National Board (DPN) located in Jakarta, Provincial Boards in 34 provinces and approximately 350 Cities/Regencies Boards all over Indonesia.

As the representative of business world, APINDO has its representation in Tripartite institution which consists of the Government, Employers and Unions. Further, several board members of APINDO are also appointed in National Tripartite Forum, The National Wage Council, and the Occupational, Safety, and Health Council.

At the beginning of its establishment, APINDO focused on Industrial Relations and Em and it's inevitably that the roles of APINDO have been becoming increasingly strategic to promote national interests. APINDO is nowadays, hence, focusing larger on various sectors, developing human resources and partnerships through launching APINDO's business units such as International Strategic Partnership Center (ISPC) and APINDO Training Center (ATC).

APINDO's advocacy for the global business world

APINDO's advocacy for the global business world and representing Indonesia is carried out actively, through APINDO's membership and participation in: - the International Organization of Employers (IOE) - ASEAN Confederation of Employers (ACE) - Confederation of Asia-Pacific Employers (CAPE).

APINDO Leadership 2023 – 2028

On June 23, Shinta W. Kamdani was appointed by acclamation as the Chairman of APINDO 2023 – 2028 period replaced Hariyadi B. Sukamdani. Shinta is the first female chairman of APINDO brought several work plans and 4 leading actions for APINDO.

APINDO Work Plans 2023 – 2028 these are: Strengthening Human Resources & Manpower, Empowering business actors, especially Small Medium Enterprises (SMEs), Enhancing investment by improving sectoral & cross-sectoral issues, Participation & advocacy for national strategic policies, strengthening organization for future leadership, empowerment to promote national interests, and Strengthening networks with stakeholders.

APINDO's Leading Action Programs 2023 – 2028 are: 1) Stunting Alleviation; 2) APINDO Economic Roadmap; 3) UMKM Merdeka Program; 4) Mainstreaming HR – IR Certification.

== History and Leadership of APINDO ==
Referring to the Articles of Association made by notary Radeen Meester Soewandi with Deed Number 62 dated January 31, 1952, APINDO was established with the name Indonesian Entrepreneurs' Socio-Economic Affairs Consultative Body (Badan Permusyawaratan Urusan Sosial-Ekonomi Pengusaha Indonesia, abbreviated as PUSPI).

In the 1st PUSPI National Conference, January 15 -16th 1982 in Yogyakarta, it was agreed that the word "Perkumpulan" was changed to "Perhimpunan" so that the name became the Association of Socio-Economic Affairs of Entrepreneurs throughout Indonesia with the abbreviation unchanged, namely PUSPI.

Then, at the 2nd PUSPI National Conference on January, 29 – 30th 1985 in Surabaya, PUSPI changed its name to The Indonesian Employers’ Association (APINDO) currently.

During Sofjan Wanandi leadership era as Chairman of APINDO 2003 – 2013 period, it marked a new paradigm for APINDO in which APINDO delivered more strategic and comprehensive services to APINDO members. Under Sofjan Wanandi's leadership, APINDO expanded its focus, not only dealing with employment issues, but also related sectors and other issues that impact to the business world's performance.

Sofjan Wanandi was elected as Chairman of APINDO at the IX National Conference in Jakarta in 2013, but he resigned in 2014 since he was appointed as the Chair of the Indonesian Vice President Jusuf Kalla's Expert Team.

APINDO's leadership as General Chair was continued by Hariyadi B. Sukamdani in the 2014 – 2018 and continued to 2018 – 2023 period.

At the 10th APINDO's National Conference (MUNAS)on June 14 – 15th 2023, Shinta W. Kamdani was appointed by acclamation as the Chairman of APINDO 2023 – 2028 period and become the first female chairman of APINDO.

== See also ==
- List of employer associations
- Indonesian Chamber of Commerce and Industry
