= Gran Garaje Building =

Art nouveau building in Pontevedra, Spain

Gran Garaje
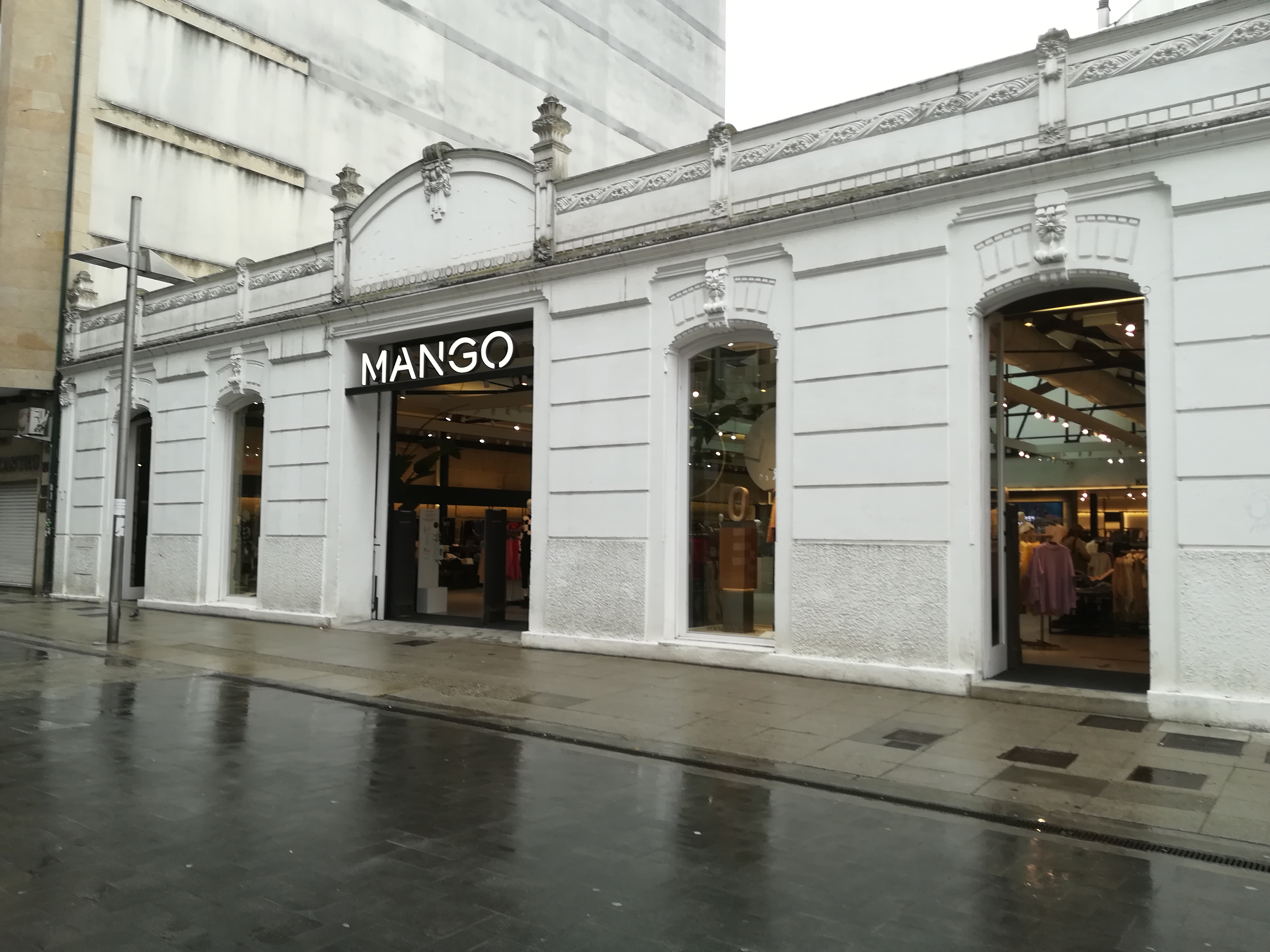
- The Gran Garaje façade
- Interactive map of the Gran Garaje area

General information
- Type: Garage
- Architectural style: Art Nouveau
- Location: Pontevedra, Galicia, Spain
- Coordinates: 42°25′50.3″N 8°38′33.3″W
- Completed: 1915
- Owner: Mango
- Management: Mango

Technical details
- Floor count: 1

Design and construction
- Architect: Maximiliano Limeses Artime

The Gran Garaje is an Art Nouveau building dating from 1915, located in the city centre of Pontevedra, Spain.

== Location ==
The building is located at Benito Corbal Street, in the pedestrian and commercial centre of the city, near Plaza de la Herrería in Pontevedra, Spain.

== History ==
The building was built in 1915 in the old Progreso street, according to a project by the architect Maximiliano Limeses Artime. It was built on a plot of land where there were some old garages. The building was built to serve as a stopping place for horse-drawn carriages.

In the 1960s, with the rise of the car in the city, its facade was renovated, the new roof was built and the building was renamed the Gran Garaje, serving as a paid car park with a capacity of 75 vehicles (hence its name). In the 1970s, the side entrance areas of the building were used as two small shops, one for souvenirs and the other for toys. In the 1980s, years of great real estate speculation in the city, it was saved from demolition for the construction of a multi-storey building when its sale was unsuccessful, leaving in view the dividing walls of the large buildings surrounding it.

In 2014, the car park and the two small shops at the entrance were permanently closed. After a complete renovation of the facade and the interior, the building was opened on 5 May 2017 as a fashion shop of the Mango clothing chain.

== Description ==
The building has an Art Nouveau facade and a large, spacious and diaphanous interior, due to the original function for which it was designed. It has an area of 900 square metres.

It is a single-storey building with a ground floor. The white facade has a large square wooden door recessed in the centre and two elongated low-arched doors on each side. The roof, listed and protected as a heritage feature, consists of a roof lantern, a trellis and a roof pitch dating from 1965.

The Art Nouveau decoration with floral motifs is centred above the four side doors. The upper frieze is abundantly decorated and the central part of the façade above the large entrance door is crowned by a circular pediment framed between two small columns, under which is the inscription in relief Gran Garaje.

== Gallery ==
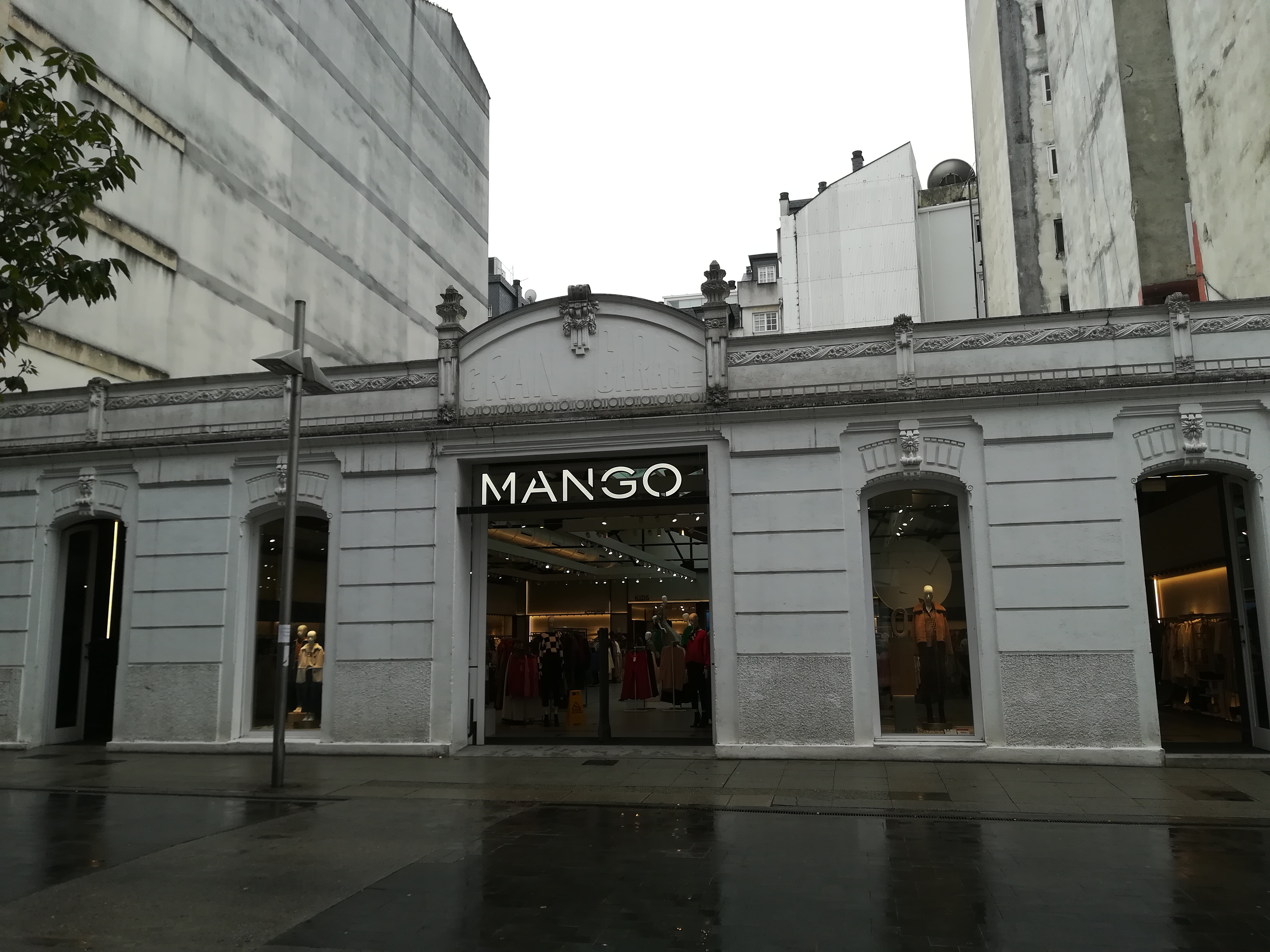
Façade

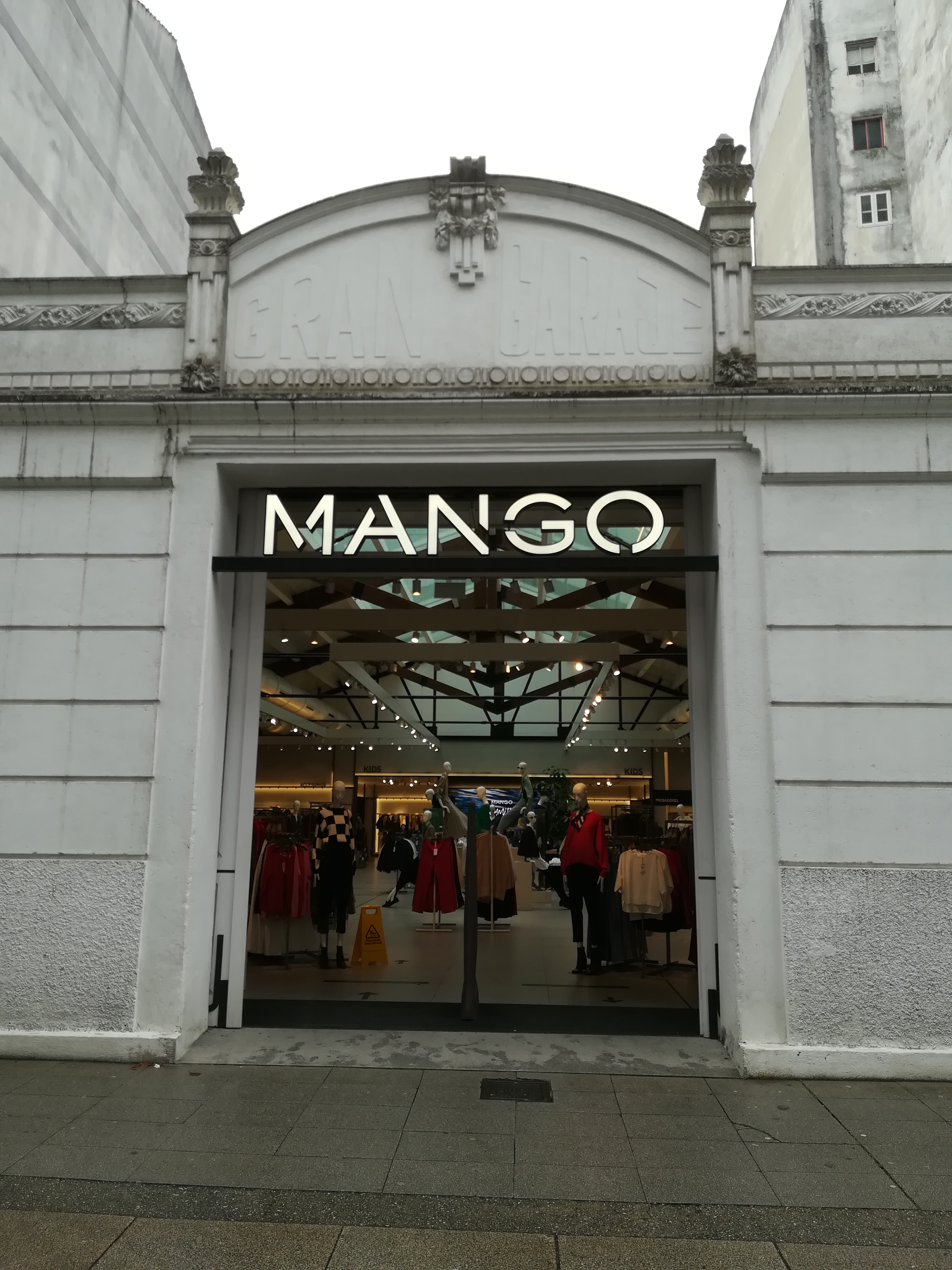
Entrance

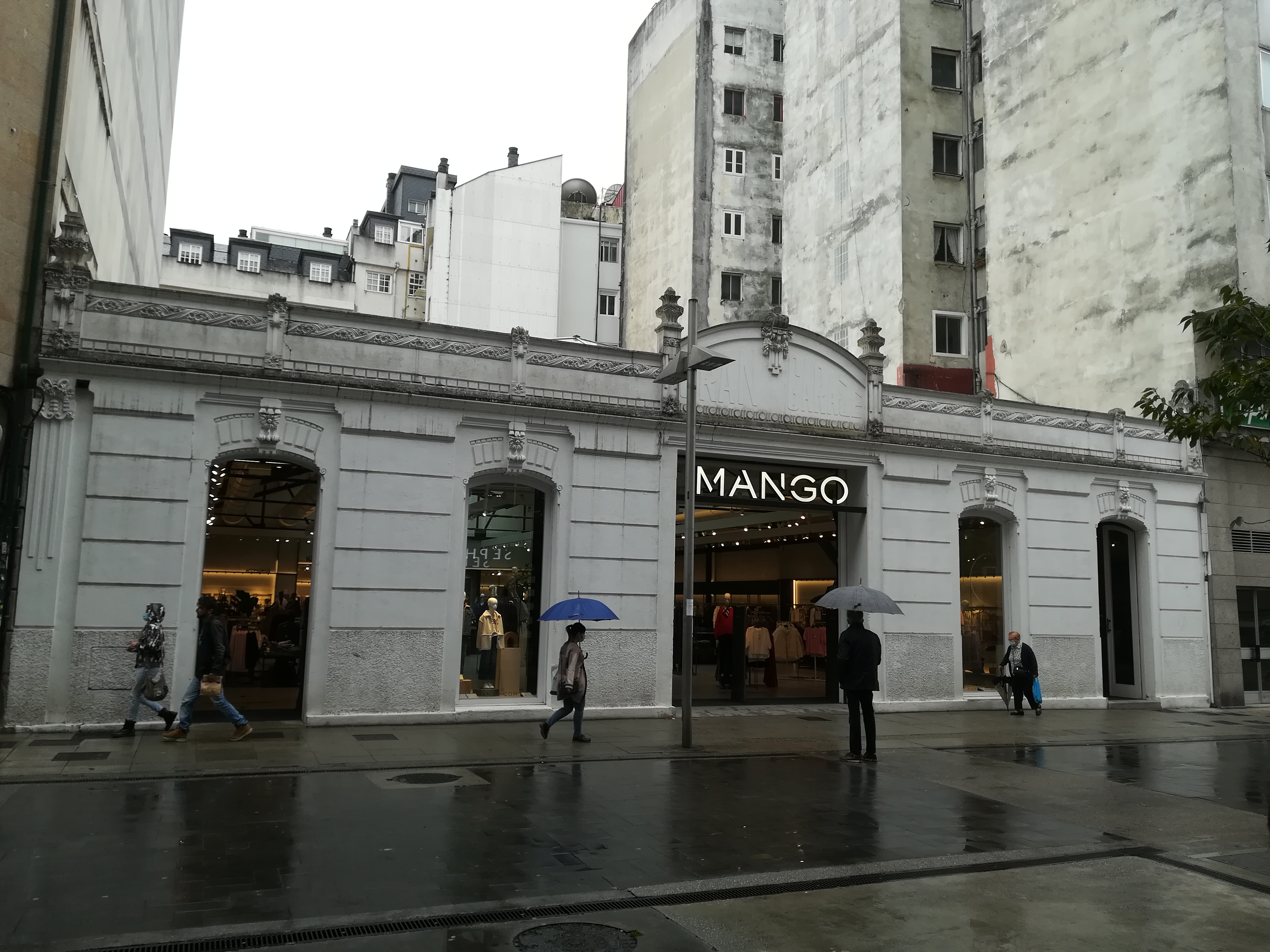
Façade and Mango shop

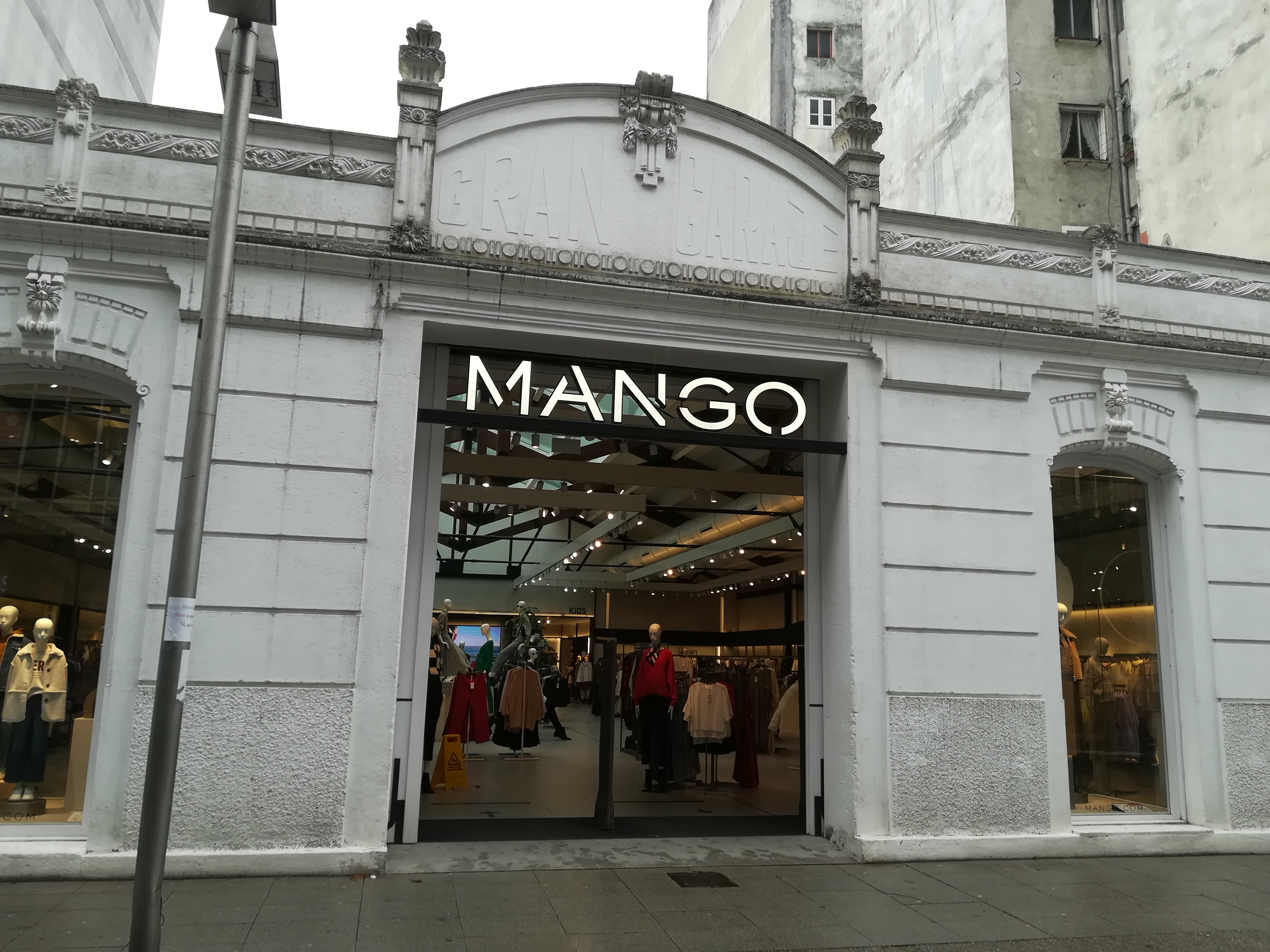
Central section

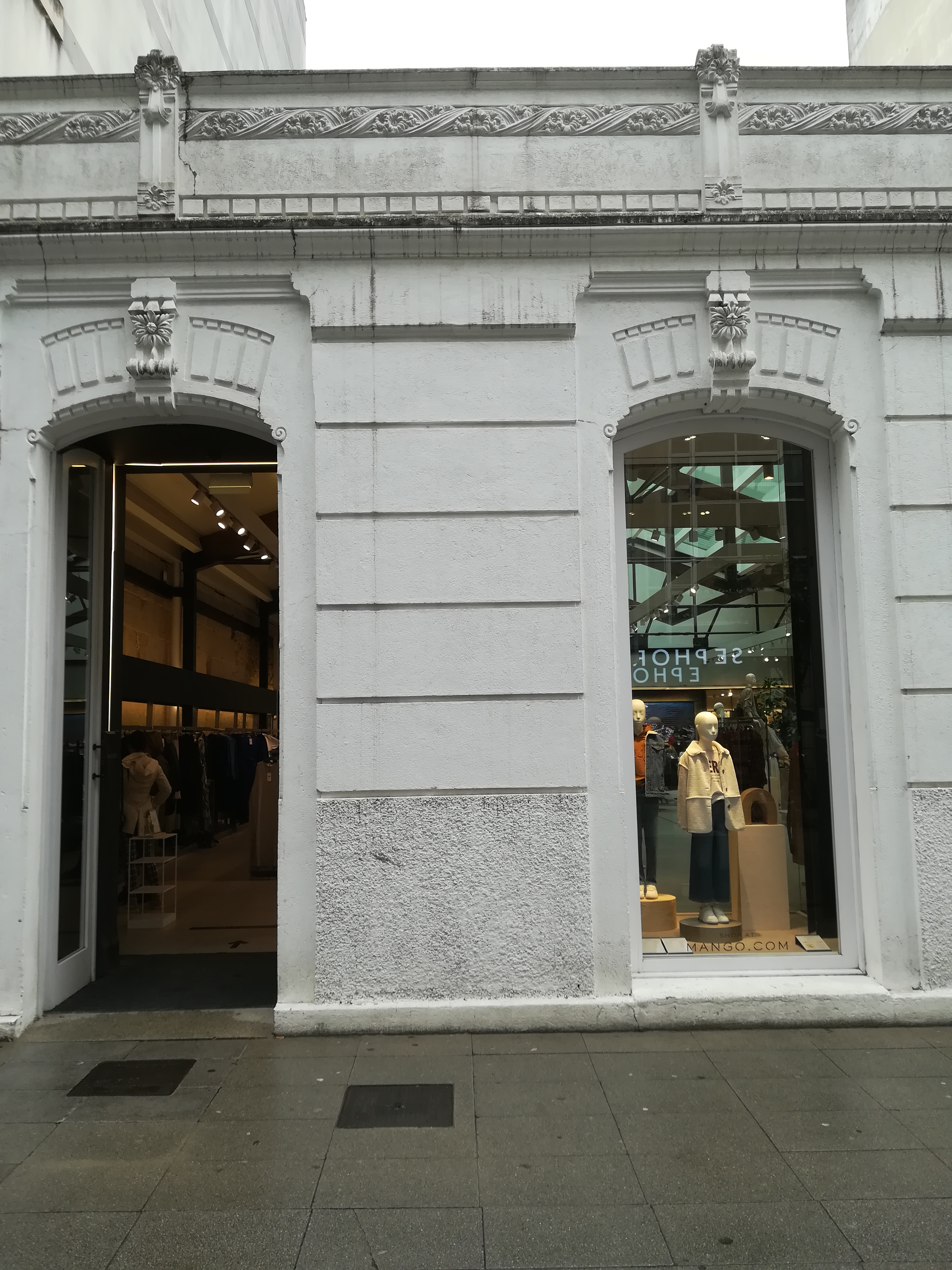
Left side doors

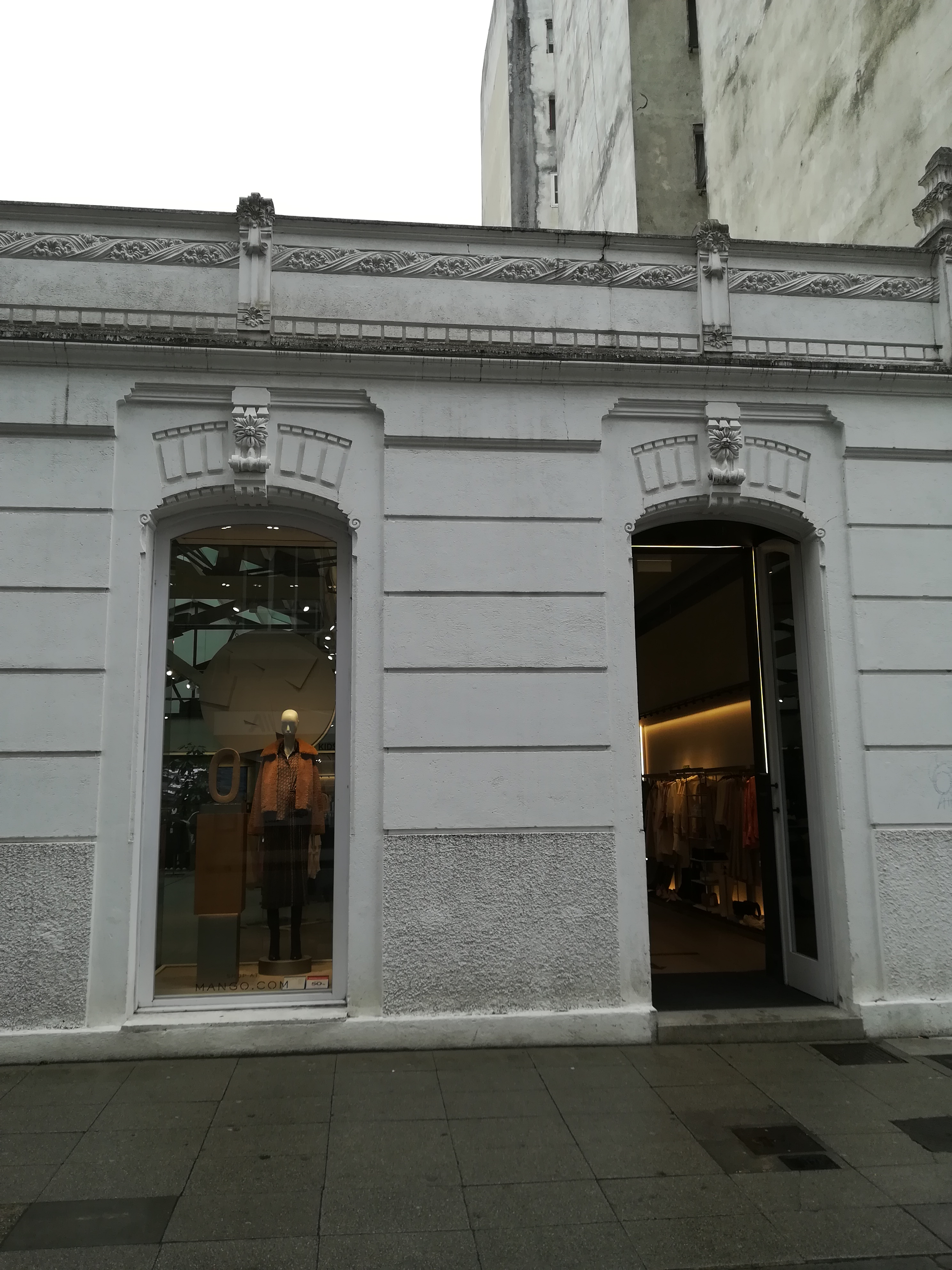
Right side doors

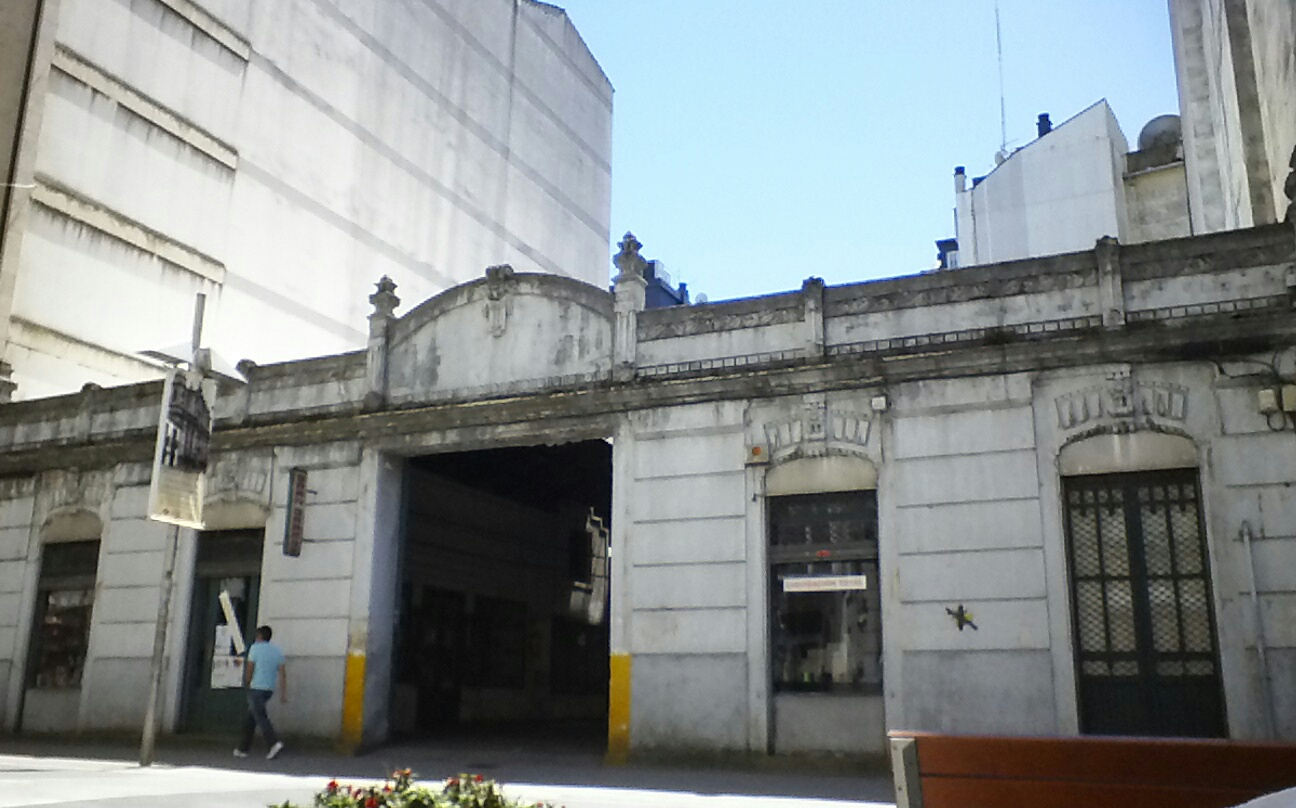
The Gran Garaje building in 2014 before its renovation

== See also ==
=== Related articles ===
- Calle Benito Corbal
- Art Nouveau
- Mango

=== External links ===
- Images of the Gran Garaje renovation
- Big fashion brands in historic buildings
