= Albania–Serbia relations =

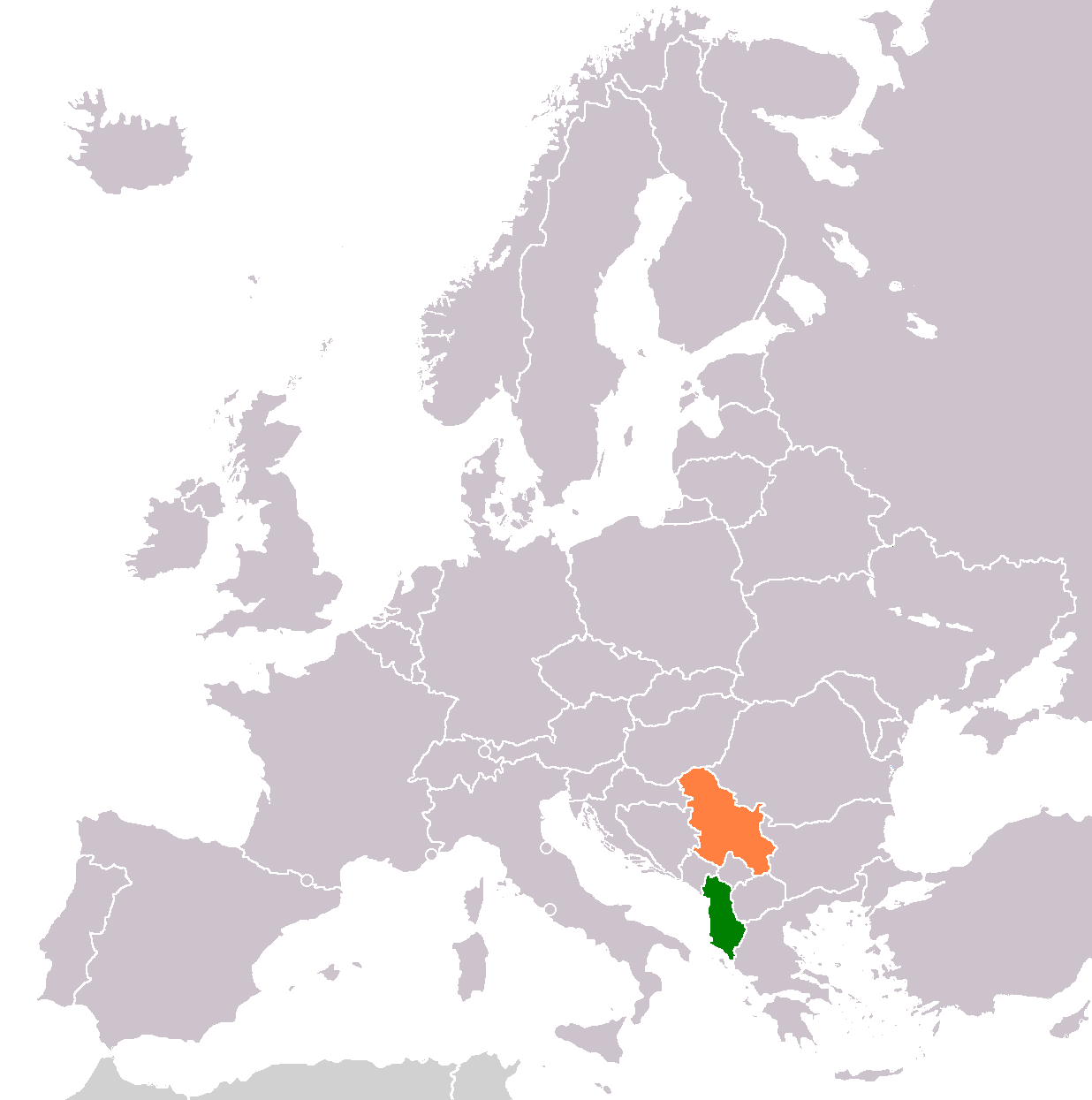
- Albania: Serbia

Albania and Serbia maintain diplomatic relations established in 1914. From 1918 to 2006, Albania maintained relations with the Kingdom of Yugoslavia, the Socialist Federal Republic of Yugoslavia (SFRY), and the Federal Republic of Yugoslavia (FRY) (later Serbia and Montenegro), of which Serbia is considered shared (SFRY) or sole (FRY) legal successor.

Relations between two countries have been complex and largely unfriendly due to a number of historical events.

== History ==
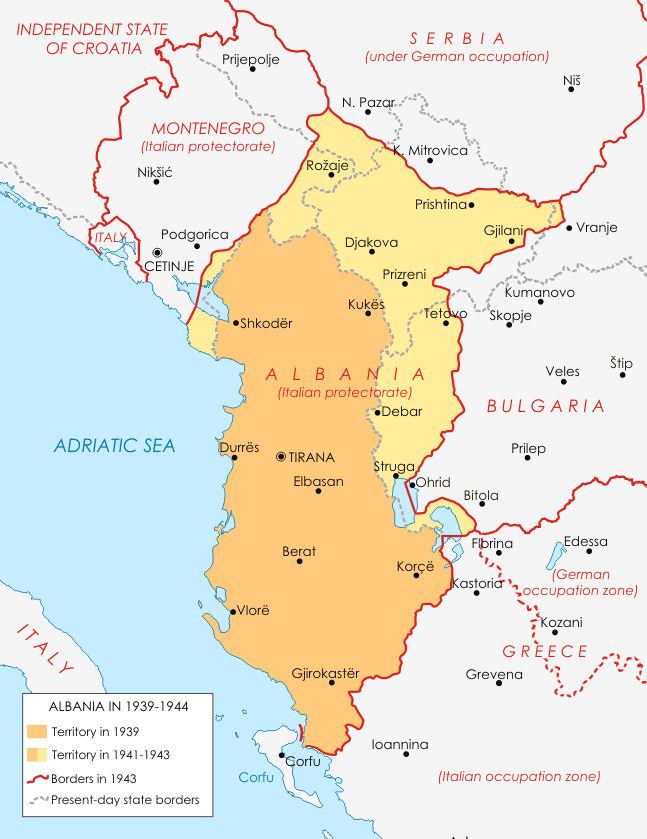
Albania with occupied parts of Yugoslavia in World War II

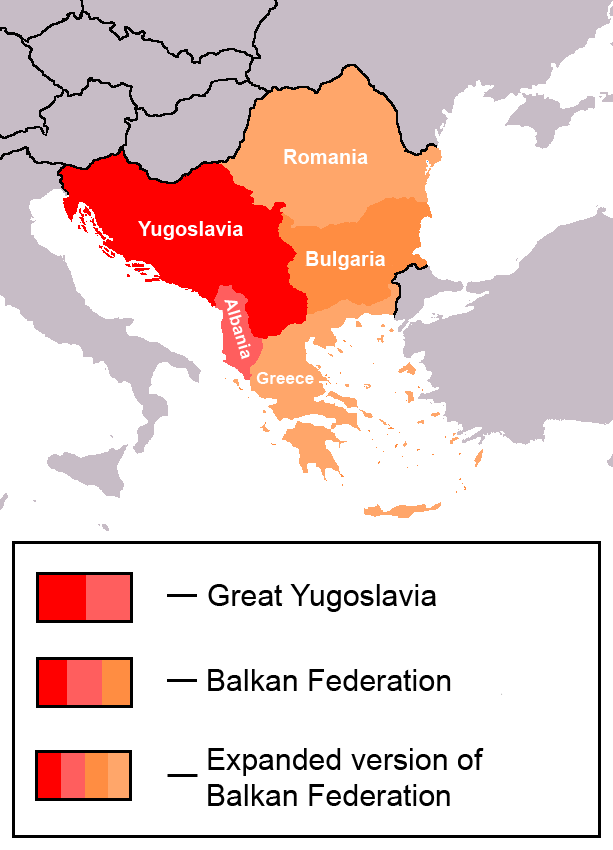
Proposed post-World War II project of the Balkan Federation

=== Ottoman period ===
In the late Ottoman period, Serbian diplomat Ilija Garašanin contacted the abbot of Mirdita, Monsignor Gasper Krasniqi, with the goal of acquiring the Albanian Catholic element as the alleged solution to the "Eastern Question". However, their goals were different. While Garašanin considered those contacts as means for the realization of a Serbian exit to the Adriatic Sea, Krasniqi made effort to help Serbia to organize a revolution of the Albanian Catholic community, primarily Mirdita, against the Turks, for the political freedom and independence of Albania.

=== Balkan Wars ===
At the beginning of Balkan Wars, one of the important strategic goals of Serbian politics was to acquire a corridor to the Adriatic Sea, as such, its intention had been to share a common border with its ally the Kingdom of Greece thus denying the Albanian state independent status. At the First Balkan War, Albanians fought for a national state. This fighting was largely limited, however, to militia operations and guerrilla tactics.

=== World War I ===
During the First World War, Albanian Prime Minister Essad Toptani signed the Treaty of Niš with Serbia. Albania would become a battleground, with the Serbian Army moving through the Albanian countryside during the Great Retreat.

=== World War II ===
During World War II, very close cooperation developed between the People's Liberation Army of Yugoslavia and the People's Liberation Army of Albania. The Albanian People's Army assumed power in the country in 1944. Democratic Federal Yugoslavia was the first country to recognize the new government of Albania in April 1945.

=== Cold War ===
There were communist plans to create a Balkan federation which would include Yugoslavia, Albania, Romania, Bulgaria, and Greece. However, after the resolution of Informbiro 1948, Albania broke relations with the Yugoslav communists, because Enver Hoxha remained loyal to the Soviet Union under Joseph Stalin.

=== Yugoslav Wars ===
As a result of the Kosovo War during 1998 and 1999, Albania supported NATO's bombing campaign against FR Yugoslavia which resulted in FR Yugoslavia breaking diplomatic relations with Albania.

== Political relations ==
Albanian Prime Minister Edi Rama visited Serbia and met with Serbian Prime Minister Aleksandar Vučić in 2014 for the first meeting of its type between the two countries' leadership since the 1947 meeting of Albanian dictator Enver Hoxha with President of Yugoslavia Josip Broz Tito. However, tempers flared when Rama said that Kosovo's independence was "undeniable" and "must be respected" and Vučić accused him of a "provocation".

In 2022 during the World Economic Forum in Davos, Serbia's Aleksandar Vučić remarked "the relations between Albania, Serbia, and North Macedonia have never been better.” Serbia promoted a joint economic and political zone between the three Western Balkan states, and asserted an “open-door policy” for anyone ready to cooperate. The Open Balkan is an economic and political zone of three member states in the Balkans, those being Albania, North Macedonia and Serbia.

== Economic relations ==
Trade between two countries amounted to $338 million in 2023; Serbia's merchandise exports to Albania were about $260 million; Albania's exports were standing at $78 million.

== Albanians in Serbia ==
Albanians in Serbia are a recognized ethnic minority group. They number 61,687, constituting 0.93% of the total population (excluding Kosovo). The vast majority of them live in the Preševo Valley, southernmost part of the country.

== Serbs in Albania ==
Serbs in Albania are a recognized ethnic minority group. They were concentrated in the region of Vraka, but largely emigrated in the 1990s. The community is bilingual and by majority adhere to Eastern Orthodoxy, while a minority professes Islam. According to the 2023 Census, 586 citizens of Albania declared themselves as Serbs.

== Resident diplomatic missions ==
- Albania has an embassy in Belgrade.
- Serbia has an embassy in Tirana.

== See also ==
- Foreign relations of Albania
- Foreign relations of Serbia
- Albania–Kosovo relations
- Kosovo–Serbia relations
- Albania–Yugoslavia relations
