= Albania–Slovenia relations =

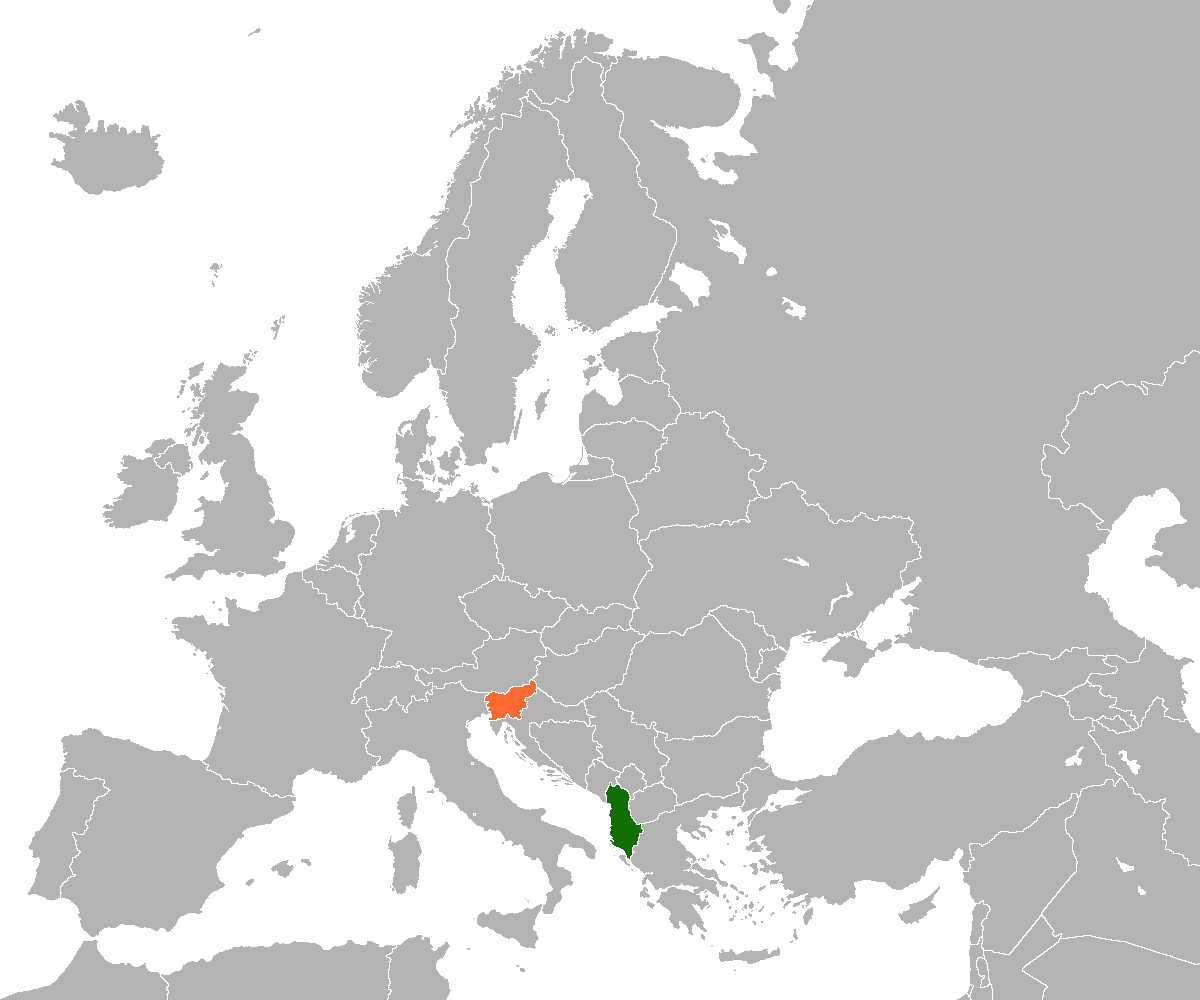

- Albania: Slovenia

Albania–Slovenia relations are diplomatic relations between the Republic of Albania and the Republic of Slovenia. Albania has an embassy in Ljubljana and Slovenia has an embassy in Tirana. Both countries established diplomatic relations on 9 March 1992.

Both countries are members of the North Atlantic Treaty Organization (NATO) and the Organization for Security and Co-operation in Europe. Furthermore, Slovenia is a member of the EU, while Albania is a EU candidate.

== Resident diplomatic missions ==
- Albania has an embassy in Ljubljana.
- Slovenia has an embassy in Tirana.

== See also ==
- Foreign relations of Albania
- Foreign relations of Slovenia
- Accession of Albania to the EU
- NATO-EU relations
- Albania–Yugoslavia relations
