= Coparmex =

Mexican employers' association

Coparmex or Confederación Patronal de la República Mexicana is the Mexican Employers' Association.

Current president (March 2020): Fernando Treviño Núñez,

The Employers Confederation of the Mexican Republic (COPARMEX) is a voluntary membership business organization, looking through representation in the workplace and society. Its more than 36,000 member companies across the country are responsible for 30% of GDP and 4.8 million formal jobs.

COPARMEX consists of a network of 65 business centers, 10 Federations, 3 Performances and 14 delegations in all states of the Republic. In addition, 28 national working committees dedicated to the study and creation of proposals on major issues of the economy and society.

== History of Coparmex ==
COPARMEX was founded on September 26, 1929, at the initiative of Luis G. Sada, a Monterrey industrialist who in Industrial Delegations Convention of the Confederation of National Chambers of Commerce and Industry released his idea of forming a separate organization to the Chambers established by law.

== Stated Mission ==
Contribute to the establishment of conditions for the prosperity of all Mexicans that promote increasing social cohesion, for companies to develop, multiply and do their job-creating role of wealth and social responsibility.

== See also ==
- Economy of Mexico
- Mexico
