= Fédération nationale des transporteurs routiers =

The Fédération nationale des transporteurs routiers (FNTR: in English, National Federation of Road Transport) is a French employers' association representing transport companies. Created in 1933, its goal is to defend and promote its members, including the long-term health of firms in the French trucking sector.
