= Employers' Federation of Hong Kong =

The Employers’ Federation of Hong Kong (EFHK) (Chinese: 香港僱主聯合會) is a non-profit organisation established to represent the interests of employers, in the wake of the growing economic activities in Hong Kong right after the Second World War. It is a member organisation of the Election Committee, the electoral college responsible for electing the Chief Executive of Hong Kong.

It was initially created in 1945 as a subcommittee of the Hong Kong General Chamber of Commerce, with which it still maintains strong links. Following the Chinese Engineers' Institute strike of 1947, it was spun off as a general union of employers under the Trade Unions Ordinance. The federation is represented at International Labour Organization meetings.

Its members employ more than 1 million workers and mainly come from the trading and distribution, and the professional and business services sectors. Members include AIA, PricewaterhouseCoopers, and the Hong Kong Jockey Club. It aims to both assist employers in various industries them in achieving harmonious labour relations, and also to lobby on labour-related public policies, although it very rarely engages in collective bargaining as its policy is to leave industrial negotiations to its individual members.
