= Albania–Yugoslavia relations =

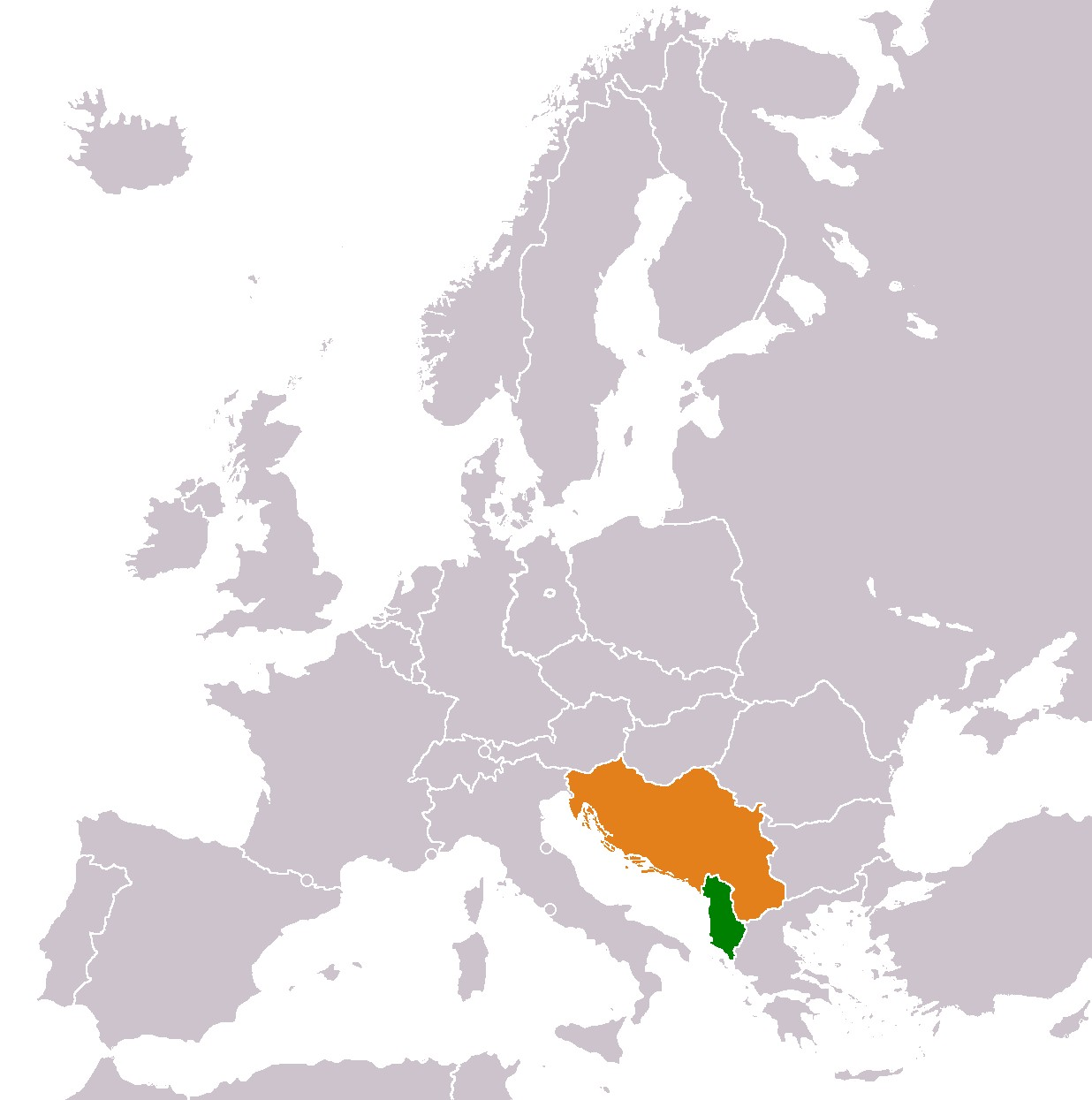

- Albania: Yugoslavia

Albania–Yugoslavia relations (Albanian: Marrëdhëniet Shqipëri-Jugosllavi; Serbo-Croatian: Albansko-jugoslavenski odnosi, Албанско-југословенски односи; Slovene: Odnosi med Albanijo in Jugoslavijo; Macedonian: Односите Албанија-Југославија) were historical foreign relations between Albania (both Kingdom of Albania 1928–1939 and the People's Socialist Republic of Albania 1946–1992) and now broken-up Yugoslavia (Kingdom of Yugoslavia 1918–1941 and Socialist Federal Republic of Yugoslavia 1945–1992). With occasional periods of friendly relations or efforts to improve relations, the two countries predominantly maintained cold or openly hostile relations. The period of close relations developed right after the end of World War II when Yugoslavia pushed for socioeconomic integration of Albania into Yugoslavia within the proposed Balkan Federation (bargaining with the idea of unification of Albania with kinship region of Kosovo); however, the two countries turned to sharp antagonism after the 1948 Tito–Stalin split.

== History ==
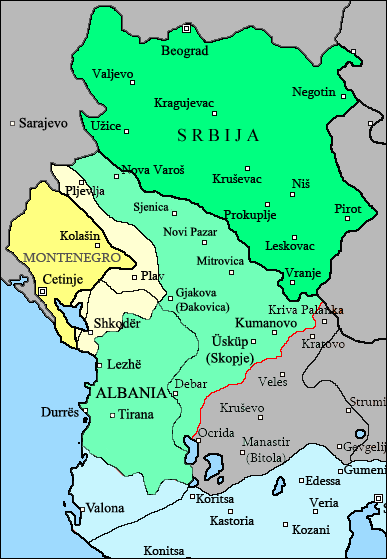
Spheres of Conquest in Ottoman Balkans during the First Balkan War.

Albanian early relations with Yugoslavia were preceded by its prior relations with the Kingdom of Serbia and the Kingdom of Montenegro and the experience of the dissolution of the Ottoman Empire in the Balkans. Predominantly Eastern Orthodox Balkan nations gained their independence a couple of decades before Albania so that the Albanian National Awakening was faced with state-building and regional balance of power games fueled by conflicting nationalist claims. This situation reached it peak at the time of the First Balkan War in which regional powers of Kingdom of Bulgaria, Kingdom of Serbia, Kingdom of Greece and Kingdom of Montenegro divided among themselves the remaining European territory of the sick man of Europe. While their earlier efforts were fueled with the intention of national liberation, during the First Balkan War regional balance of power played more prominent role in decision making so that Albanian territories were divided by its neighbors. At the same time the Albanian state started to develop, and due to the concern of the Great Powers over the Russian expansion into the Mediterranean the independent Principality of Albania was created along the coast. This state however did not include the Albanian-inhabited region of Kosovo as well as numerous Albanian populations in modern-day North Macedonia, Montenegro and Greece. The border remained unclear all through World War I (when the Serbian Albanian Golgotha took place) and in early years after the establishment of the Kingdom of Yugoslavia (which was created after Serbia united with Montenegro, Banat, Bačka and Baranja and the State of Slovenes, Croats and Serbs). Subsequent to 1948 Yugoslavia developed a comparatively open Titoist system economically linked to Western Europe and diplomatically active with non-bloc countries. Albania was on the other hand a highly self-isolated autarkic state, especially following the Soviet–Albanian split and Sino-Albanian split.

=== Kingdom of Yugoslavia relations with Albania ===
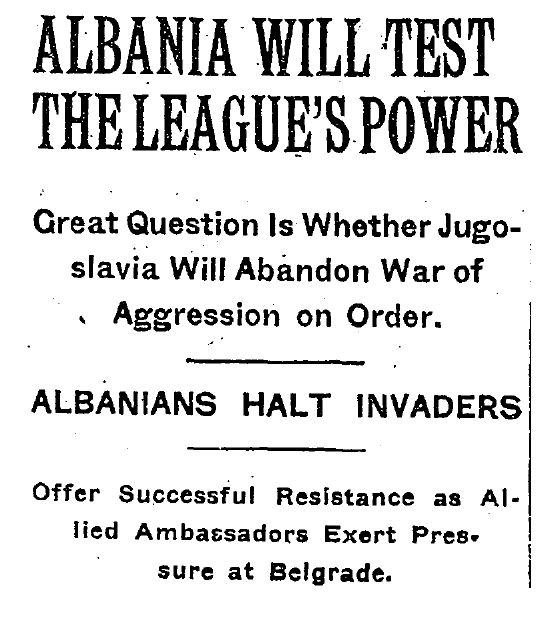
A New York Times headline from 9 November 1921 about the Yugoslav incursion in Albania.

In 1921 the Kingdom of Yugoslavia supported the establishment of the Republic of Mirdita in its efforts to push for more advantageous border demarcation for Yugoslavia. The Conference of Ambassadors decided to deal with the issue of Albanian-Yugoslav border and it published them soon after the creation of Republic of Mirdita yet the United Kingdom insisted on slight adaptations in the region of Debar, Prizren and Kastrati in the interest of Yugoslavia. In an effort to gain the favor of the Border Demarcation Commission the two countries established formal diplomatic relations in March 1922.

In 1927, Jurašković, a Yugoslavian interpreter at the Yugoslav Legation, was arrested on a charge of espionage and conspiracy against the Albanian Government. During the search of his house some documents were found that proved the accusations. The Yugoslav government demanded the release of Jurašković in an inappropriate tone, which angered the Albanian government. In his report, the correspondent of Daily Telegraph assesses that "tempers have been lost on both sides". Consequently, six months of tension followed. In the end, the Yugoslav consuls at Vlora, Shkodër, and Korçë were instructed by their government to leave Albania. The rupture of diplomatic relations between Yugoslavia and Albania occurred. The European powers proposed a solution that was accepted by both the Albanian and Yugoslav governments.

=== World War II ===
During World War II the Italian protectorate of Albania and subsequent German occupation of Albania created an effective Axis client state of Greater Albania which covered parts of Yugoslavia and persecuted the local non-Albanian population. National Liberation Movement of Albania closely cooperated and was significantly influenced by the Yugoslav Partisans.

=== Relations after World War II ===
Following the end of World War II Yugoslavia was reorganized as a socialist federation of six constituent federal subject republics. In addition, within the Socialist Republic of Serbia two autonomous regions were created one of which was the Autonomous Region of Kosovo and Metohija with ethnic Albanian majority. In July 1946, Yugoslavia and Albania signed the Treaty of Friendship and Cooperation followed by a series of technical and economic agreements aimed at integration of the Albanian and Yugoslav economies. Serbo-Croatian became a required subject in Albanian high schools at that time. At the Party of Labour of Albania plenum in February and March 1948 leadership voted to merge the Albanian and Yugoslav economies and militaries while Koçi Xoxe proposed appealing to Belgrade to admit Albania as a seventh Yugoslav republic.

Initially after Albania's liberation from Nazi occupation, Yugoslav advisors were extensively involved in Albanian affairs. Joseph Stalin supported Yugoslav influence in Albania, but became concerned with Josip Broz Tito's ambition in the region. Hoxha expressed strong support for Stalin. Relations between Albania and Yugoslavia turned into sharp antagonism after the 1948 Tito–Stalin split. Hoxha contended that Tito's style of socialism was corrupt and that Tito planned to annex Albania. Representations were upgraded back to the embassy level by an agreement reached on 5 February 1971.

== See also ==
- Soviet–Albanian split
- Albania–Bosnia and Herzegovina relations
- Albania–Croatia relations
- Albania–Montenegro relations
- Albania–North Macedonia relations
- Albania–Serbia relations
- Albania–Slovenia relations
- Ramiz Sadiku and Boro Vukmirović
- Kosovo War
- Death and state funeral of Josip Broz Tito
- Albania–Yugoslav border incident (April 1999)

== Works cited ==
- Anonymous (8 June 1927a). "Jugoslavia and Albania". The Daily Telegraph. p. 8.
- Anonymous (15 June 1927b). "Serbia and Albania". The Daily Telegraph. p. 12.
- Anonymous (27 June 1927c). "The League or the "Powers"". The Daily Herald. p. 5.
