= Konfindustria =

- Confederation of Industries of Albania
- Konfederata e Industrive të Shqipërisë
- Formation: 16 March 2007 (19 years ago)
- Headquarters: Rruga Qemal Stafa, Kullat Conad, Kati VII, Ap 7.1 (ish Profarma)
- Location: Tirana, Albania
- Administrator General: Gjergj Buxhuku
- Website: konfindustria.al

The Confederation of Industries of Albania – Konfindustria (Albanian: Konfederata e Industrive të Shqipërisë) is a legally registered non-government entity that groups and represents the interests of the manufacturing and service industries in Albania.

== Overview ==
Konfindustria was registered as a legal entity based on decision no. 1925 dated 16.3.2007 of the Tirana District Court. Its members are the most important representatives of Albanian industries across main sectors such as: energy, industry of exploration (mines, minerals, metal excretion), petroleum research, utilization and processing industry, agro-food industry, beverages industry, medical and cosmetic products industry, wood and furniture processing industry, telecommunication, tourism and services, etc.

In the Confederation of Industries of Albania any registered subject or legal organization has the right to become a member, provided that it belongs to the field of production or service providers and that it accepts the statute of the association, pays its membership quota and receives approval from the Governing Council.
