= Employers' organization =

Group of business leaders, usually in contrast with trade unions

An employers' organization or employers' association is a collective organization of manufacturers, retailers, or other employers of wage labor. Employers' organizations seek to coordinate the behavior of their member companies in matters of mutual interest, such as during negotiations with trade unions or government bodies. Employers' organizations operate like trade unions and promote the economic and social interests of its member organizations.

== History ==
In a free market the rivalry between competing companies naturally tends to preclude combined action for the advancement of common interests. The emergence of trade unions and their efforts to establish collective bargaining agreements on a local or an industry-wide level ultimately paved the way for combined action by competitors employing such labor in common.

The collective entities established by commercial enterprises acting in concert on such matters are known variously as employers' organizations or employers' associations.

Historically, employers' associations were of two general types: those consisting only of employers in a single trade or industry, or those bringing together employers from across a broad spectrum of industries on a local, regional, or national basis.

As was the case for unions, the first employers' organizations emerged in large industrial cities during the first half of the 19th century. Both unions and employers' organizations tended to be localized. As unions began to proliferate and to gain strength in negotiations over wages and conditions through the use of strike actions, employers began to unite in order to restrict wage rates and otherwise fetter the emerging organized labor movement.

== International variations ==
The role and position of an employers' organization differs from country to country. In countries with an Anglo-Saxon economic system (such as the United Kingdom and the United States), where there is no institutionalized cooperation between employers' organizations, trade unions and government, an employers' organization is an interest group or advocacy group that through lobbying tries to influence government policy. In these countries, employers' organizations tend to be weaker, with many of their functions taken over by industry trade groups, which are basically public relations organizations.

In countries with a social market economy, such as Austria, Sweden, Norway and the Netherlands, the employers' organizations are part of a system of institutionalized deliberation, together with government and the trade unions. In tri-partite bargaining the so-called social partners strike agreements on issues like price levels, wage increases, tax rates and pension entitlements. In these countries collective bargaining is often done not between one corporation and one union, but between national employers' organizations and national trade unions.

In countries like Switzerland, the negotiations often take place at the cantonal level, branch by branch. The state is not involved in these negotiations, but can step in if the employers and the trade unions don't reach an agreement in a sector where salary dumping exists.

== See also ==
- Chamber of commerce
- List of employer associations
- Federation of International Employers
- Labor relations
