= Federation of International Employers =

Employers Organisation

The Federation of International Employers (FedEE Global)
- Company type: Company limited by guarantee
- Traded as: FedEE Global
- Industry: Employers organisation
- Predecessor: Federation of European Employers
- Founded: 1988
- Founder: Robin E.J Chater (Secretary-General)
- Headquarters: London, Nicosia and Hong Kong, United Kingdom, Cyprus and Hong Kong
- Number of locations: 3
- Area served: Global
- Services: Information, analysis, advice, publications and training for multinational companies
- Website: http://www.fedee.com/

The Federation of International Employers / La Federación de Empresarios Internacionales (formerly The Federation of European Employers) was established in 1988 with the support of the European Commission. Today it operates independently and claims to be the leading organisation for multinational employers. It is also known as FedEE Global.

The Federation's principal aims are to assist companies to achieve legal compliance, operate more effectively at an international level, improve transnational HR capabilities, network with other international executives, develop practical/equitable pay structures, evaluate new employment methods and trends, monitor employee participation and trade union activities and embrace workforce diversity.

== History ==
In 1988, the organisation was founded as the Federation of European Employers by current Secretary-General Robin E.J Chater in order to assist human resource professionals operating in Europe.

The head office is located in London, UK - but due to the Brexit vote in 2016 as a global organization the organization changed its operational headquarters to Nicosia, Cyprus and Hong Kong. As a further development in 2014, the Federation became the principal sponsor of a new business networking community called butN. The butN system allows business travelers to link up and meet face-to-face.

The Federation operates in 70 countries. It does not give any information about the current number of its members. It has fifty five employees, including the Founder and Secretary-General, Robin Chater. It has 175 followers on LinkedIn.

== Work of the Federation ==
In addition to providing legal/HR information, updates and advice, the Federation offers a one-year Advanced Diploma in Multinational Employment Law (Adv.Dip MELL) that also entitles the holder to use the designation "HR Counsel" after their name (protected by international trademark).

Areas of changes monitored by the Federation include: union developments (changes in structure, membership, campaigns, protests and strike activity); evolution and operation of works councils; pay and benefit trends and new elements in collective agreements; remuneration; corporate governance rules and corporate ethics; income tax; health and safety; working time and leave; privacy at work; employee recruitment; work and residence permits; pensions and social security; financial participation plans; business transfers; termination of employment contracts; discrimination and equal opportunity.

As an employers’ organisation, the Federation also acts as a think tank in a wide range of employment-related fields.
