= Harun Beka =

Kosovo Liberation Army soldier

- Born: 3 June 1951; Gushac, Mitrovicë, SFR Yugoslavia (today Kosovo)
- Died: 11 April 1999 (aged 47); Koshare, Gjakovë, FR Yugoslavia (today Kosovo)
- Military career
- Allegiance: Kosova
- Branch: Kosovo Liberation Army
- Service years: 1998–1999
- Conflicts: Kosovo War: Battle of Kosharë †
- Awards: Hero of Kosovo (posthumously)

Harun Beka (3 July 1951 – 11 April 1999) was a prominent Albanian nationalist, activist, and soldier of the Kosovo Liberation Army, who became famous for his assassination attempt on a Yugoslav ambassador, and was later killed in the Battle of Kosharë.

== Early life ==
Harun Beka was born on June 3, 1951, in a poor Albanian family in Gushac, Mitrovicë. He was one of twelve children who grew up in poverty. His early years were shaped by the stories of hardship faced by the Albanian people during the oppressive regime of Aleksandar Ranković, particularly the mass displacement of Albanians to Turkey, as recounted by his father.

He completed his primary and secondary education in Mitrovicë. In 1972, after completing a geology qualification in Ljubljana, Slovenia he moved to Germany in search of better opportunities. While in Germany, he became deeply involved in the Albanian diaspora's political activities, especially following the 1981 protests in Kosovo, which called for greater rights for Albanians in Yugoslavia.

== Political career ==
=== Early activism ===
In Germany Beka became acquainted with Kadri Zeka, a key figure in the Albanian nationalist movement, who later would be assassinated along with the brothers Jusuf Gërvalla Bardhosh Gërvalla, in a small town near Stuttgart, by members of the Yugoslav secret service. Zeka's influence left a lasting impression on Beka, leading him to dedicate his life to the defense of Albanian national interests. Beka participated in numerous demonstrations organized by the Albanian diaspora across Europe, supporting the cause of Albanians in and outside Kosovo.

=== Assassination attempt ===
In 1983, during a Yugoslav government-organized event in Sundern, Germany, in which an Albanian-speaking Yugoslav diplomat aimed to portray the Yugoslav state as democratic and the life of Albanians in Freedom, Beka interrupted the proceedings by protesting against the treatment of Albanians. In the chaos that ensued, he fired a revolver in the direction of the Yugoslav consular officials, an act that led to his arrest. Following an investigation, Beka was released, with political motives recognized for his actions. Despite Yugoslavia's demands for his extradition, Germany granted him political asylum.

=== Late political advocacy ===
Throughout the 1980s and 1990s, Beka remained an active figure in the Albanian nationalist movement. He maintained close ties with Albania, particularly through its embassies, and collaborated with several diplomats from the Socialist Republic of Albania. He was also an active member of the "Emin Duraku" Albanian Club in Düsseldorf, which played a significant role in organizing the Albanian diaspora against Yugoslavia.

In addition to his activism, Harun joined the Kosovo Committee for the Information of World Opinion, an organization that played a critical role in internationalizing the Kosovo issue. Through this committee, he worked tirelessly to inform the global community about the violations of human rights and the political situation faced by Kosovo Albanians.

Harun Beka was also instrumental in the founding of the Revolutionary Organization of Albanians, a group that would later evolve into the Revolutionary Party of Albanians (Partia Revolucionare Shqiptare). The party was established to unite and organize Albanians around revolutionary ideals and the armed struggle for Kosovo's independence. Harun held key leadership positions within the party, actively directing its political and military activities.

== Military career ==
=== Supporting the armed resistance ===
With the rise of armed resistance against Serbian forces, Beka eagerly supported the Kosovo Liberation Army. He believed that only through armed struggle could Kosovo achieve its independence. By the late 1990s, Beka was actively involved in organizing and supplying the KLA, particularly from their bases in Albania.

=== Joining the KLA ===
Harun Beka's determination to join the Kosovo Liberation Army began in the spring of 1998 when he repeatedly requested to enlist in its ranks. Initially, his request was denied, but his persistence never wavered, raising the topic at every opportunity. By the summer of 1998, an attempt to enter Kosovo failed due to communication issues, delaying his involvement. However, in the Winter of 1998, Harun finally joined fellow volunteers on the front lines of the Koshare region.

== Death ==
On April 11, 1999, during intense fighting in Košare, Harun Beka lost his life alongside notable KLA commander Agim Ramadani. This operation was pivotal as it marked the first time the border between Albania and Kosovo was breached, symbolizing a significant victory for the KLA in their fight for Kosovo's independence. Beka's death, though a profound loss for his comrades and the movement, further solidified his legacy amongst Kosovar Albanians as a committed fighter who gave his life for Kosovo. His name has become a symbol of dedication to the cause of Kosovo independence.

== Legacy ==
His commitment to the national cause remained unwavering until his death on the battlefield, marking him as one of the most prominent figures in the KLA. After the war he was rewarded with title "Hero of Kosovo." Additionally the primary school in Gushac bears his name and a statue of him was placed in a major street of his hometown Mitrovicë.
