= Sali Çekaj =

Kosovo Liberation Army leader (1956–1999)

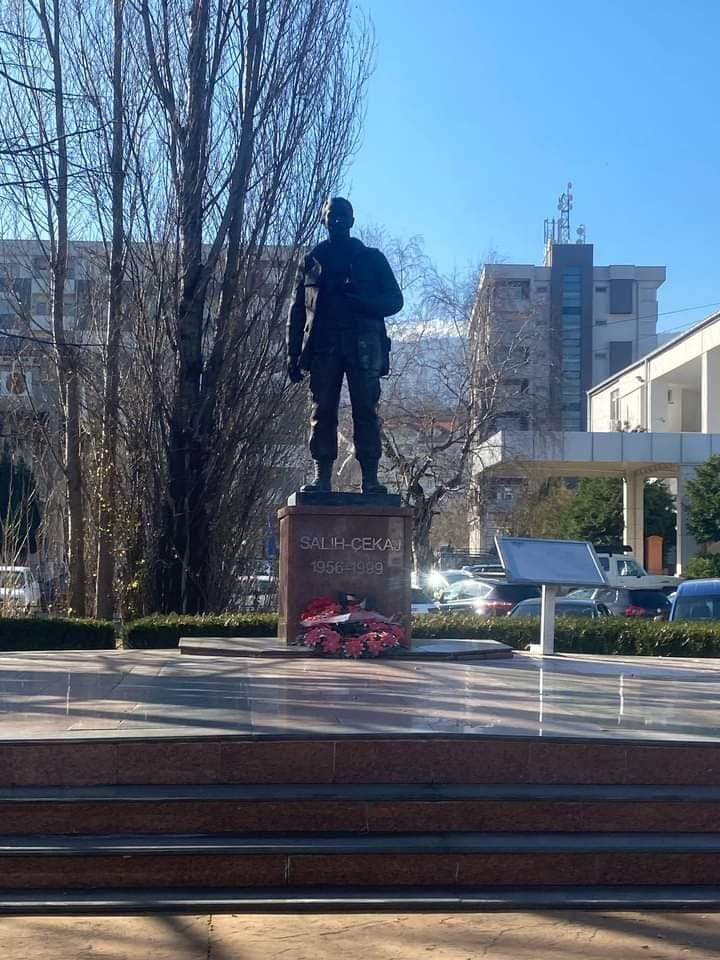
- Born: 22 June 1956; Broliq, Deçan, FPR Yugoslavia (today Kosovo)
- Died: 19 April 1999 (aged 42); Koshare, Gjakovë, FR Yugoslavia (today Kosovo)
- Military career
- Allegiance: Kosova
- Branch: Armed Forces of the Republic of Kosova; Kosovo Liberation Army
- Service years: 1991–1999
- Rank: Commander
- Nickname: Kommandant Veterani
- Conflicts: Insurgency in Kosovo (1995–98) Kosovo War: Battle of Loxha; Battle of Kosharë †
- Awards: Hero of Kosovo (posthumously)

Sali Çekaj (22 June 1956 – 19 April 1999) was a Kosovo Albanian political activist and commander of the Armed Forces of the Republic of Kosovo (FARK) and of the Kosovo Liberation Army (KLA) who was killed during the Battle of Kosharë.

== Early life ==
Sali Çekaj was born on 22 June 1956, in the village of Broliq, Deçan. Raised in a family that valued patriotism, he pursued legal studies and graduated as a lawyer. His early legal career involved political activism, where he advocated for the rights of Albanians under Serbian administration.

== Political activism ==
Çekaj's political activism began in the 1980s during the mass demonstrations in Kosovo in 1981. He was a vocal opponent of the oppressive policies of the Yugoslav government and became a key leader in his community. By the early 1990s, he played a significant role in organizing protests in support of the Trepça miners' strike and mobilizing resistance against Serbian rule.

Sali Çekaj was one of the primary contributors to the drafting of the Kaçanik Constitution in 1990, which aimed to assert Kosovo's autonomy. He worked closely with fellow activists to establish a communal statute for the Deçan municipality, making it one of the few areas with its own governing framework in defiance of Serbian laws. His unwavering commitment to the cause led to an arrest warrant issued by Serbian authorities, forcing him to flee to Germany in 1991.

== Military career ==
=== Founding the Armed Resistance ===
After moving to Germany, Çekaj continued his political activism and became involved in organizing the Albanian diaspora for military resistance. He was one of the first to initiate military training for young volunteers in Albania during the early 1990s. Alongside later prominent figures such as Adem Jashari, Zahir Pajaziti or Ilaz Kodra, he led a group of 34 men, who crossed into Albania to undergo military training, facilitated with the knowledge and support of Albanian President Ramiz Alia. Çekaj established several training centers in Albania, including those in Tropojë, and helped organize the armed guerilla tactics that would later be used in Kosovo.

=== Formal dissolution of FARK and joining the KLA ===
By 1998, with the Kosovo War intensifying, Çekaj became deeply involved with the Armed Forces of the Republic of Kosovo (FARK), where he played a leading role in organizing military brigades in Dukagjin. He coordinated closely with Tahir Zemaj, setting up three operational brigades. These units would go on to participate in numerous battles, including the Battle of Loxha.

On 21 June 1998, after the Oslo Agreement, Commander Çekaj and Major Tahir Zemaj, along with hundreds of soldiers and military officers of the FARK, took an oath in the presence of Defense Minister Ahmet Krasniqi, which ended in the formal dissolution of the FARK and integration into the KLA.

== Death ==
On 19 April 1999, Sali Çekaj was killed while fighting in the Battle of Kosharë, a significant confrontation between the Kosovo Liberation Army and Yugoslav forces. Çekaj, along with famous commanders like Agim Ramadani and soldiers like Harun Beka, played a key role in the battle, which became one of the most notable military engagements during the conflict. His death occurred amidst intense fighting aimed at securing the area and advancing the KLA's objectives.

== Legacy ==
Çekaj's involvement in key military operations, including the Battle of Kosharë and his efforts in organizing armed resistance and his leadership within the KLA are acknowledged as part of the broader struggle for Kosovo's independence.

Sali Çekaj is recognized as a notable figure in the history of the Kosovo Liberation Army. His roles as a political activist, lawyer, and military commander contributed to the organizational and operational efforts of the KLA were posthumously honored with the title "Hero of Kosovo" and a statue of him was placed in a major place of his hometown Deçan.
