= Anton Quni =

Kosovar politician and military commander

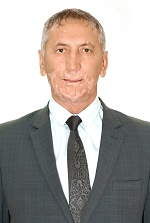

Minister of Defense of Kosovo
- In office 3 February 2020 – 22 March 2021
- President: Hashim Thaçi
- Prime Minister: Albin Kurti
- Preceded by: Rrustem Berisha
- Succeeded by: Armend Mehaj

Personal details
- Born: 9 June 1967 (age 59) Fshaj, Gjakovë, SFR Yugoslavia (present-day Kosovo)
- Party: Democratic League of Kosovo
- Children: 4
- Education: Belgrade Military Academy; Sarajevo Military Academy
- Occupation: Politician and soldier

Military service
- Allegiance: SFR Yugoslavia (until 1990) (Republic of Kosova) Kosovo (since 1998)
- Branch/service: Yugoslav People's Army; Armed Forces of the Republic of Kosova Kosovo Liberation Army; Kosovo Protection Corps; Kosovo Security Force
- Years of service: 1986–1990; 1998–2010
- Unit: KSF Rapid Reaction Brigade
- Battles/wars: Kosovo War: Battle of Košare; Operation Fenix

Anton Quni (born 9 June 1967) is the Kosovar and former Minister of Defence of Kosovo and of the Kosovo Security Forces (KSF), as well as the former Commander of the Kosovo Liberation Army (KLA).

== Career ==
Quni studied at the Military Academy in Belgrade and with the highest grades was promoted as a career officer with the Yugoslav People's Army. With the dissolution of Yugoslavia, he went to live in Switzerland and Croatia. When war erupted in Kosovo in 1998, he left Switzerland to take part. Quni joined the Kosovo Liberation Army (KLA) under the command of the Minister of War, Colonel Ahmet Krasniqi. With his unit, he conducted successful military operations in breaking the Yugoslav-Albanian border, in Koshare. Quni along with commanders Agim Ramadani, Sali Çekaj, Xhemajl Fetahu, and other soldiers took part in the Battle of Koshare. Since 2010, Quni has been a strong voice of the citizens in the Kosovo Parliament.

After the war, he served in the Kosovo Protection Corps and Kosovo Security Forces. From 2010 to 2017, he was Member of Parliament Commission for Internal Affairs, Security and Oversight of the Kosovo Security Forces. From 2017 to 2019, he was Member of Parliament Commission for Oversight of Kosovo Intelligence Agency.

He was the Chairman of the Democratic League of Kosovo Party for Prizren from 9 September 2017 to 14 March 2021.

== Personal ==
Anton Quni is married to a Croatian woman with whom he has four children.
