= Tahir Zemaj =

Kosovo Liberation Army soldier

- Born: 28 December 1951; Strellc i Epërm, Deçan, Kosovo, SFR Yugoslavia
- Died: 4 January 2003 (aged 51); Peja, Kosovo
- Military career
- Allegiance: Yugoslav People's Army; Armed Forces of the Republic of Kosovo (FARK); Kosovo Liberation Army
- Service years: 1973–1999
- Rank: Major (JNA); Commander-in-chief (FARK); General (KLA)
- Commands: KLA Commander of Dukagjini Operational Zone
- Conflicts: Kosovo War: Battle of Loxha
- Awards: Hero of Kosovo (posthumously)

Tahir Zemaj (28 December 1951 – 4 January 2003) was an Albanian Kosovo military leader. He was a Major in the Yugoslav People's Army, Commander-in-chief of the Armed Forces of the Republic of Kosova (FARK) and General of the Kosovo Liberation Army (KLA) during the Kosovo War (1998–1999), who was killed under suspicious circumstances as part of a killing series in the early 2000s.

== Early life ==
Tahir Zemaj was born on 28 December 1951, in Strellc i Epërm in the Deçan municipality. He completed his primary education in Strellc i Epërm and Isniq, and later attended secondary school at the "11 Maji" Gymnasium in Peja. Following his father's wishes, Zemaj enrolled in the Military-Technical Academy in Zagreb. In his second year, at the suggestion of General Ramiz Abdyli, he transferred to the Military Academy of the Yugoslav Ground Forces in Belgrade, where he encountered 28 other Albanian cadets, including Ahmet Krasniqi.

== Military career ==
=== Service in the Yugoslav People's Army ===
Zemaj continued his studies in the third and fourth years, specializing and ultimately graduating from the Military Academy in Sarajevo. His military career began in 1973, starting as a second lieutenant and later advancing to higher positions like colonel or major within the military hierarchy of the JNA. He served in various cities and military posts, including in Peja and Pristina.

Throughout his military service, Zemaj gained significant experience, which he later used in the decade long struggle for Kosovo's independence. When the institutions of the Republic of Kosova called for mobilization, Zemaj, along with other career officers like Rashit Mustafa, answered the call. With the help of Sali Çekaj, he established contacts with representatives of the Government of the Republic of Kosova in exile. Additionally, Çekaj advised Zemaj to connect with American forces at the Center for Intelligence and Counterintelligence for Southeastern Europe in Augsburg.

=== Involvement in the FARK ===
Bujar Bukoshi, the former Prime Minister in exile of the self-proclaimed Republic of Kosova from 1991 to 1999, created the FARK in Albania with a few dozen former Kosovo Albanian officers like Zemaj of the JNA gathered by Sali Çekaj. Most of the FARK members were loyal to the President of the Republic of Kosova, Ibrahim Rugova. The FARK mainly recruited trained Albanian conscripts from the Yugoslav Army.

=== Formal dissolution of FARK and joining the KLA ===
On 21 June 1998, Major Tahir Zemaj, along with hundreds of soldiers and military officers of the FARK, took an oath in the presence of Defense Minister Ahmet Krasniqi, which ended in the formal dissolution of the Fark. He was subsequently appointed commander of the 134th Brigade and the cores of the 131st and 133rd Brigades of the Kosovo Liberation Army.

Zemaj's involvement with the KLA was marked by his attempt to implement organized military strategies and tactics which were essential in winning the first Battle of Lođa. However, his approach led to tensions within the local command of the KLA in Dukagjin.

The KLA General Staff later appointed him deputy commander of Territorial Defense for the Operational Zone of Dukagjin. Some factions within the KLA disagreed with Zemaj's methods and strategic decisions, resulting in internal conflicts which culminated in September 1998 and led to the Desertion of him and his men, so the KLA had to be fully reorganized by the brothers of Ramush Haradinaj and Shkelzën Haradinaj in the Dukagjin zone.

Nevertheless in November 1998, he was regiven responsibility for overseeing local KLA combat operations and was promoted from Colonel to General. Zemaj was considered a divisive figure due to his distinct military background and vision for the KLA's operations.

== Death ==
After surviving two assassination attempts earlier, Zemaj was murdered in a drive-by shooting at 53-years-old, along with his 22-year-old son, Enes Zemaj, and his 24-year-old nephew, Hasan Zemaj, in the city of Peja, on 4 January 2003. His nephew, Hasan Zemaj, also headed youth movement of the LDK in Deçan. According to news reports, the attackers were in two cars, one of which had an Albanian license plate and used an AK-47.

The killing of Zemaj is viewed by some as a revenge, for his involvement as a witness against Daut Haradinaj, the brother of former KLA leader Ramush Haradinaj, who were sentenced with five other members of the KLA by a UN court in Kosovo for kidnapping and murder of four former FARK and LDK party members.

His death and the earlier serial assassinations and suspicious deaths of former key-figures of the KLA, like Besim Mala or Ekrem Rexha in the early 2000s after the Kosovo War, remain an unsolved enigma in the early history of Kosovo under International Administration.

== Legacy ==
He posthumously earned the Order "Hero of Kosovo" by the President of Kosovo and Medal "Honor of the Nation" by the President of Albania.
