= Adem Demaçi =

Kosovar politician and human rights defender (1936–2018)

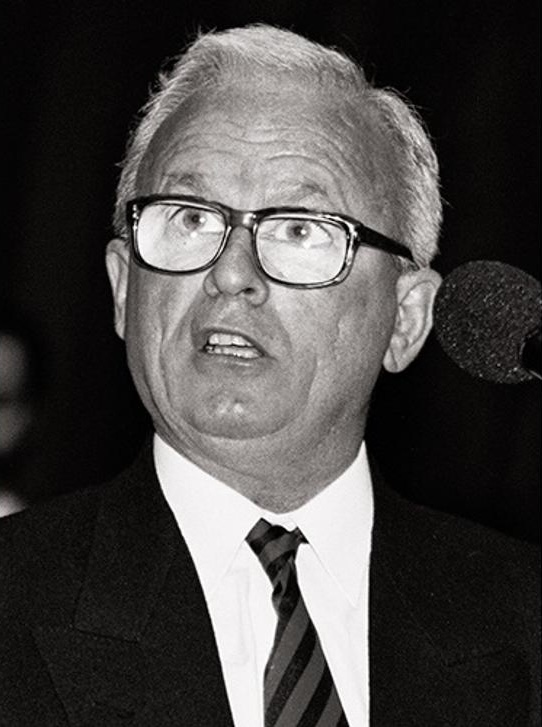
- Adem Demaçi, 1991

Political Director of Kosovo Liberation Army
- In office August 1998 – March 1999
- Preceded by: Office established
- Succeeded by: Hashim Thaçi

Personal details
- Born: 26 February 1936 Podujevë, Kingdom of Yugoslavia (now Kosovo)
- Died: 26 July 2018 (aged 82) Pristina, Kosovo
- Resting place: Martyr Cemetery, Pristina
- Party: Parliamentary Party (1996–1998)
- Spouse: Xhemajlije Hoxha
- Children: Abetare and Shqiptar
- Education: Ss. Cyril and Methodius University of Skopje; University of Belgrade; University of Pristina
- Occupation: Author; Politician
- Known for: Activist for human rights Peaceful struggle against the Yugoslav authorities in Kosovo; Proposed confederation of Balkania
- Nicknames: Balkan Mandela; Baca Adem; Adem Dema
- Writing career
- Period: 1950–2017
- Notable work: Gjarprinjt e gjakut ("The Serpents of Blood")
- Notable awards: Sakharov Prize (1990); Human Rights Prize at the University of Oslo (1995); Hero of Kosovo (2010)

Adem Demaçi (pronounced [dɛmatʃi]; 26 February 1936 – 26 July 2018) was a Kosovo Albanian author, politician, and human rights defender and independence activist for the independence of Kosovo.

== Early life and education ==
Demaçi was born in Podujevë, Kingdom of Yugoslavia in 1936 and studied literature, law, and education in Pristina, Belgrade, and Skopje respectively. In the 1950s, he published a number of short stories with pointed social commentary in the magazine Jeta e re ("New Life"), as well as a 1958 novel titled Gjarpijt e gjakut ("The Serpents of Blood"), exploring the issue of blood vendettas among ethnic Albanians in communist Albania and Kosovo. The latter work brought him literary fame.

Demaçi was first arrested for his opposition to the authoritarian government of Josip Broz Tito in 1958, serving three years in prison. In 1963, he founded the Revolutionary Movement for the Union of Albanians, an underground Albanian nationalist political organization for the self-determination of ethnic Albanians in SFR Yugoslavia.

Demaçi was again imprisoned 1964–1974 and 1975–1990. In the late 1980s, he was considered one of Yugoslavia's most prominent political dissidents. In 2010, he received the order Hero of Kosovo.

At the age of 82, Demaçi died on 26 July 2018 in Pristina, Kosovo. His death was marked by three days of national mourning. On 28 July 2018, Demaçi was buried in the cemetery of martyrs in Pristina, in a state funeral ceremony.

== Political career ==
After his release, he was appointed Chairman of the Council for the Defense of Human Rights and Freedoms of the People of Kosovo from 1991 to 1995, during the prewar period. He also served as editor-in-chief of Zëri, a magazine based in Pristina, from 1991 to 1993. In 1991, he was awarded the European Parliament's Sakharov Prize for Freedom of Thought. On 24 March 1993, Demaçi went on a hunger strike together with many journalists in defense of free speech and the newspaper Rilindja.

Due to the Kosovar insurgency against the Yugoslav central state, Demaçi moved into politics in 1996, replacing Bajram Kosumi as President of the Parliamentary Party of Kosovo; Kosumi became his Vice-President. In the same year, Demaçi proposed the creation of Balkania as an alternative, peaceful resolution to the Serbo–Albanian ethnic conflict; it would have transformed the rump third Yugoslavia into a confederation consisting of the democratic Republics of Kosovo, Serbia, and Montenegro. The proposal became moot when the Republic of Montenegro declared its independence from FR Yugoslavia in 2006, and after the Republic of Kosovo declared its independence as well in 2008.

Two years later he joined the Kosovo Liberation Army (KLA), serving as the General Political Representative of its political wing since August 1998. In a 1998 interview with The New York Times, he refused to condemn the KLA's use of violence, stating that "the path of nonviolence has gotten us nowhere. People who live under this kind of repression have the right to resist." Eventually, Demaçi agreed to withdraw his personal vision for a Balkan confederation, while the KLA abandoned its demand for the union of all the fragmented Albanian communities in the Balkans. They agreed to work for an independent and sovereign Republic of Kosovo in accordance with the will of the people in the Socialist Autonomous Province of Kosovo as had been expressed in the 1991 Kosovan independence referendum. In 1999, he resigned from the KLA after it attended peace talks in France, criticising the proposed deal for not guaranteeing Kosovo's independence. Sources stated that Demaçi had grown estranged from the KLA's younger, more pragmatic leadership, leaving him "faced with a decision of jumping or waiting to be pushed".

Though Demaçi's wife left Kosovo before the war, he remained in Pristina with his 70-year-old sister during the entire Kosovo War. He was critical of Ibrahim Rugova and other Albanian leaders who fled the conflict, stating that they were missing an important historical event. After the war, Demaçi served as director of the Committee for Understanding, Tolerance, and Co-habitation within the CDHRF. He visited almost every place where ethnic minorities were living in UN-administered Kosovo, encouraging them to stay, and calling on Albanians not to attack them. Demaçi served as director of Kosovo Radio and Television until January 2004. He remained active in politics, affiliated with Albin Kurti, head of the Vetëvendosje! political party.
