= Rrustem Berisha =

Kosovar politician and military commander

Minister of Defense of Kosovo
- In office 9 September 2017 – 3 February 2020
- President: Hashim Thaçi
- Prime Minister: Ramush Haradinaj
- Preceded by: Haki Demolli
- Succeeded by: Anton Quni

Member of the Assembly of the Republic of Kosovo
- In office 2014 – September 2017

Personal details
- Born: Rrustem Berisha; 2 March 1965 (age 61) Doberdol, Peć, SFR Yugoslavia (modern-day Peja, Kosovo)
- Party: Alliance for the Future of Kosovo
- Children: 4
- Occupation: Politician and military officer

Military service
- Allegiance: Yugoslavia; Croatia; Kosova
- Branch/service: Yugoslav Ground Forces; Croatian Army; Armed Forces of the Republic of Kosova; Kosovo Liberation Army; Kosovo Protection Corps; Kosovo Security Force
- Years of service: 1984–1991, 1991–1995, 1998–2015
- Unit: KSF Rapid Reaction Brigade
- Battles/wars: Croatian War of Independence; Kosovo War: Battle of Košare; Operation Fenix

Rrustem Berisha (born 2 March 1965) is a Kosovar politician and military officer. He was Minister of Defense in Haradinaj cabinet. During the Yugoslav Wars, he fought in the Croatian War of Independence and the Kosovo War. He was a commander of the Kosovo Liberation Army (KLA) during the Battle of Košare.

== Early life and education ==
Rrustem Berisha was born in Doberdol, Peć, Yugoslavia on 2 March 1965. From 1980 to 1984, Berisha attended a military high school in Sarajevo, Yugoslavia.

== Career ==
After graduating from military school, Berisha served in the Yugoslav People's Army. From 1984 to 1985, Berisha served as a platoon commander in Karlovac. From 1985 to 1988, Berisha attended a military school in Sarajevo to train to be an officer.

From 1988 to 1991, after graduation to a Yugoslav People's Army officer, Berisha served as a company commander in Delnice, Croatia, which was then part of Yugoslavia.

From 1991 to 1992, Berisha fought in the Croatian War of Independence on the side of the Croatians.

From 1998 to 1999, Berisha was a member of the Kosovo Liberation Army (KLA). In this time he fought in the Dukagjini region of Kosovo.

In 1999, following the disarmament of the KLA, Berisha joined the Kosovo Protection Corps (KPC). From 1999 to 2002, he served as the Chief of Staff of the KPC's Second Defense Zone.

From 2002 to 2009, Berisha directed the Hamëz Jashari military academy.

In 2009, Berisha was named the Deputy Commander of the Rapid Reaction Brigade of the newly formed Kosovo Security Force (KSF). The KSF was a relatively new entity at the time, having come into existence on 21 January 2009. Berisha continued in this position until 2014.

=== Politics ===
In 2013, Berisha entered politics, joining the Alliance for the Future of Kosovo. That year, he became a member of the AFK's governing council and its presidency.

In 2014, Berisha ran for a seat in the Assembly of the Republic of Kosovo and won. He became a member of the Assembly's Committee on Rights, Interests of Communities and Returns and the Committee for Economic Development. He also became the Vice Chairperson of Oversight Committee for Kosovo Intelligence Agency.

In February 2016, a Serbian court convicted Berisha and seven other former KLA soldiers in absentia of acts of terrorism for attacks on soldiers of the Yugoslav army in September 1998. Before the trial ended, Berisha questioned the credibility of the indictment and the allegations on which it was based.

Berisha was reelected to the Assembly in the 2017 elections in Kosovo.

On 9 September 2017, Berisha was appointed the Minister of the Kosovo Security Force. He replaced Haki Demolli.

As minister for the security force, Berisha worked towards closer cooperation between the Albanian Armed Forces and the Kosovo Security Force.
