= Armed Forces of the Republic of Kosova =

Paramilitary organization, 1998–1999

- Forcat e Armatosura të Republikës së Kosovës
- Leaders: Ahmet Krasniqi X Tahir Zemaj; Bujar Bukoshi; Sali Çekaj †; Agim Ramadani †; Anton Quni; Rashit Mustafa †; Hisen Berisha; Nazif Ramabaja; Ekrem Rexha
- Founded: 1991
- Dates active: August 1998–1999
- Country: Republic of Kosova
- Group: 2021 - Bardh Krasniqi
- Active regions: Kosovo
- Size: 200-1,800
- Part of: Kosovo Liberation Army as 138th Brigade (from late 1998)
- Wars: Prewar period (Kosovo); Kosovo War; Battle of Lođa; Operation Fenix; Battle of Košare

The Armed Forces of the Republic of Kosova (AFRK; Albanian: Forcat e Armatosura të Republikës së Kosovës, FARK) was a military of Republic of Kosova, paramilitary organization and military wing of the Democratic League of Kosovo (LDK), the main centre-right party in Kosovo established by Ibrahim Rugova and Bujar Bukoshi. It was active during the Kosovo War from August 1998 until the war's end in June 1999.

== History ==
Bujar Bukoshi, the former Prime Minister in exile of the self-proclaimed Republic of Kosova from 1991 to 1999, created the FARK in Albania with a few dozen former Kosovo Albanian officers of the Yugoslav People's Army (JNA) gathered by Sali Çekaj. He then put it under the command of former colonel Ahmet Krasniqi. Most of the FARK members were then loyal to the President of the Republic of Kosova, Ibrahim Rugova, while the rival group Kosovo Liberation Army (KLA) was led by Hashim Thaçi, a man who had earned credibility among separatists due to the alleged shortcomings in FARK's achievements.

Bukoshi, while spending most of his time in Bonn, Germany, had been a representative for the Kosovar Albanians from 1991, the year they tried to proclaimed independence, to 1998. On 2 April 1999, as Rugova had then been sidelined by recent developments, Hashim Thaçi proclaimed himself Prime Minister in his place, while Bukoshi refused to recognize him and hand over the funds he had received from the Albanian Diaspora in the West. As a representative of Rugova, Bukoshi received regular contributions from the diaspora for his "Republic of Kosova Fund" which had been spent to finance the parallel government of Kosovo under Rugova, with a network of private schools and health care centers. The KLA then created its own fund, Vendlindja Thërret ("The Homeland calls"), both funds now being used to buy military equipment.

The KLA also tried to prevent recruitment into the FARK among the Albanian diaspora in Western Europe, and to attract them to its own centers of Durrës, Tirana and Kukës in Albania. FARK and the KLA separately fought Yugoslav forces, and also fought each other. Politicians in Albania took sides in the rivalry between the KLA and the FARK, with the Socialist government in Tirana supporting Thaçi and the KLA, while the opposition Democratic Party of Sali Berisha supported the FARK. Some of the FARK officers were incorporated later under the KLA umbrella. 30 FARK members were jailed for taking part in violent anti-government demonstrations in Tirana in September 1998. FARK said they only participated after the murder of Ahmet Krasniqi, a former FARK leader, on 21 September 1998.

The organization later joined the KLA in 1998 as the 138th Brigade "Agim Ramadani", named after FARK commander Agim Ramadani, who died during the Battle of Košare. The brigade mainly fought in the Operational zone of Dukagjin and later launched Operation Košare in 1999. FARK mainly recruited trained Albanian conscripts from the Yugoslav Army, as well as experienced Albanian volunteers of the Croatian Army, which fought the Yugoslav Army during the Yugoslav Wars.

== Rivalry with the KLA/PDK ==
Numerous members of the FARK and the LDK party were murdered during the rivalry with the KLA, but former members of the KLA were also assassinated. The number of victims during the rivalry is estimated currently at more than 1,000. The perpetrators or instigators were mostly former senior KLA leaders – after the war, they were almost exclusively integrated into civilian Kosovo Protection Corps (KPC), the successor to the KLA. The command structure and composition, and even the coat of arms of the KPC is essentially identical with the officially disbanded KLA. This also applies to their leader. First general was Agim Çeku, a former commander in chief of the KLA. Some former KLA members also joined the Kosovo Police. The rivalry did not end after NATO troops entered Kosovo in June 1999 and the paramilitary groups were officially disbanded.

In December 2002, Daut Haradinaj, the brother of former KLA leader Ramush Haradinaj, was sentenced with five other members of the KLA by a UN court in Kosovo for his involvement in the kidnapping and murder of four former FARK and LDK party members. In the case against Daut Haradinaj previously testified Tahir Zemaj, a former FARK leader, as witness against Daut. Zemaj was murdered in 2003 along with his son Enis and nephew Hasan. They had also been a leader of the FARK in Peć, financing the former leaders of the KLA, Ramush Haradinaj and Hashim Thaçi. Ramush Haradinaj was suspected of murder. In November 2003, Sebahate Tolaj and Isuf Haklaj were shot while driving to work. Both had served under Zemaj as FARK members.

In April 2005, days after Ramush Haradinaj surrendered to The Hague, Enver Haradinaj, another brother of Ramush Haradinaj was assassinated in a drive-by shootout in Kosovo, according to the UN security forces, there was a confrontation between rival Kosovo-Albanian clans. Presumably the long-standing feud between the Musaj clan and the Haradinaj clan. The Musaj family was prominent in the FARK during the late 1990s. Between 1998 and 1999, the Haradinaj family, which originated from the Peć area in western Kosovo, was influential in the KLA, became embroiled in a vendetta with the Musaj's. Already in 2000, Ramush Haradinaj should have been involved in a gun battle with members of the Musaj family at their home in Strellc, also in western Kosovo. The Musaj's allege that he ordered the murder of their brother and three others in 1999. The murder of Enver Haradinaj has evoked heated reached in Pro-KLA parts of Kosovo.

On 3 June 2005, Bardhyl Ajeti, a journalist on the Kosovar newspaper Bota Sot, was shot near Gjilan, and later died of his wounds. Bota Sot was close to LDK and Ajeti was a vocal critic of the post-war elite, most of whom were associated with the KLA. Bardhyl Ajeti was not the only journalist of Bota Sot who was killed in Kosovo. Bekim Kastrati was killed on 19 October 2001 along with two other men who were riding in his car at the time in village Lauša near Pristina. On 28 June 2005, the body of FARK commander Rashit Mustafa had been found by civilians in Gjakova. Mustafa is believed to be a political murder of the rivalry. Then, on 12 July 2005, two members of the Musaj family were killed in a drive-by shooting near Peć in western Kosovo. The Haradinaj-Musaj feud became emblematic of the wider FARK-KLA feud.

On 1 January 2010, Bedri Krasniqi was sentenced to 27 years of imprisonment for the murder of two and attempted murder of one member of the Kosovo Police Service. Although these are the military wings of LDK and Alliance for the Future of Kosovo (AAK), to date, there are between the LDK and AAK, as well as the PDK, the political successor to the KLA, continuing political disagreements.
