= 1992 Kosovan general election =

- 24 May 1992
- Presidential election
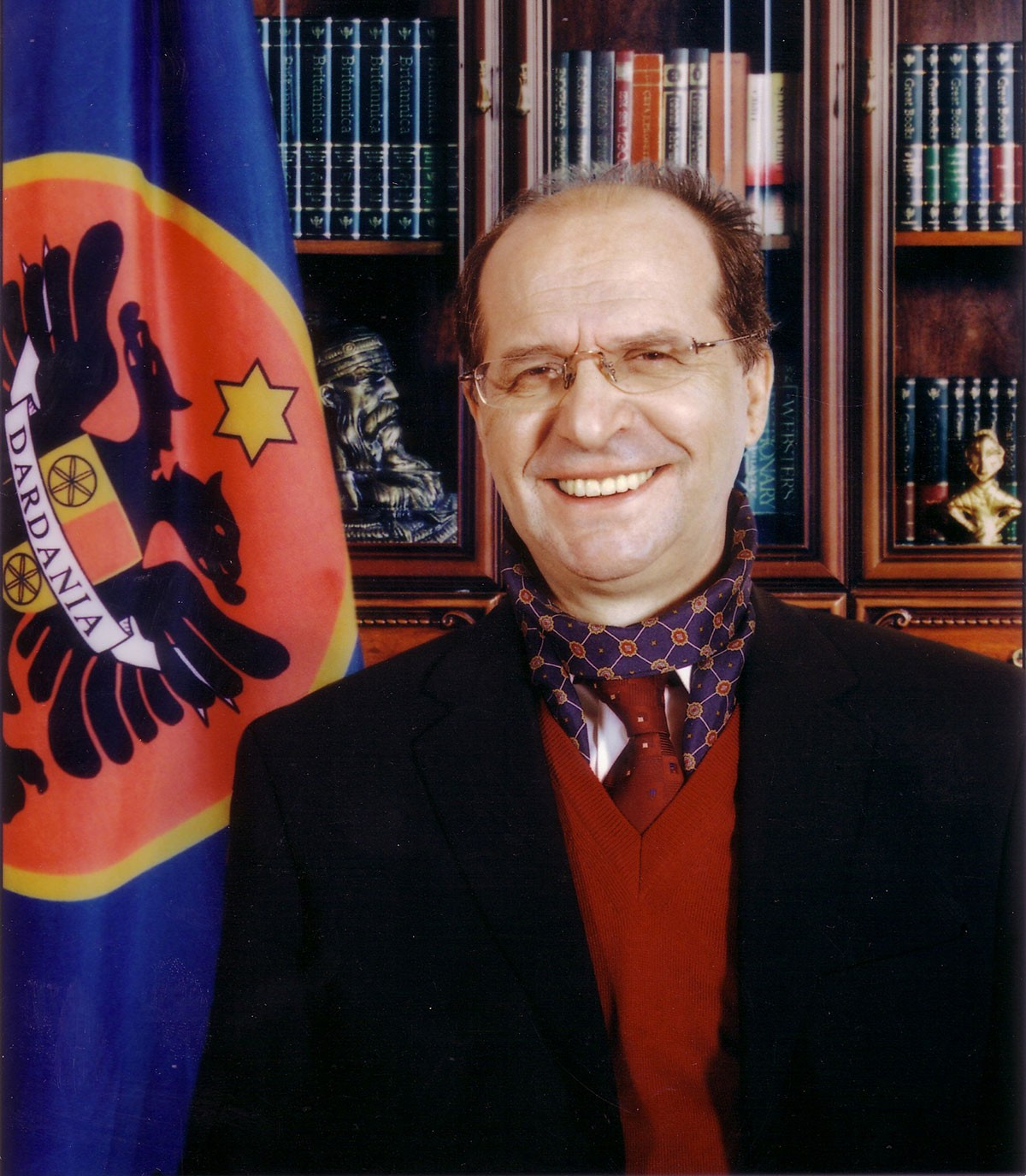
| Candidate | Ibrahim Rugova |
| Party | LDK |
| Popular vote | 863,745 |
| Percentage | 100% |
Elected President
Ibrahim Rugova
LDK
- Assembly election
- 127 of the 140 seats in the Assembly of Kosovo; 66 seats needed for a majority
| Party | Leader | Vote % | Seats |
|---|---|---|---|
| LDK | Ibrahim Rugova | 76.38 | 96 |
| PPK | Veton Surroi | 4.86 | 13 |
| PFK | | 3.15 | 7 |
| PSHDK | Mark Krasniqi | 3.10 | 7 |
| SDA | | 0.93 | 1 |
| Independents | – | 3.28 | 2 |
This lists parties that won seats. See the complete results below.
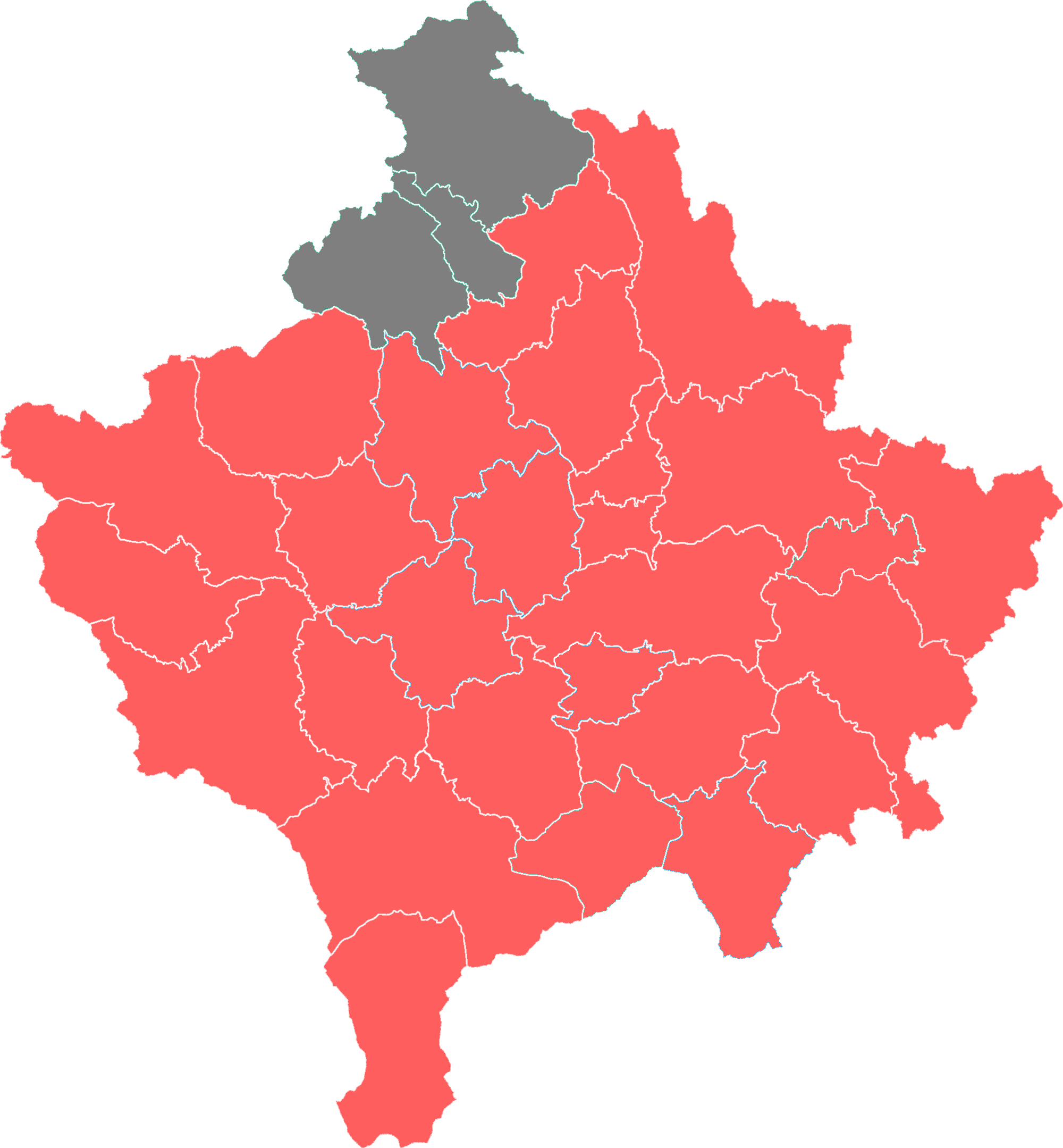
Results by each municipality;
LDK No Data

General elections were held in Kosovo on 24 May 1992 to elect a President and Assembly. The overwhelming majority in the Assembly was won by the Democratic League of Kosovo (LDK), while its leader Ibrahim Rugova was elected President of Kosovo.

Prior to the elections, on 8 May the LDK declared that, "since the May 24 elections, announced by the Assembly of the Republic of Kosova, not as a struggle of Kosovo political parties for power, but as an organized and massive attempt to not accept the power structures and the status that Serbia is trying to impose on us, the LDK will try to campaign, organize and conduct elections to develop in the spirit of full cooperation, in different ways and forms, between all political parties and other political entities ".

== Conduct ==
The elections were monitored by eight groups of observers from the United States and European countries. Konrad Hubers, who led the Delegation of the American Congress Foundation for Human Rights, assessed that these elections are a historic moment for Kosovo.

The Serbian government declared the elections illegal and deployed a large number of police officers to put pressure on and disrupt the election process. However, 89.32 percent of voters took part in the voting and 99.7 percent of them voted for Ibrahim Rugova as president.

== Results ==
The elections were attended mainly by Albanians and Turks, while the Serb-Montenegrin minority had a small turnout. According to the constitution and the electoral system, 14 seats, or 10 percent of them, belonged to Serb candidates who boycotted the election process. But these seats remained unfulfilled all the time, as the right of the Serb minority to administer them. Such an act was not undertaken by threatening and coercive factors, rather it was an expression of the philosophy of peace and international law for the respect of minority rights. Meanwhile, it was an act by which the Albanians proved the difference with Milosevic's policy in treating the Serb-Montenegrins minority.

=== President ===
The presidential elections were held in both Kosovo and abroad in places where Kosovo Albanians were employed. In Kosovo, 762,257 voters voted for Ibrahim Rugova for President of Kosovo (invalid ballots and "against" were 3812), while 105,300 voters voted outside Kosovo.

| Candidate | Party | Votes | % |
|---|---|---|---|
| Ibrahim Rugova | Democratic League of Kosovo | 863,745 | 100.00 |
| Total | | 863,745 | 100.00 |
| Valid votes | | 863,745 | 99.56 |
| Invalid/blank votes | | 3,812 | 0.44 |
| Total votes | | 867,557 | 100.00 |

=== Assembly ===
The Democratic League of Kosovo received 76% of the vote and won 96 seats in parliament. The Parliamentary Party of Kosovo received 4.86%, winning 13 seats. It was followed by the Peasant Party and the Albanian Christian Democratic Party of Kosovo with just over 23,000 votes and seven seats each. The 13 seats for Serbs and Montenegrins were unfilled.

| Party | Votes | % | Seats |
|---|---|---|---|
| Democratic League of Kosovo | 574,755 | 76.38 | 96 |
| Parliamentary Party of Kosovo | 36,549 | 4.86 | 14 |
| Peasant Party of Kosovo | 23,682 | 3.15 | 7 |
| Albanian Christian Democratic Party of Kosovo | 23,303 | 3.10 | 7 |
| PRK | 14,080 | 1.87 | 0 |
| Party of Albanian National Union | 11,770 | 1.56 | 0 |
| Albanian National Democratic Party | 10,158 | 1.35 | 0 |
| Party of Democratic Action | 6,961 | 0.93 | 1 |
| SHKSH | 6,412 | 0.85 | 0 |
| Social Democratic Party of Kosovo | 6,064 | 0.81 | 0 |
| PLSH | 3,458 | 0.46 | 0 |
| LGJK | 3,112 | 0.41 | 0 |
| PRSH | 2,493 | 0.33 | 0 |
| FISH | 2,033 | 0.27 | 0 |
| LRDK | 1,079 | 0.14 | 0 |
| SHZP | 509 | 0.07 | 0 |
| PPSH | 441 | 0.06 | 0 |
| THP | 345 | 0.05 | 0 |
| HK | 288 | 0.04 | 0 |
| SHBI | 132 | 0.02 | 0 |
| PSHGJ | 156 | 0.02 | 0 |
| Independents | 24,702 | 3.28 | 2 |
| Total | 752,482 | 100.00 | 127 |
| Valid votes | 752,482 | 98.64 | |
| Invalid/blank votes | 10,384 | 1.36 | |
| Total votes | 762,866 | 100.00 | |
| Registered voters/turnout | 853,432 | 89.39 | |
Source: Source

== Aftermath ==
The new Assembly first attempted to be constituted on 23 July, secretly in an Islamic religious school in Pristina, but was blocked at the school entrance by numerous heavily armed police forces. Five deputies were arrested and sentenced to two months in prison, "for hostile activity against the territory of the Republic of Serbia and violation of its constitution." Therefore, the Kosovo Parliament conducted its work in working groups, mainly in exile, in Albania and Macedonia, where the deputies were forced to flee, after being threatened by the repressive measures of the Serbian state, which these deputies had declared illegitimate in the territory of Kosovo.
