= Operation Eagle (Kosovo War) =

1998 Kosovo Liberation Army operation

- Part of the Kosovo War
Date	15 August 1998
Location	Vokša and Slup, Dečani
Result	KLA victory

Belligerents
Kosovo Liberation Army	(Federal Republic of Yugoslavia) Yugoslav Army

Commanders and leaders
Agim Ramadani; Bajram Mazrekaj	(Federal Republic of Yugoslavia) Milorad Rađenović †

Units involved
"KOBRA" unit from the 3rd Operative Group (later renamed to 138th Brigade "Agim Ramadani")	(Federal Republic of Yugoslavia) Yugoslav Army (Federal Republic of Yugoslavia) Serbian police

Strength
8 soldiers	(Federal Republic of Yugoslavia) Unknown

Casualties and losses
None	(Federal Republic of Yugoslavia) 6 killed

Operation Eagle was a military operation by the "Kobra Unit" of the Kosovo Liberation Army in the villages of Vokša and Slup against Yugoslav forces. The engagement resulted in the deaths of six Yugoslav policemen and soldiers, meanwhile the KLA suffered no casualties. The KLA also managed to capture ammunition and equipment from the Yugoslav Army, before withdrawing back to the Albanian-Yugoslav border.

== Background ==
In 1989, Belgrade abolished self-rule in Serbia's two autonomous provinces, Vojvodina and Kosovo. Kosovo, a province inhabited predominantly by ethnic Albanians, was of great historical and cultural significance to Serbs. Prior to the mid-19th century they had formed a majority in the province, but by 1990 represented only about 10 percent of the population. Alarmed by their dwindling numbers, the province's Serbs began to fear they were being "squeezed out" by the Albanians, with whom ethnic tensions had been brewing since the early 1980s. As soon as Kosovo's autonomy was abolished, a minority government run by Serbs and Montenegrins was appointed by Serbian President Slobodan Milošević to oversee the province, enforced by thousands of heavily armed paramilitaries from Serbia-proper. Albanian culture was systematically repressed and hundreds of thousands of Albanians working in state-owned companies lost their jobs.

In 1996, a ragtag group of Albanian nationalists calling themselves the Kosovo Liberation Army (KLA) began attacking the Yugoslav Army (Serbo-Croatian Latin: Vojska Jugoslavije; VJ) and the Serbian Ministry of Internal Affairs (Serbo-Croatian Latin: Ministarstvo unutrašnjih poslova; MUP) in Kosovo. Their goal was to separate the province from the rest of Yugoslavia, which following the separation of Slovenia, Croatia, Macedonia and Bosnia-Herzegovina in 1991–92, became a rump federation made up of Serbia and Montenegro. At first the KLA carried out hit-and-run attacks: 31 in 1996, 55 in 1997, and 66 in January and February 1998 alone. The group quickly gained popularity among young Kosovo Albanians, many of whom favored a more aggressive approach and rejected the non-violent resistance of politician Ibrahim Rugova. It received a significant boost in 1997 when civil unrest in neighboring Albania led to thousands of weapons from the Albanian Army's depots being looted. Many of these weapons ended up in the hands of the KLA. The group's popularity skyrocketed after the VJ and MUP attacked the compound of KLA leader Adem Jashari in March 1998, killing him, his closest associates and most of his extended family. The attack motivated thousands of young Kosovo Albanians to join the KLA, fueling the Kosovar uprising that eventually erupted in the spring of 1998.

== Attack ==
On August 14, the Kobra unit orchestrated the evacuation of civilians and numerous wounded individuals from Junik, situated between the villages of Gjocaj and Jasiq. Under the leadership of Agim Ramadani, the unit meticulously cleared the mined road for evacuation after every conceivable route had been booby-trapped. Agim Ramadani devised and executed another Operation the following day.

On August 15, 1998, Agim Ramadani, the commander of the 138th Brigade of the Kosovo Liberation Army, orchestrated Operation "Eagle" with the objective of assaulting the Žilović police station and Yugoslav forces in Voksh and Sllup, in the Deçan Municipality. The operation was executed by 8 specialized KLA soldiers from the Kobra unit within the 138th Brigade, targeting a Yugoslav battalion. The well planned attack started at 9:30 am and ended by 9:37 am. Following the successful operation, the unit tactically withdrew, crossing the Yugoslav-Albanian border at 11:35 am. The KLA seized a substantial quantity of weapons during the assault. There were no casualties among the Kobra unit, while four Yugoslav policemen and two Yugoslav Soldiers were killed in the operation.

== List of the Yugoslav personnel killed in the attack ==
- Milorad Rađenović, Police Commander killed in Voksh.
- Zdravko Miskin, Policeman killed in Voksh.
- Dragoljub Šuković, Policeman killed in Voksh.
- Gojko Vojnović, Policeman killed in Voksh.
- Nikola Vujičić, Soldier killed in Voksh.
- Mišo Uboja, Soldier killed in Sllup.

== Aftermath ==
Agim Ramadani withdrew to the Yugoslav-Albanian border and immediately after the attack, on the same day, at 12:30 am, Yugoslav forces launched a large-scale operation in the Deçan area. The offensive involved 46 tanks, four military jets, and eight helicopter gunships. Additionally, a significant number of troops, transported on 20 trucks and various other vehicles, were deployed in the offensive against the Albanian villages. The operation spanned eight villages in Deçan and ended at 6 pm. In the following month on September 30, 1998, Agim Ramadani initiated his second notable operation against Yugoslav forces. This operation, named "Operation Fenix", would simultaneously become his most renowned attack on Yugoslav forces, further solidifying his strategic prowess and leaving a lasting mark in the conflict.
