= Kosovo declaration of independence =

Kosovo declaration of independence may refer to:

- 1990 Kosovo declaration of independence
- 2008 Kosovo declaration of independence
