= Gushac =

Gushac Gušavac
- Village
- Location in Kosovo
- Coordinates: 42°53′02″N 20°49′28″E
- Location: Kosovo
- District: Mitrovicë
- Municipality: Mitrovicë

Population (2024)
  - Total: 456
- Time zone: UTC+1 (CET)
  - Summer (DST): UTC+2 (CEST)

Gushac (in Albanian) or Gušavac (in Serbian: Гушавац) is a village in the municipality of Mitrovica in the District of Mitrovica, Kosovo. According to the 2011 census, it has 475 inhabitants, all Albanians.

== Notable people ==
- Agim Bahtiri, former mayor of Mitrovica
- Harun Beka, political activist and KLA soldier killed in the Battle of Koshare
- Samir Sahiti, former football player
