= Samir Sahiti =

Albanian professional footballer (born 1988)

Personal information
- Full name: Samir Sahiti
- Date of birth: 15 August 1988 (age 38)
- Place of birth: Gushac, Mitrovicë, SFR Yugoslavia
- Height: 1.83 m (6 ft 0 in)
- Position: Defensive midfielder

Team information
- Current team: KEK-u

Youth career
- 2003–2006: Trepça '89

Senior career*
Years	Team	Apps	(Gls)
2006–2009	Trepça '89	50	(1)
2009–2010	Trepça	22	(1)
2010–2011	Hysi	23	(2)
2011–2012	Renova	10	(0)
2012–2013	Drenica	25	(3)
2013–2014	Ferizaj	15	(2)
2014–2016	Skënderbeu	4	(0)
2016	Bylis	3	(0)
2016–2017	Trepça	8	(0)
2017	Vëllaznimi	19	(1)
2018	Flamurtari		
2018–2019	Besa Pejë		
2019–2020	Trepça		
2021–2024	Trepça '89	+29	(+1)

Managerial career
- 2024–2025: Trepça '89 (assistant)
- 2026–: KEK-u
- * Club domestic league appearances and goals as of 18 October 2019

Samir Sahiti (born 15 August 1988) is an Albanian former professional footballer who last played for Kosovan club KF Trepça '89 where he is currently an assistant coach.

== Honours ==
=== Trepça ===
- Kosovo Superleague: 2009–10

=== Hysi ===
- Kosovo Superleague: 2010–11

=== Skënderbeu ===
- Albanian Superliga: 2013–14
- Albanian Cup: 2013–14
