= Balkania (proposed state) =

Proposed state in the Balkans

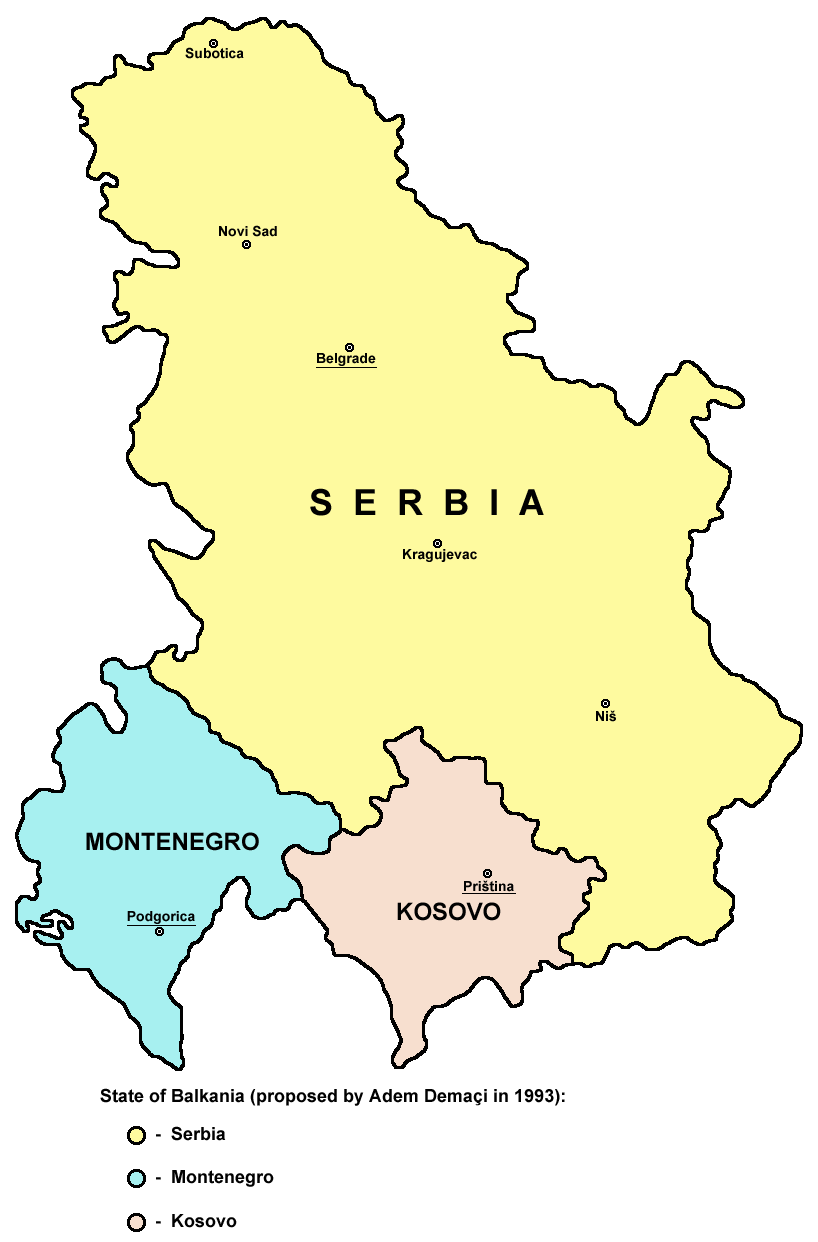
Proposed confederate state of Balkania: Kosovo (light red), Serbia (yellow), and Montenegro (light blue)

Balkania, or the Balkan Federation, was the name of a hypothetical confederacy proposed as an independent successor state to the Federal Republic of Yugoslavia in the Balkans, suggested by the Kosovo Albanian politician and human rights defender Adem Demaçi in 1996.

Intended as an alternative, peaceful resolution to the Serbo–Albanian ethnic conflict, it would have transformed the rump third Yugoslavia into a confederation consisting of the democratic Republics of Kosovo, Serbia, and Montenegro. The proposal became moot when the Republic of Montenegro declared its independence from FR Yugoslavia in 2006, and after the still disputed Republic of Kosovo declared its independence as well in 2008.

Another confederation with the same name, "Balkania", was proposed during the Interwar period by the Romanian historian Victor Papacostea in 1936, in order to solve regional conflicts between Bulgaria and Romania.

== See also ==
- Albania–Kosovo relations
  - Kosovo Albanians
  - Unification of Albania and Kosovo
- Albania–North Macedonia relations
  - Albanians in North Macedonia
  - Republic of Ilirida (proposed state)
- Albania–Serbia relations
  - Albania–Yugoslavia relations
  - Agreement on the path to normalization between Kosovo and Serbia (2023)
  - Open Balkan (political and economic zone between Serbia, North Macedonia, and Albania)
- Balkan Federation
- Balkan Wars (1912–1913)
- Balkanization
- Berlin Process
- Foreign relations of Albania
- Foreign relations of Serbia
- Kosovo–Serbia relations
  - Kosovo Serbs
  - Partition of Kosovo
  - Serb enclaves in Kosovo
- Regional Roaming Agreement
- Yugoslav Wars (1991–2001)
  - Dayton Agreement (1995)
  - International sanctions against FR Yugoslavia (1991–2000)
  - Kosovo War (1998–1999)
  - NATO bombing of Yugoslavia (1999)
