= Parliamentary Party of Kosovo =

Parliamentary Party of Kosovo Partia Parliamentare e Kosovës
- Leader: Bajram Kosumi
- Founded: 1990
- Merged into: Alliance for the Future of Kosovo (AAK)
- Headquarters: Pristina
- Ideology: Balkan nationalism; (Civic/Left-wing); Social liberalism; Social democracy; Third Way; Parliamentarianism
- Political position: Center-left to centre
- International affiliation: Liberal International; Socialist International; Progressive Alliance
- Colours: Yellow, White

The Parliamentary Party of Kosovo (Partia Parliamentare e Kosovës, PPK) is a political party in the Republic of Kosovo. It is led by former prime minister Bajram Kosumi. It is one of the oldest parties in Kosovo.

The party was founded 1990, out of the Kosovo Youth Parliament by Veton Surroi, who later left the party and formed the Reformist Party ORA. PPK has a history of being a longtime opposition party and a distant second to the ruling Democratic League of Kosovo under the Republic of Kosova (1990-2000). From 1996 to 1998, the party was led by human rights activist Adem Demaçi.

At the last legislative elections, 24 October 2004, the party was part of the Alliance for the Future of Kosovo.
