= Nasim Haradinaj =

Kosovar politician (born 1963)

- Born: May 21, 1963 (age 63); Gllogjan, Deçan, Kosovo

Nasim Haradinaj (born 21 May 1963) is a Kosovar Albanian politician and former KLA veteran. He served as Deputy Chairman of the KLA War Veterans’ Association (OVL-UÇK) and is a cousin of former Kosovo Prime Minister Ramush Haradinaj.

== Early life and background ==
Nasim Haradinaj was born on 21 May 1963 in Gllogjan, Deçan municipality, Kosovo. He studied law at the University of Pristina. In 1991 he was arrested by Yugoslav authorities for “activities against the state” and briefly imprisoned, shortly after his father had also been released after 14 years as a political prisoner. In 1992 he emigrated to Sweden, where he helped organize the Albanian diaspora to raise funds for the KLA’s war effort. In 1998 he returned to Kosovo with his younger brother and joined the KLA, fighting in the Battle of Košare, earning the Nom de guerre “Commander Bardhi”. After the war he joined the Kosovo Protection Corps, although he was reportedly dismissed for non-conformist behavior. He is married with five children.

== Political and public career ==
He served as municipal Director of Agriculture in Deçan as reported in January 2018. As Deputy Chairman of the OVL‑UÇK, he represented veterans in public debates and negotiations. He gave frequent interviews on Kosovar TV, commenting on delayed KLA prosecutions.

== Legal issues ==
On 25 September 2020, EULEX officers arrested Haradinaj in Pristina at the request of the Kosovo Specialist Chambers Prosecutor, accusing him of publicly revealing confidential case information. The indictment alleged that between 7 and 25 September 2020, Haradinaj and Gucati held press conferences and disseminated Specialist Chambers documents (including the identities of protected witnesses) in violation of court rules.

The trial, held at the Hague-based Kosovo Specialist Chambers, concluded on 18 May 2022. The Trial Panel found Haradinaj guilty on four of six charges: two counts of obstructing official persons in the performance of duties, one count of intimidation during proceedings, and two counts of violating court secrecy by revealing information and witness identities. The court sentenced him to four and a half years in prison with credit for time already served In June 2023, the Constitutional Court dismissed his rights complaint. Haradinaj appealed the verdict. On 2 February 2023, the Kosovo Specialist Chambers Appeals Panel largely upheld the convictions but vacated one count (one of the obstruction charges), reducing his sentence to four years and three months. In June 2023 Haradinaj applied to the Kosovo Specialist Chambers Constitutional Court (Chamber of Appeals) challenging his trial, but on 31 May 2024 the Court rejected his petition, finding no violation of rights. Following the appeals decision, the Kosovo Specialist Chambers President (Judge Rolando Rondelli Trendafilova) reviewed their sentences. Under Kosovo law and the court’s procedures, Haradinaj and Gucati were conditionally released in late 2023. Haradinaj was formally released on 14 December 2023 under specified conditions. His confiscated items were returned.

== Public controversies and statements ==
Nasim Haradinaj has generated controversy through numerous public remarks. For example, in December 2017 Haradinaj caused outrage by calling Kosovo’s unsolved post-war political murders “a great thing” because the victims had been members of the rival LDK party, prompting condemnation by political leaders including Prime Minister Ramush Haradinaj, who called such language “reprehensible” and urged all parties to denounce it. Haradinaj refused to apologize, claiming he was merely stating his opinion.

Haradinaj has also publicly criticized Kosovo officials. In 2025 he criticized Prime Minister Albin Kurti over Kurti’s refusal to visit former KLA leaders jailed in The Hague.Albin Kurti stated that too much paperwork prevented the visit; Haradinaj responded that he would go “even if 2,000 pages” needed to be filled, calling Kurti’s excuse “insulting” to the veterans. He contrasted this with the fact that other Balkan leaders (like Albania’s Edi Rama) had visited the prisoners as a gesture of solidarity.
