= Agim Bahtiri =

Kosovar politician (born 1960)

Mayor of South Mitrovica
- In office November 2013 – 2017
- Preceded by: Avni Kastrati

Mayor of South Mitrovica (re-elected)
- In office 2017 – 7 December 2021
- Succeeded by: Bedri Hamza

Deputy of the Assembly of Kosovo
- Incumbent
- Assumed office 14 February 2021

Personal details
- Born: 15 March 1960 (age 66) Gushac, SAP Kosovo, SFR Yugoslavia (present-day Kosovo)
- Party: New Kosovo Alliance (2013–2019); Vetëvendosje (2019–present)
- Children: 6
- Occupation: Entrepreneur; Politician

Agim Bahtiri (born 15 March 1960) is a Kosovar politician and entrepreneur who has served as mayor of South Mitrovica for two terms and as a member of the Assembly of Kosovo.
