= Battle of Lođa =

1998 battle of the Kosovo War

- Part of the Kosovo War
Date	First Battle: 6–17 July 1998; Second Battle: 10–17 August 1998
Location	Loxhë, near Peja, FR Yugoslavia
Result	First Battle: KLA and FARK victory; Second Battle: Yugoslav victory; 284 houses and mosque are destroyed by the Serbian Police

Belligerents
Kosovo Liberation Army; Armed Forces of the Republic of Kosova	(Federal Republic of Yugoslavia) FR Yugoslavia

Commanders and leaders
Tahir Zemaj; Sali Çekaj; Nazif Ramabaja	(Federal Republic of Yugoslavia) Nebojša Pavković; (Federal Republic of Yugoslavia) Srđan Perović (executed); (Federal Republic of Yugoslavia) Mirko Radunović †; (Federal Republic of Yugoslavia) Dejan Prelević †; (Federal Republic of Yugoslavia) Milorad Ulemek (second battle)

Units involved
Dukagjin Operational Zone; 131st “Jusuf Gërvalla” Brigade; Village defense group	Ministry of Internal Affairs; Peć SUP; Special Operations Unit (second battle); Yugoslav Army

Casualties and losses
4 killed, 13 wounded	(Federal Republic of Yugoslavia) 4 killed, 8 wounded (Federal Republic of Yugoslavia) 1 armored vehicle destroyed
- 2 civilians killed, 25 wounded

The Battle of Lođa (Serbian: Boj na Lođi, Serbian Cyrillic: Бој на лођи, Albanian: Beteja e Logjës) was fought during the Kosovo War in the village of Loxhë first on 6-12 July 1998 and again later on 10-17 August 1998. The battle was fought between the Yugoslav Army against the Kosovo Liberation Army (KLA) and the Armed Forces of the Republic of Kosova (FARK). The first battle was an operation launched to counterattack the Albanian rebels after two Yugoslav policemen patrolling the area had been killed. The first battle ended in an KLA victory, while the second operation ended in a Yugoslav victory. All of the village's 284 houses and mosque were destroyed by the Serbian Police with bulldozers.

== Background ==
Following World War II, Kosovo was given the status of an autonomous province within the Socialist Republic of Serbia, one of six constitutional republics of the Socialist Federal Republic of Yugoslavia. After the death of Yugoslavia's long-time leader (Josip Broz Tito) in 1980, Yugoslavia's political system began to unravel. In 1989, Belgrade revoked Kosovo's autonomy. Kosovo, a province inhabited predominantly by ethnic Albanians, was of great historical and cultural significance to Serbs, who had formed a majority there before the mid-19th century, but by 1990 represented only about 10 percent of the population. Alarmed by their dwindling numbers, the province's Serbs began to fear that they were being "squeezed out" by the Albanians, and ethnic tensions worsened. As soon as Kosovo's autonomy was abolished, a minority government run by Serbs and Montenegrins was appointed by Serbian President Slobodan Milošević to oversee the province, enforced by thousands of heavily armed paramilitaries from Serbia-proper. Albanian culture was systematically repressed and hundreds of thousands of Albanians working in state-owned companies lost their jobs.

In 1996, a group of Albanian nationalists calling themselves the Kosovo Liberation Army (KLA) began attacking the Yugoslav Army (Serbo-Croatian: Vojska Jugoslavije; VJ) and the Serbian Ministry of Internal Affairs (Serbo-Croatian: Ministarstvo unutrašnjih poslova; MUP) in Kosovo. Their goal was to separate the province from the rest of Yugoslavia, which following the separation of Slovenia, Croatia, Macedonia and Bosnia-Herzegovina in 1991–92, was just a rump federation consisting of Serbia and Montenegro. At first, the KLA carried out hit-and-run attacks (31 in 1996, 55 in 1997, and 66 in January and February 1998 alone). It quickly gained popularity among young Kosovo Albanians, many of whom rejected the non-violent resistance to Yugoslav authorities advocated by the politician Ibrahim Rugova and favoured a more aggressive approach. The organization received a significant boost in 1997, when an armed uprising in neighbouring Albania led to thousands of weapons from the Albanian Army's depots being looted. Many of these weapons ended up in the hands of the KLA. The KLA also received substantial funds from its involvement in the drug trade.

The KLA's popularity skyrocketed after the VJ and MUP attacked the compound of KLA leader Adem Jashari in March 1998, killing him, his closest associates and most of his family. The attack prompted thousands of young Kosovo Albanians to join the ranks of the KLA, fueling the Kosovar uprising that eventually erupted in the spring of 1998.

Loxha is a village in western Kosovo. It is situated in the immediate vicinity of Peja, east of the Prizren-Pejë highway.

== First Battle ==
On 6 July, the KLA launched attacks on multiple Kosovo Serb families living in Loxhë, prompting a response from the Ministry of Internal Affairs (MUP) in Pejë. A special police force platoon was deployed in the village to evacuate the Vujošević family. Intense fighting broke out, and the police platoon managed to reach the Vujošević home. Once they reached the home, they were informed that two more families outside of Loxhë needed to be evacuated. The police reached the other families and evacuated them. The police convoy was returning to Pejë, passing through Loxhë. While the convoy was leaving, the KLA regrouped and launched an attack on the convoy. The convoy was hit by a rocket-propelled grenade, destroying an armored vehicle. Sergeants Mirko Radunović and Dejan Prelević were killed, and four others were severely wounded. During the fighting, a police vehicle stayed behind to fight off the militants from the rear, while the rest of the convoy retreated. The rear squad planned to breakthrough through Goraždevac on foot, about 300 to 400 metres away from their position. The squad managed to escape Loxhë and move forward with the extraction towards Goraždevac. They encountered five or six militants from behind a house, wearing camouflage police uniforms, who beckoned for the squad to come. Srđan Perović approached and was hit, then Milo Rajković was shot in the head. The rest of the squad fell back to a nearby cornfield and managed to escape. According to contemporary reports, 3–5 policemen were killed and 4–15 were wounded, while four militants were killed and 13 were wounded during the fighting. The news website Kosovo Online cites four policemen killed and eight wounded, including a police captain who was tortured for days by his KLA captors before succumbing to his injuries. The Democratic League of Kosovo (LDK) information commissioner in Deçan reported that KLA and FARK units repelled the Yugoslav attack on Loxhë. Up until 12 July, there had been fighting in the area of Loxhë. The KLA stated that they remained in control of the village. Shell cases and tree branches were strewn over the road, possibly concealing landmines. Armed villagers at the barricade alongside the KLA stated that there was an attack on 11 July. Yugoslav forces attacked from three sides, using armored vehicles and infantry. Mortar attacks resulted in the deaths of two KLA militants. Serb sources in Pejë confirmed on Saturday that police had attacked the village in an attempt to find two policemen missing in a previous operation. The police regained control of a road leading to a Serb village cut off by fighting but failed to find the missing policemen. According to the Kosovo Information Centre, the police fired rockets at Loxhë during the attack, in which they said one civilian died and three others wounded. Reporters were not permitted to enter Loxhë to see the reported damage.
