= Agim Ramadani =

Kosovar military commander (1963–1999)

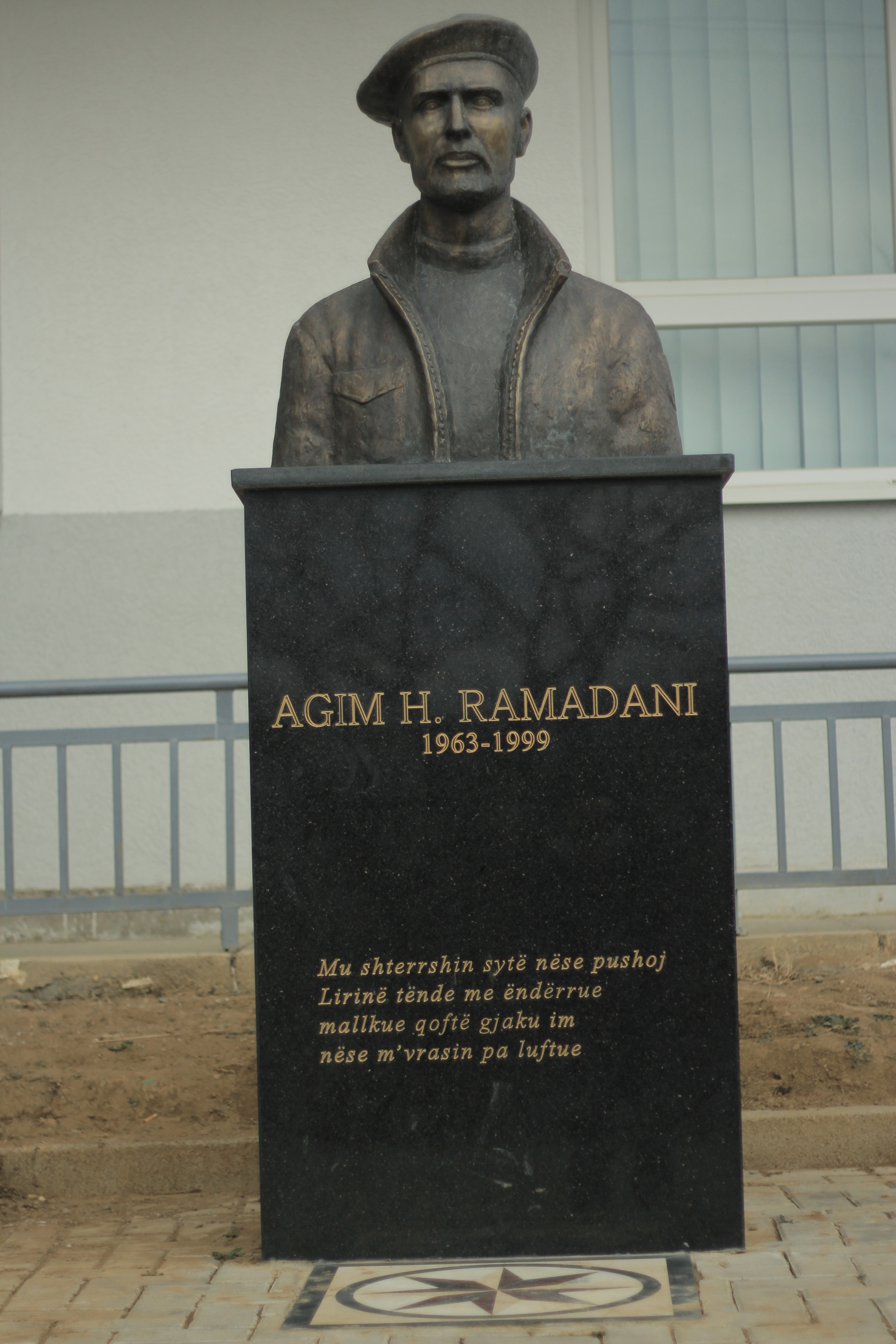
- Statue of Agim Ramadani in Zhegër, Kosovo
- Born: 3 May 1963; Žegra, Gjilan, AP Kosovo, SFR Yugoslavia (now Kosovo)
- Died: 11 April 1999 (aged 35); Košare, Đakovica, Kosovo, FR Yugoslavia (now Kosovo)
- Military career
- Allegiance: Kosova
- Branch: Armed Forces of the Republic of Kosova; Kosovo Liberation Army
- Rank: Military Commander
- Nickname: "Katana"
- Unit: 138th Brigade
- Conflicts: Kosovo War: Battle of Junik; Battle of Opljaz; Operation Eagle; Gjeravica attacks; Yugoslav offensive in Kosovo (1998); Operation Fenix; Battle of Košare †
- Awards: Hero of Kosovo (posthumously)

Agim Ramadani (Note: Serbian Cyrillic: Агим Рамадани) (3 May 1963 – 11 April 1999) also known with nickname "Katana", was an Albanian commander of the Kosovo Liberation Army (KLA), an ethnic Albanian paramilitary organization that sought the independence of Kosovo from Yugoslavia. He was killed in action during the Battle of Košare. After the war, he was declared a Hero of Kosovo.

== Biography ==
Agim Ramadani was born on 3 May 1963 in the village of Zhegër located in the Karadak Highlands in the municipality of Gjilan in AP Kosovo. His family originally hails from Depce near Preševo and belongs to the Berisha tribe. He studied at the higher technical school in Gnjilane in 1980, and the Military Academy for communications in Zagreb, SR Croatia.

In 1998 Ramadani left Switzerland, where his wife and three children lived, and joined the Kosovo Liberation Army (KLA). He died at the Battle of Košare.

== Kosovo War ==
=== Early stage ===
On the outbreak of the Kosovo War, Ramadani joined the Kosovo Liberation Army, where he immediately became a commander in the Operational Zone of Dukagjin.

=== Gjocaj and Jasiq ===
On 28 July 1998 Ramadani came to reinforce the defense of the villages Gjocaj and Jasiq. Yugoslav troops attacked the villages from the military outpost of Kosharë to take the two strategic points. The attack failed, resulting in three VJ soldiers as well as a VJ Major killed, while the KLA under Ramadani's command suffered three casualties.

=== Battle of Opljaz ===
On 9 August 1998 in the village of Oplazë (Serbian: Опљаз, romanized: Opljaz), forces under Ramadani's command successfully defeated Yugoslav forces killing 17–20 Soldiers as well as two Army officers.

=== Operation Eagle ===
On 15 August 1998 Ramadani initiated "Operation Eagle," which involved attacking the Zhillovic police station.

=== Gjeravica raid ===
Agim Ramadani's next operation against Yugoslav forces happened on a Yugoslav Military Outpost and Watchtower near the Gjeravica Mountain on 15 September 1998. 40 Serbian soldiers were killed and 20 wounded.

=== Operation Fenix ===
In his next Operation codenamed "Operation Fenix" on 30 September 1998 he attacked Yugoslav Army positions near the Košare Military Base. Again the Operation ended with a victory for Ramadani's brigade, killing 6 Yugoslav soldiers, wounding another 6, destroying 1 Tank and 1 APC.

=== Battle of Košare ===
On 9 April 1999, Ramadani along with 136 soldiers under his command crossed the Albanian-Yugoslav border near Košare and attacked Yugoslav Forces numbering 300 soldiers, starting the bloodiest Battle in the entire Kosovo War. The first day of the fighting lasted the whole day and ended with a victory for Ramadani's forces, forcing the Yugoslav soldiers to retreat to the Košare base. The heavy fighting left 4 KLA soldiers and 23 Yugoslav soldiers dead.

== Death ==
The death of Agim Ramadani has been a source of speculation. The account of his death reported by the KLA was that he had been killed in a surprise attack by Serbian forces during the Battle of Košare. American journalist James Ridgeway speculates that his death was connected to a string of assassinations of prominent KLA and Armed Forces of Kosova (FARK) leaders that link to Hashim Thaçi. Isni Berisha, a former KLA soldier who witnessed Ramadani's death said he was killed in a surprise attack by Serbs.

=== Plans prior to his death ===
In 1997, Agim Ramadani planned an attack on Dubrava Prison to free Albanian prisoners held by Yugoslavia. Ramadani insisted he needed 20 people, a truck, and a tractor for weapons. The plan was abandoned as the situation in Kosovo shifted with the attack on Prekaz. Ramadani later suspected someone had leaked their intentions after the prisoners were suddenly relocated from Dubrava.

Prior to his death, he also reportedly had plans to fight in his home region of Karadak and had asked Ahmet Krasniqi, leader of the FARK, for permission to begin his own operations in Karadak. However, Ahmet Krasniqi refused.

Later, just before his death during the Battle of Košare, Ramadani stated: "If my fate allows me to capture Junik, I will never stay in Dukagjin again, but I will go and fight in my Karadak. However, I owe Junik because I left against my will."

== Legacy ==
Agim is regarded as an Albanian hero. A main street in Pristina is named after him.

== Sources ==
- John Oppenheim; Willem-Jan van der Wolf; Global Law Association (1997). Global war crimes tribunal collection. Global Law Association.
