= Bujar Bukoshi =

Kosovar politician (1947–2025)

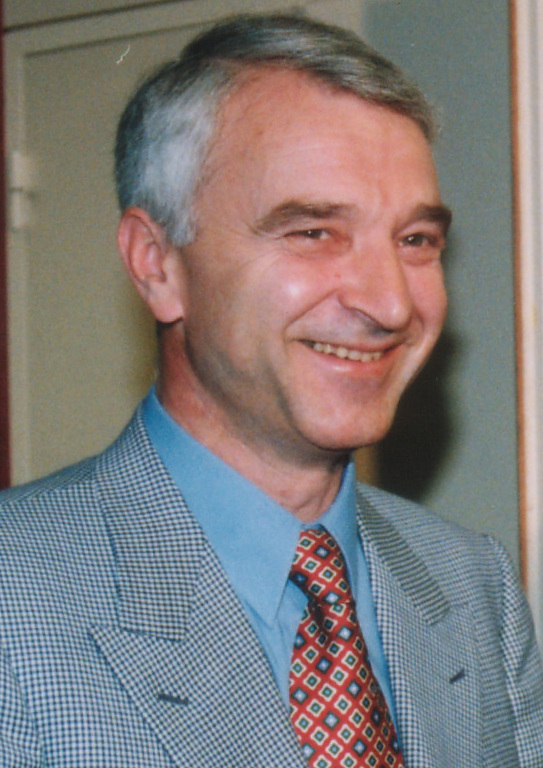
- Bukoshi in 1994

Prime Minister of Kosovo
- In office 5 October 1991 – 1 February 2000
- Preceded by: Jusuf Zejnullahu
- Succeeded by: Hashim Thaçi

Personal details
- Born: 13 May 1947 Suharekë, AR Kosovo and Metohija, FPR Yugoslavia
- Died: 10 June 2025 (aged 78) Pristina, Kosovo
- Party: Democratic League of Kosovo
- Spouse: Zana Bukoshi
- Children: 3
- Education: University of Belgrade (M.D.)
- Occupation: Urologist; politician

Bujar Bukoshi (13 May 1947 – 10 June 2025) was a Kosovar politician who served as the prime minister of the Republic of Kosova from 1991 to 2000. He served as the Minister of Healthcare in Kosovo.

== Life and career ==
Bukoshi was born in Suva Reka, SAP Kosovo, FPR Yugoslavia on 13 May 1947. He graduated from the University of Belgrade's Medical School. Bukoshi was one of the founders of the Democratic League of Kosovo and was elected leader of the party. During the regime of Slobodan Milošević, Bukoshi went into exile, where he helped raised funds for parallel Kosovar government institutions. He became prime minister of Kosovo's government in exile from 1991 to 1999. He was the deputy prime minister of Kosovo in the second Thaçi cabinet from 2011 to 2014.

Bukoshi was married to Zana and had three children. He died in Pristina, Kosovo on 10 June 2025, at the age of 78.
