= Operation Fenix =

1998 military operation of the Kosovo War

- Part of the Kosovo War
Date	30 September 1998
Location	Albanian-Yugoslav border
Result	KLA victory

Belligerents
Kosovo Liberation Army	(Federal Republic of Yugoslavia) FR Yugoslavia

Commanders and leaders
Agim Ramadani; Rrustem Berisha; Nasim Haradinaj; Xhezair Shaqiri; Anton Quni	(Federal Republic of Yugoslavia) Vidoje Kovačević (Federal Republic of Yugoslavia) Dragutin Dimćevski

Units involved
"KOBRA" unit from the 3rd Operative Group GO-3 (later renamed to 138th Brigade "Agim Ramadani")	Yugoslav Army; Priština Corps; 549th Motorized Brigade; 53rd Border Battalion; "Žaoka" Reconnaissance Company

Strength
30 soldiers	(Federal Republic of Yugoslavia) 20 soldiers (Federal Republic of Yugoslavia) 1 tank (Federal Republic of Yugoslavia) 2 APC (Federal Republic of Yugoslavia) 2 helicopters

Casualties and losses
None	(Federal Republic of Yugoslavia) 6 killed (Federal Republic of Yugoslavia) 6 wounded (Federal Republic of Yugoslavia) 1 Pinzgauer damaged (Federal Republic of Yugoslavia) 1 BOV destroyed

Operation Fenix was an operation launched by militants of the KLA's "Kobra" unit, which conducted two ambushes out of Albanian territory near the border outpost of Koshare on Yugoslav forces. Six Yugoslav Army personnel were killed. The KLA suffered no casualties, and captured Yugoslav ammunition, equipment and looted the dead soldiers.

== Background ==
In 1989, Belgrade abolished self-rule in Serbia's two autonomous provinces, Vojvodina and Kosovo. Kosovo, a province inhabited predominantly by ethnic Albanians, was of great historical and cultural significance to Serbs. Prior to the mid-19th century they had formed a majority in the province, but by 1990 represented only about 10 percent of the population. Alarmed by their dwindling numbers, the province's Serbs began to fear they were being "squeezed out" by the Albanians, with whom ethnic tensions had been brewing since the early 1980s. As soon as Kosovo's autonomy was abolished, a minority government run by Serbs and Montenegrins was appointed by Serbian President Slobodan Milošević to oversee the province, enforced by thousands of heavily armed paramilitaries from Serbia-proper. Albanian culture was systematically repressed and hundreds of thousands of Albanians working in state-owned companies lost their jobs.

In 1995, a ragtag group of Albanian nationalists calling themselves the Kosovo Liberation Army (KLA) began attacking the Yugoslav Army (Serbo-Croatian Latin: Vojska Jugoslavije; VJ) and the Serbian Ministry of Internal Affairs (Serbo-Croatian Latin: Ministarstvo unutrašnjih poslova; MUP) in Kosovo. Their goal was to separate the province from the rest of Yugoslavia, which following the separation of Slovenia, Croatia, Macedonia and Bosnia-Herzegovina in 1991–92, became a rump federation made up of Serbia and Montenegro. At first the KLA carried out hit-and-run attacks: 31 in 1996, 55 in 1997, and 66 in January and February 1998 alone. The group quickly gained popularity among young Kosovo Albanians, many of whom favored a more aggressive approach and rejected the non-violent resistance of politician Ibrahim Rugova. It received a significant boost in 1997 when civil unrest in neighboring Albania led to thousands of weapons from the Albanian Army's depots being looted. Many of these weapons ended up in the hands of the KLA. The group's popularity skyrocketed after the VJ and MUP attacked the compound of KLA leader Adem Jashari in March 1998, killing him, his closest associates and most of his extended family. The attack motivated thousands of young Kosovo Albanians to join the KLA, fueling the Kosovar uprising that eventually erupted in the spring of 1998.

== Events ==
The men, who were part of the KLA's "Cobra" unit, first prepared for the ambush by laying anti tank mines. Later, a Yugoslav tank came and one of the anti tank mines detonated. The blast killed one soldier and injured four others. A Yugoslav army helicopter was sent out to pick up the surviving soldiers, but it was fired upon by the KLA. A second attack happened shortly after, this time close to the Koshare border outpost. The KLA fighters ambushed a Yugoslav army vehicle. They opened fire upon the vehicle and threw hand grenades at it, killing five Yugoslav soldiers and wounding two more. They then collected ammunition and equipment from the vehicle and soldiers and looted the Yugoslav soldiers of their personal belongings. The KLA then opened fire to another helicopter which came to evacuate the wounded.

== Aftermath ==
The higher court in the southern Serbian city of Niš on February 17, 2016, found Sicer Maloku, Gashi Xhafer, Demush Gacaferi, Deme Maloku, Agron Isufi, Anton Cuni, Rabit Alija and Rrustem Berisha guilty of acts of terrorism and ordered each of them to be jailed for 15 years for their involvement in two attacks on Yugoslav Army troops in Koshare on the same day in 1998. Rrustem Berisha is currently a Kosovar politician and military officer. He responded to the conviction by saying this; “We had uniforms. We were soldiers and we fought against soldiers. They [the Yugoslav Army] killed civilians including elderly people, children and women." Former Prime Minister of Kosovo Isa Mustafa said that a Serbian court's decision to convict eight former Kosovo Liberation Army fighters of killing Yugoslav Army troops in September 1998 was a farce. Mustafa said that courts in Serbia have no right to judge Kosovo's citizens and even less to try former KLA fighters who were involved in what he called a liberation war and respected the laws and customs of warfare.

None of the former KLA militants have served the sentence they were given.
