= 1991 Kosovan independence referendum =

- 26–30 September 1991

Results
| Choice | Votes | % |
|---|---|---|
| Yes | 913,705 | 99.98% |
| No | 164 | 0.02% |
| Valid votes | 913,869 | 99.90% |
| Invalid or blank votes | 933 | 0.10% |
| Total votes | 914,802 | 100.00% |
| Registered voters/turnout | 1,051,357 | 87.01% |

An independence referendum was held in Kosovo, then known as the Socialist Autonomous Province of Kosovo between 26 and 30 September 1991. The Provincial Assembly, which had been dissolved in 1989 by Serbian authorities but whose Albanian members continued to meet underground, declared the Republic of Kosova a sovereign and independent state on 22 September 1991. Over 99% of voters voted in favour of independence, with a turnout of 87%. The referendum was boycotted by Serbs living in the region, who comprised around 10% of the population.

== Background ==
In order to pass, the referendum required a turnout of at least 66.7% and at least half of those voting in favour.

== Results ==
| Choice | Votes | % |
|---|---|---|
| For | 913,705 | 99.98 |
| Against | 164 | 0.02 |
| Total | 913,869 | 100.00 |
| Valid votes | 913,869 | 99.90 |
| Invalid/blank votes | 933 | 0.10 |
| Total votes | 914,802 | 100.00 |
| Registered voters/turnout | 1,051,357 | 87.01 |
Source: Direct Democracy

== Recognition ==
The only country who recognised the Republic of Kosova was Albania, with a resolution recognizing the country passed in the Parliament of Albania on 21 October 1991.

== See also ==
- 2008 Kosovo declaration of independence
- 2012 North Kosovo referendum
