= Jusuf Zejnullahu =

Kosovar politician

Jusuf Zejnullahu (born 9 February 1944) is a former Kosovar politician.

== Background and early life ==
Zejnullahu was born in Democratic Federal Yugoslavia. He was active in Kosovo politics throughout the 1980s, and occupied a number of important economic positions within the SAP Kosovo autonomic province and Yugoslavia as a whole. On 14 April 1989 he was elected a member of the Central Committee and the Presidency of the 13th Congress of the League of Communists of Yugoslavia from Kosovo.

== Prime Minister of Kosovo ==
On 4 December 1989 Zejnullahu was elected Prime Minister (Chairman of the Executive Council) of the Socialist Autonomous Province of Kosovo, then part of Socialist Federal Republic of Yugoslavia.

On 3 April 1990 he and a number of other ethnic Albanian members of the Provincial Executive Council, including one of the two vice-premiers, offered their resignations, in protest at Slobodan Milošević’s measures in the region, and the handling of the separatist unrest by the local Communist Party of Kosovo.

At the 23 May session the Kosovo Assembly rejected these resignations, and the officials continued in their posts.

=== Declaration of Secession ===
Zejnullahu was later involved in the declaration of secession of July 2, 1990, after which Kosovo's Assembly and Executive Council were dissolved. He was later designated Prime Minister-in-exile of Kosovo's shadow provincial government, and arrested for his pro-independence activities.

== Emigration to the United States ==
In 1999 he emigrated to the United States, where he remains.
