= Koshare, Gjakova =

Koshare Кошаре (Košare)
- Village
- Location within Kosovo
- Coordinates: 42°27′0.22″N 20°12′12.64″E
- Country: Kosovo
- District: Gjakova
- Municipality: Gjakova
- Elevation: 390 m (1,280 ft)

Population (2024)
  - Total: 0
- Time zone: UTC+1 (Central European Time)
  - Summer (DST): UTC+2 (CEST)

Koshare (Serbian: Кошаре/Košare) (Albanian: Koshare) is a village in the District of Gjakova, Kosovo. It is located within the historical ethnographic region of the Gjakova Highlands.

== History ==
Koshare was the sight of the 1999 Battle of Košare between the KLA supported by NATO on one side and the Armed Forces of the Federal Republic of Yugoslavia on the other.
