= Battle of Košare =

1999 battle of the Kosovo War

- Part of the Kosovo War
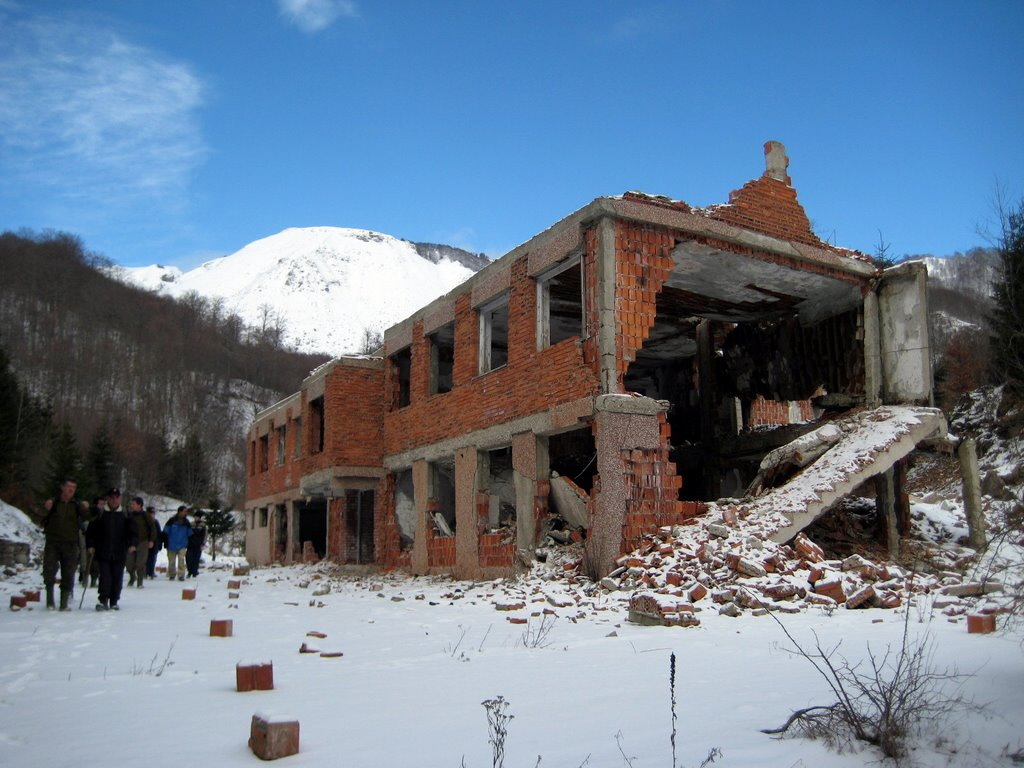
- Košare outpost, destroyed during the Kosovo War
| Date | 9 April – 10 June 1999 (2 months and 1 day) |
| Location | Košare 42°27′0.22″N 20°12′12.64″E |

Belligerents
| Kosovo Liberation Army; Albania; NATO | (Federal Republic of Yugoslavia) Yugoslav Army |

Commanders and leaders
| Agim Ramadani †; Sali Çekaj †; Anton Quni; Rrustem Berisha; Hisen Berisha (Albania) Kudusi Lama (NATO) Wesley Clark | (Federal Republic of Yugoslavia) Božidar Delić (Federal Republic of Yugoslavia) Dragan Živanović (Federal Republic of Yugoslavia) Duško Šljivančanin (Federal Republic of Yugoslavia) Dragutin Dimčevski (Federal Republic of Yugoslavia) Ljubinko Đurković (Federal Republic of Yugoslavia) Vidoje Kovačević |

Units involved
| 3rd Operative Group (Note: GO-3, later renamed to 138th Brigade "Agim Ramadani") | (Federal Republic of Yugoslavia) Priština Corps Units 549th Motorized Brigade (Federal Republic of Yugoslavia) 53rd Border Battalion (Federal Republic of Yugoslavia) 2nd Battalion of the 125th Motorized Brigade (Federal Republic of Yugoslavia) 63rd Parachute Brigade |

Strength
| 136–156 men (initial) up to 2,500 men (May) | (Federal Republic of Yugoslavia) 300 men (initial) (Federal Republic of Yugoslavia) 2,500 (May) |

Casualties and losses
| 114 killed (7 by NATO friendly fire; (Note: PBS said after the war that 67 people were reportedly killed in the NATO air-strike.) 3 foreign volunteers); 423 wounded | (Federal Republic of Yugoslavia) 108 killed (16 by NATO; 1 foreign volunteer) |
- Location of Košare in Kosovo

The Battle of Košare (Serbian: Битка на Кошарама, romanized: Bitka na Košarama; Albanian: Beteja e Kosharës) was fought during the Kosovo War between the forces of FR Yugoslavia and the Kosovo Liberation Army (KLA), the latter supported by the NATO air forces and Albanian Army. The battle was fought around Košare on the border between FR Yugoslavia and Albania from 9 April 1999 until 10 June 1999 during the NATO bombing of FR Yugoslavia.

KLA insurgents managed to take the Košare border outpost and a number of surrounding border areas following a massive artillery barrage by the Albanian Army and NATO airstrikes of Yugoslav strategic sites, but were unable to make further advances. The attack was largely coordinated by the local Albanian commander, General Lama, who was in direct contact with General Clark. Tactical initiatives on the ground were entrusted to local KLA commanders who took part in the attack.

== Background ==
According to U.S. intelligence and military officials, NATO provided air support to the KLA, while NATO and the Clinton administration denied providing direct support to the KLA, with one Western official sustaining this point by mentioning a hypothetical KLA military dictatorship being established in Kosovo. The KLA was also supported by artillery from the Albanian Army.

== Timeline ==
=== 9–13 April: KLA offensive ===
On 9 April 1999, at 03:00, an artillery barrage began from the Albanian side of the border, aimed in the direction of the Košare military outpost, which was occupied by the Yugoslav Army, in what became one of the bloodiest battles of the Kosovo War. The Albanians attacked in three directions, the first was towards Rrasa e Koshares, the second was towards the well-defended Košare outpost and the third was towards Maja Glava. Approximately 136 KLA soldiers reached the border and attacked Yugoslav positions. At that time less than 200 members of the Yugoslav Army were stationed at the front line. Bloody fighting ensued and lasted the whole day with 4 dead and 1 wounded on the Albanian side and 23 dead on the Yugoslav side. Later, the KLA seized the peak of Rrasa e Koshares and immediately began entrenching themselves. Serbian reports claimed that the KLA insurgents were assisted by British, French, German and Italian special forces.

The battle continued until the next morning. Then, with artillery support, the KLA took Maja Glava and continued to bombard the Košare Outpost, which resulted in the Yugoslav soldiers having to abandon their posts. At 19:00, members of the KLA entered the abandoned outpost. The CNN and the British BBC broadcast images of a large number of KLA militants taking the outpost.

Members of the Yugoslav Army retreated towards the second line of defense above the outpost, which was more defendable. The next day, Yugoslav reserve troops arrived to relieve the First Army. One group of KLA soldiers managed to cut the Yugoslav line of communications, and managed to destroy one BOV armoured personnel carrier. During the night, the KLA attacked the Yugoslav Army at Opljaz, trying to breakthrough the Yugoslav lines, but all of the attacks were unsuccessful and resulted in the Yugoslav Army inflicting heavy losses on the KLA insurgents. Meanwhile, the Yugoslavs managed to bring in their special forces and also a few artillery pieces.

On 13 April, the Yugoslav and Albanian armies clashed at the border near Krumë.

=== 14 April: Yugoslav counter-offensive on Maja Glava ===
Albanian Army and KLA artillery continued to shell the Yugoslav Army's positions from Maja Glava and Rrasa e Koshares. The Yugoslav Army Headquarters decided to launch a sudden attack and surprise the Albanians. On 14 April, Yugoslav troops attacked Maja Glava. The distance between the two enemy trenches wasn't longer than 50 meters. The Yugoslav Army was unable to take Maja Glava completely, but it prevented the Albanians' artillery from engaging them from their positions. The Maja Glava front was stabilized until the end of the war, without any changes on the lines. In April, there weren't any changes on the front lines at Rrasa e Koshares and both sides suffered heavy losses.

=== 26-27 April: KLA attack on Rrasa e Koshares ===
During the day, KLA commander Hisen Berisha organized an attack on Yugoslav positions. At dusk, the insurgents opened fire in the direction of the Yugoslavs, attempting to draw fire from their positions. Fierce fighting continued until the morning, with 7 dead on the Albanian side and 47 dead on the Yugoslav side.

=== 10–11 May: Yugoslav offensive on Rrasa e Koshares ===
May began with several unsuccessful attacks by the Yugoslav Army to take back the Košare outpost. The attacks were made unsuccessful because of the constant artillery fire aimed at their positions. On 6 May, the Yugoslav Army counterattacked at Rrasa e Koshares, in an effort to halt the artillery bombardment. A bloody skirmish ensued, but the Yugoslav Army did not manage to take Rrasa e Koshares. On 10 May, the Yugoslav Army sent two T-55 tanks to help stabilize the offensive on Rrasa e Koshares. When the tanks penetrated the KLA's lines, they advanced over 100 meters into insurgent-held territory, but the KLA still managed to retain control of Rrasa e Koshares. During the night of 10/11 May, NATO bombers dropped dozens of bombs on the Yugoslav troops who had attacked KLA positions around Rrasa e Koshares. At least in two of these instances NATO dropped cluster bombs on Yugoslav army troops. In these attacks, NATO killed eight Yugoslav soldiers and one officer and managed to wound over 40. The KLA seized the opportunity to attack and fought the Yugoslav soldiers out of their positions and forced them back.

=== 19–20 May: KLA attack near Junik ===
On 19 or 20 May, the KLA attacked a Yugoslav Special Forces' position near Junik. The KLA claimed to have managed to kill 14 Yugoslav Special Forces members after bitter fighting, whilst they suffered no losses. One of the killed was Russian citizen Vitaly Glebovich Bulakh. Documents retrieved from Bulakh's body showed he was an officer within the Russian Army, while Moscow confirmed that there was an officer by the same name who had been discharged from the Russian Army due to medical conditions with the name that the KLA had provided. The KLA presented this as evidence of Russian involvement in the war and sent a strong letter of protest to the Russian embassy in Tirana, demanding 5,000 firearms with ammunition as ransom for the retrieval of the body. Yugoslavia reported Bulakh was killed while fighting as a volunteer.

On 19 May, The Associated Press reported that the KLA began digging in positions following fighting. The KLA claims it has taken control of 2 kilometres of land from Yugoslav-controlled areas in the days prior. They have destroyed several Yugoslav artillery positions and killed a Yugoslav officer and three soldiers. The border area the KLA controls is 17 kilometres long and 9 to 10 kilometres deep.

=== 22 May: NATO friendly fire on Košare Outpost ===
On 22 May, NATO aircraft mistakenly bombed KLA positions. Some KLA commanders would later say that this was intentional to stop the KLA from making further gains. According to the KLA, 7 of their fighters were killed and 27 wounded in the strike. After the war, PBS said that 6-7 people were reported as having died in the raid.

== Aftermath ==
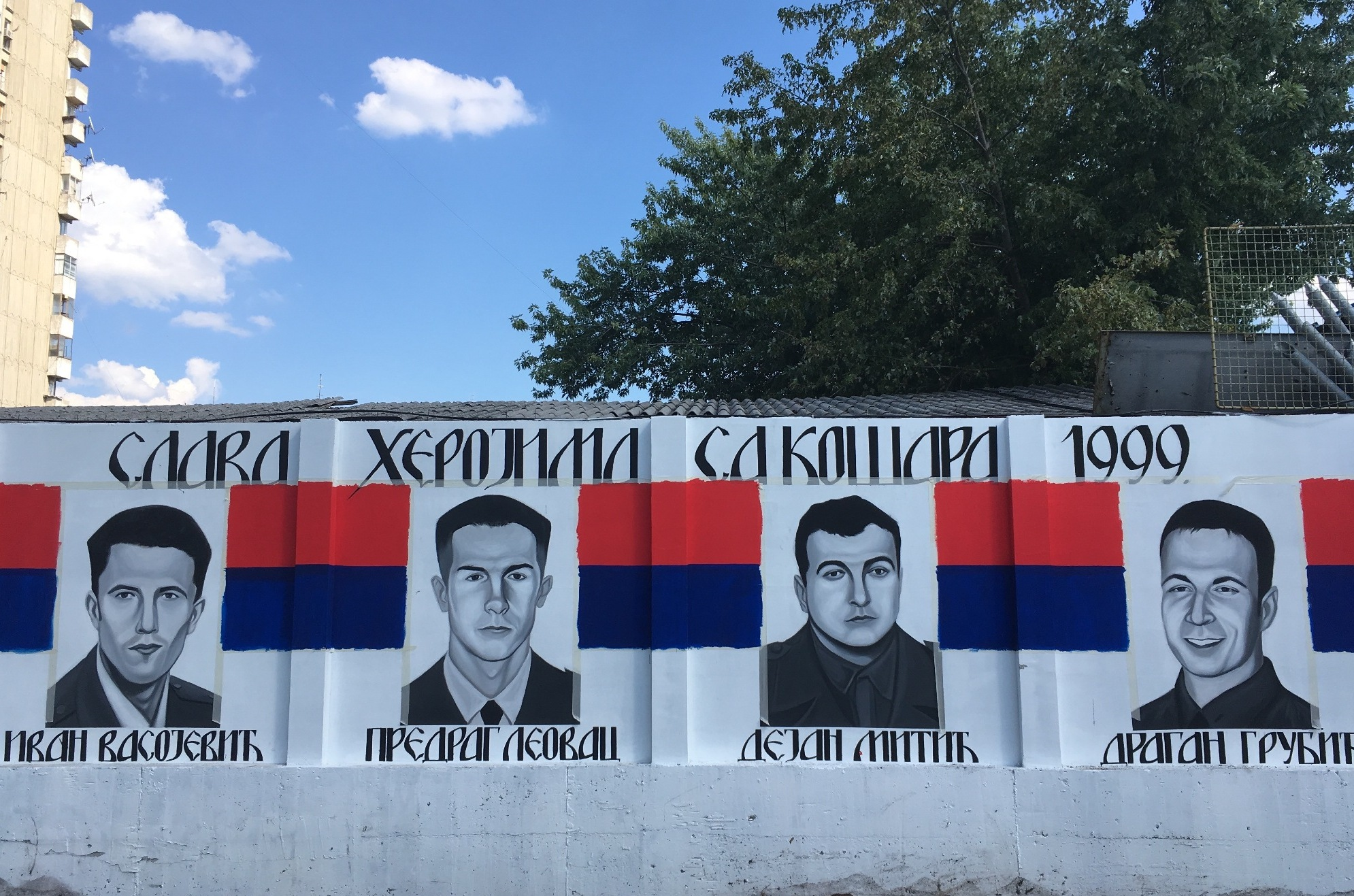
A mural honoring the fallen soldiers of the Battle of Košare in Niš

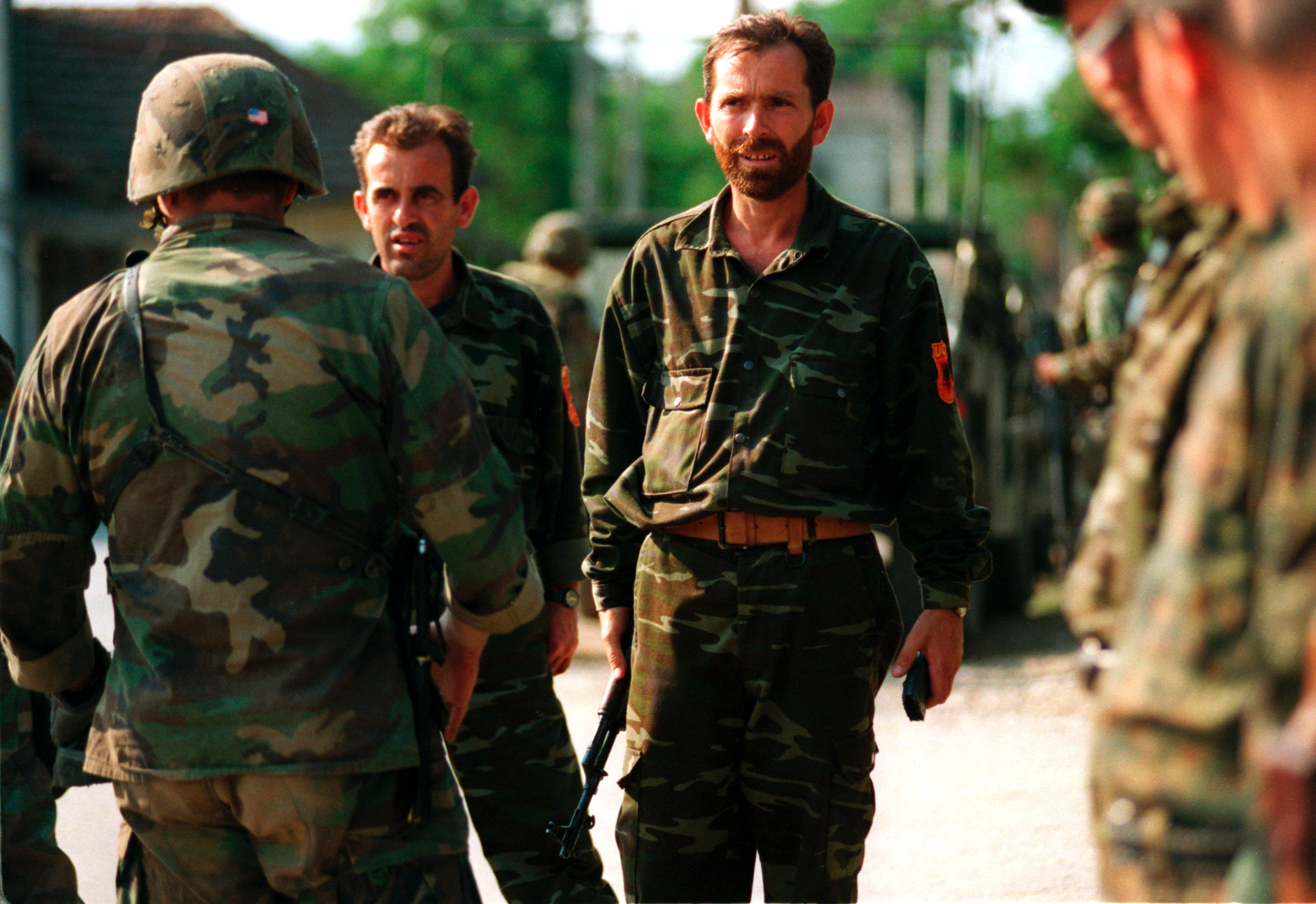
KLA members waiting to turn in their weapons to U.S. Marines, 30 June 1999.

Although the Yugoslav Army was unable to reclaim the border outpost at Košare, the KLA never broke out of this small bridgehead and was ultimately unsuccessful at securing a corridor from Albania through this route. It was thought the KLA was unable to make further gains as they lacked heavy weapons after the Albanian Army withdrew its support. This would lead to the Battle of Paštrik in late May, where some thought the KLA was successful, while others thought they were unsuccessful or achieved minimal success. Despite managing to capture two villages near Peć and seizing large stretches of the border area northwest of Prizren, the KLA was not able to gain control of the Peć-Prizren highway and suffered heavy losses.

The Kosovo War lasted until 10 June. The Kumanovo Agreement was signed and the Yugoslav Army, paramilitaries and police-forces had to pull out of Kosovo. The KFOR entered Kosovo as a peacekeeping force. The KLA was, under the terms of the Kumanovo Treaty, disarmed and disbanded, however many of its members left Kosovo and joined Albanian organizations in the Insurgency in the Preševo Valley (Serbia) and Insurgency in the Republic of Macedonia.

== Legacy ==
Sali Çekaj and Agim Ramadani were posthumously decorated with Hero of Kosovo by Ibrahim Rugova on the 6th year anniversary of the battle.

In 2017 a boulevard in New Belgrade was named to Heroes of Košare Boulevard, a name that had been proposed by the citizens of Belgrade.

On 12 April 2020, Dragutin Dimčevski, deputy commander of the 53rd Border Battalion, was given the Order of the White Eagle by Serbian President Aleksandar Vučić for his service at Košare. The 53rd Border Battalion was the first unit to face off against the KLA in the Battle of Košare.

A Serbian feature film about the battle was set to begin filming in late June 2020.

On 9 April 2021, on the 22nd anniversary of the beginning of the battle, a memorial plaque dedicated to the Yugoslav Army fighters of the battle was unveiled in Niš, and a boulevard in the city was named the "Košare Heroes Boulevard".

== Sources ==
- Bahri Muharrem Gashi (2006). Kosharja altari i lirisë: dimensionet e luftës së Koshares dhe format e saj. Shtepia Botuese "Faik Konica". ISBN 9951061494.
- Smiljanić, Spasoje (2009). Agresija NATO: ratno vazduhoplovstvo i protivvazdušna odbrana u odbrani otadžbine. Spasoje Smiljanić. ISBN 978-86-912285-0-7.
- Nardulli, Bruce; Perry, Walter L.; Pirnie, Bruce R.; Gordin, John IV; McGinn, John G. (2002). Disjointed War: Military Operations in Kosovo, 1999. Rand Corporation. ISBN 978-0-8330-3231-7.
- Coercive Diplomacy of NATO in Kosovo. Cambridge Scholars Publishing. 2015. ISBN 978-1-4438-7668-1.
- Hockenos, Paul (2003). Homeland Calling: Exile Patriotism & the Balkan Wars. Cornell University Press. ISBN 0-8014-4158-7.
