= Republic of Kosova =

1991–2000 self-declared proto-state in southeast Europe

Republic of Kosova Republika e Kosovës
- 1991–2000
- Flag Coat of arms
- Anthem: Himni i Flamurit "Hymn to the Flag"
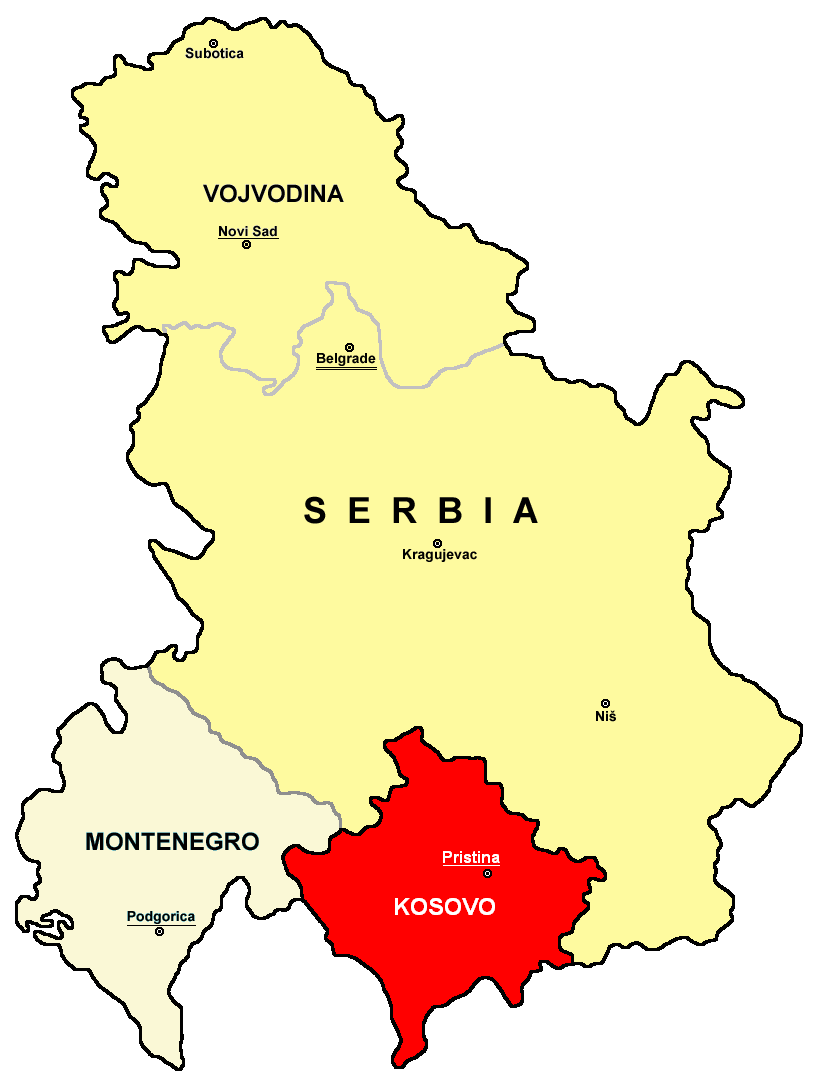
- Location of the Republic of Kosova in relation to the Federal Republic of Yugoslavia (1999)
- Capital: Pristina; 42°39′48″N 21°9′44″E
- Common languages: Albanian (official)
- Demonym: Kosovar or Kosovan
- Government: Unitary semi-presidential republic
- President
  - 1992–2000: Ibrahim Rugova
- Prime Minister
  - 1991–1991: Jusuf Zejnullahu
  - 1991–1999: Bujar Bukoshi
  - 1999–2000: Hashim Thaçi
- Legislature: Assembly
- Historical era: Yugoslav Wars
  - Declared: 22 September 1991
  - Independence referendum: 26–30 September 1991
  - General election: 24 May 1992
  - Kosovo insurgency: 1995–1998
  - Kosovo War: 1998–1999
  - Kumanovo Agreement: 9 June 1999
  - UNSC resolution 1244: 10 June 1999
  - JIAS recognized: 31 January 2000

Area
  - Total: 10,887 km^{2} (4,203 sq mi)

Population
  - 1995: 2,100,000
- Currency: Yugoslav dinar Deutsche Mark
- ISO 3166 code: XK
| Preceded by | Succeeded by |
| Socialist Autonomous Province of Kosovo | United Nations Administered Kosovo |

The Republic of Kosova (Albanian: Republika e Kosovës), also known as the First Republic of Kosova (Albanian: Republika e Parë e Kosovës), was a self-declared proto-state in Southeast Europe established in 1991. During its peak, it tried to establish its own parallel political institutions in opposition to the institutions of the Autonomous Province of Kosovo and Metohija held by Yugoslavia's Republic of Serbia.

== History ==
=== Proclamation ===
Late in June 1990, Ethnic Albanian members of the provincial assembly proposed a vote on whether to form a republic; the ethnic Serb president of the assembly immediately shut it down and promised to reopen the assembly on 2 July, which was later postponed.

On 2 July 1990, the vast majority of Ethnic Albanian members of the provincial assembly returned to the assembly building, but it had been locked; so in the street outside they voted to declare Kosovo a Republic within the Yugoslav federation. The Serbian government responded by dissolving the assembly and the government of Kosovo, removing any remaining autonomy. The Serb government then passed another law on labour relations which dismissed 80,000 Ethnic Albanian workers.

Ethnic Albanian members of the now officially dissolved Kosovo assembly met in secret in Kaçanik on 7 September 1990 and proclaimed the "Republic of Kosova" within Yugoslavia in which Yugoslav laws would only be valid if compatible with the Republic's constitution.

The "Republic of Kosova" was declared an independent state by the assembly 22 September 1991. This declaration was endorsed by 99% of voters in an referendum held a few days later. The Republic of Kosova received diplomatic recognition from Albania. Serb authorities rejected the election results, and tried to capture and prosecute those who had voted. In 1995, thousands of Serb refugees from Croatia were settled in Kosovo, which further worsened relations between the two communities.

=== Parallel structures ===
Kosovo Albanians organized a resistance movement, creating a number of parallel structures in education, medical care, and taxation. New schools opened, with houses being turned into facilities for schools, including high schools and universities. During parallel elections, new leaders were elected, forming a new country within a country. Because of the repression, the new government had its seat in exile. There was a parallel football league, following all the sports men and women being expelled from the stadiums and sports facilities.

=== NATO intervention ===
From 1995 onwards, tensions in the region escalated leading to the Kosovo War which began in February 1998, fought between the Federal Republic of Yugoslavia and the Kosovo Liberation Army (KLA) guerrilla force. The KLA-led campaign continued into January 1999 and was brought to the attention of the world media by the Račak massacre, the mass killing of about 45 Albanians (Including 9 KLA insurgents) by Serbian security forces. An international conference was held in Rambouillet, France later that spring and resulted in a proposed peace agreement, called the Rambouillet Agreement, which was accepted by the ethnic Albanian side but rejected by the Yugoslav government.

The failure of the talks at Rambouillet resulted in a NATO air campaign against the Federal Republic of Yugoslavia lasting from 24 March to 10 June when the Yugoslav authorities signed a military technical agreement. NATO-led international peacekeepers established the Kosovo Force (KFOR) and an international civilian mission was established by the name of the United Nations Interim Administration Mission (UNMIK), which entered Kosovo on 12 June 1999.

The United Nations assumed control of Kosovo in June 1999. A Joint Interim Administrative Structure was established to allow Kosovo political and community leaders to be represented in decisions in January 2000. The KLA was disbanded and replaced by the Kosovo Protection Corps, a lightly armed civilian emergency response organization. On 31 January 2000, the interim administration in Kosovo was recognized, officially ending the Republic of Kosova.

== Government ==
The system of governance in the Republic of Kosova was described in a constitution adopted in Kaçanik on 7 September 1990.

=== National symbols ===
The flag used by the Republic of Kosova was very similar to the flag of Albania, depicting a variant of the emblem on the same colored background. The national emblem of the Republic of Kosova was a double headed eagle, which was depicted on the presidential seal.

Presidential seal

=== Executive ===
President

The president of the Republic of Kosova was elected on 24 May 1992.

Political parties: LDK

| No. | Portrait | Name | Took office | Left office | Time in office | Party | Election |
|---|---|---|---|---|---|---|---|
| 1 | Ibrahim Rugova | Ibrahim Rugova (1944–2006) | 25 January 1992 | 1 February 2000 | 8 years, 7 days | LDK | 1992 |

Prime Minister

Political parties: LDK PDK

| No. | Portrait | Name (Birth–Death) | Term of office | | | Political party |
| No. | Portrait | Name (Birth–Death) | Took office | Left office | Time in office | Political party |
|---|---|---|---|---|---|---|
| 1 | Jusuf Zejnullahu | Jusuf Zejnullahu (born 1944) | 7 September 1990 | 5 October 1991 | 1 year, 28 days | LDK |
| 2 | Bujar Bukoshi | Bujar Bukoshi (1947–2025) | 5 October 1991 | 1 February 2000 | 8 years, 119 days | LDK |
| — | Hashim Thaçi | Hashim Thaçi (born 1968) Provisional Prime Minister; In opposition | 2 April 1999 | 1 February 2000 | 305 days | PDK |

Other ministers

| Position | Name | Period | Notes |
|---|---|---|---|
| Defence Minister | Hajzer Hajzeraj | 1991–1993 | |

Cabinet

| Assumed office | Prime Minister | Composition | Cabinet | Election |
|---|---|---|---|---|
| 7 September 1990 | Jusuf Zejnullahu | | Zejnullahu | |
| 19 October 1991 | Bujar Bukoshi | | Bukoshi | 1992 |
| 2 April 1999 | Hashim Thaçi | UÇK, LBD, LDK, LKÇK, PBD, PSHDK, SDA, UPSUP | Thaçi I | |

=== Legislature ===
The Assembly of the Republic of Kosova was elected on 24 May 1992.

Membership by party

| Party | Votes | % | Seats |
|---|---|---|---|
| Democratic League of Kosovo | 574,755 | 83.30 | 96 |
| Parliamentary Party of Kosovo | 36,549 | 5.30 | 14 |
| Peasant Party of Kosovo | 23,682 | 3.43 | 7 |
| Albanian Christian Democratic Party of Kosovo | 23,303 | 3.38 | 7 |
| Party of Democratic Action | 6,961 | 1.01 | 1 |
| Independents | 24,702 | 3.58 | 2 |
| Total | 689,952 | 100.00 | 127 |
Source: Source

Chairman of the Assembly

| No. | Portrait | Name (Birth–Death) | Term of office | | | Political party |
| No. | Portrait | Name (Birth–Death) | Took office | Left office | Time in office | Political party |
|---|---|---|---|---|---|---|
| Act. | | Bujar Gjurgjeala (1946–2018) | 2 July 1990 | 7 September 1990 | 67 days | Independent |
| 1 | | Ilaz Ramajli (born 1951) | 7 September 1990 | 25 May 1992 | 1 year, 261 days | Democratic League |
| | | Vacant (Note: The position of Speaker of the Assembly of Kosovo was vacant from 25 May 1999 to 10 December 2021, due to exile resulting from the insurgency and later the war in Kosovo.) | 25 May 1992 | 10 December 2001 | 9 years, 199 days | |

== International relations ==
=== Recognition ===
The Republic of Kosova was recognised as an independent state by:

- Albania (22 October 1991)

== Sport ==
A Basketball Federation of Kosovo was established in 1991 and an Olympic Committee of Kosovo was established in 1992.

In January 1993, the Football Federation of Kosovo signed a cooperation agreement with the Albanian Football Association and a team representing Kosovo played a friendly match against Albania in February 1993.

| 14 February 1993 Friendly | Albania | 3–1 | Kosovo | Tirana, Albania |
| | Abazi 38'; Seferi 39' (o.g.); Fortuzi 42' | Report | Munishi 72' | Stadium: Selman Stërmasi Stadium; Attendance: 14,000; Referee: Bujar Pregja (Albania) |

== See also ==
- Armed Forces of the Republic of Kosova
- Kosovo Liberation Army
- Kosovo Liberation Army
