= Protected areas of Denmark =

Protected areas of Denmark comprise a number of various current designations across Denmark proper, including Natura 2000, EU habitats areas and Ramsar areas.Denmark has a network of protected areas covering terrestrial, inland-water, marine and coastal areas.

== By municipality ==
- List of protected areas of Aarhus Municipality
- List of protected areas of Bornholm
- List of protected areas of Frederikssund Municipality
- List of protected areas of Gribskov Municipality
- List of protected areas of Halsnæs Municipality
- List of protected areas of Hillerød Municipality
- List of protected areas of Lejre Municipality
- List of protected areas of Roskilde Municipality

== National parks ==
There are five national parks in Denmark proper and one in Greenland.

- List of national parks of Denmark
