= Outline of Denmark =

Country in Scandinavia in Northern Europe

Civil and state flag
(Dannebrog)

Royal coat of arms

The location of Denmark

The following outline is provided as an overview, and topical guide to Denmark.

Denmark – country located in Scandinavia of Northern Europe. It is the southernmost of the Nordic countries. The mainland is bordered to the south by Germany; Denmark is southwest of Sweden and south of Norway. Denmark borders both the Baltic and the North Sea. The country consists of a large peninsula, Jutland (Jylland) and many islands, most notably Zealand (Sjælland), Funen (Fyn), Lolland, Falster and Bornholm as well as hundreds of minor islands often referred to as the Danish Archipelago. Denmark has long controlled the approach to the Baltic Sea (in a concept known as dominium maris baltici), and these waters are also known as the Danish Straits.

== General reference ==
- Pronunciation: /ˈdɛnmɑːrk/
- English country name: Denmark
- Endonym: Danmark
- Adjectival(s): Danish
- Demonym(s): Dane(s)
- Etymology: Name of Denmark
- International rankings of Denmark
- ISO country codes: DK, DNK, 208
- ISO region codes: See ISO 3166-2:DK
- Internet country code top-level domain: .dk

== Geography of Denmark ==
Geography of Denmark

Flag-map of Denmark

- Denmark is: a Nordic country
  - Member state of the European Union
  - Member state of NATO
- Location:
  - Northern Hemisphere and Eastern Hemisphere
  - Eurasia
    - Europe
      - Northern Europe
        - Scandinavia
  - Time zone: Central European Time (UTC+01), Central European Summer Time (UTC+02)
  - Extreme points of Denmark
    - High: Møllehøj 171 m (561 ft)
    - Low: Lammefjord −7 m (−23 ft)
  - Land boundaries: Germany 68 km
  - Coastline: 7,314 km
- Population of Denmark: 5,564,219 (2011 estimate) - 108th most populous country
- Area of Denmark: 43,098 km^{2}
- Atlas of Denmark

=== Environment of Denmark ===
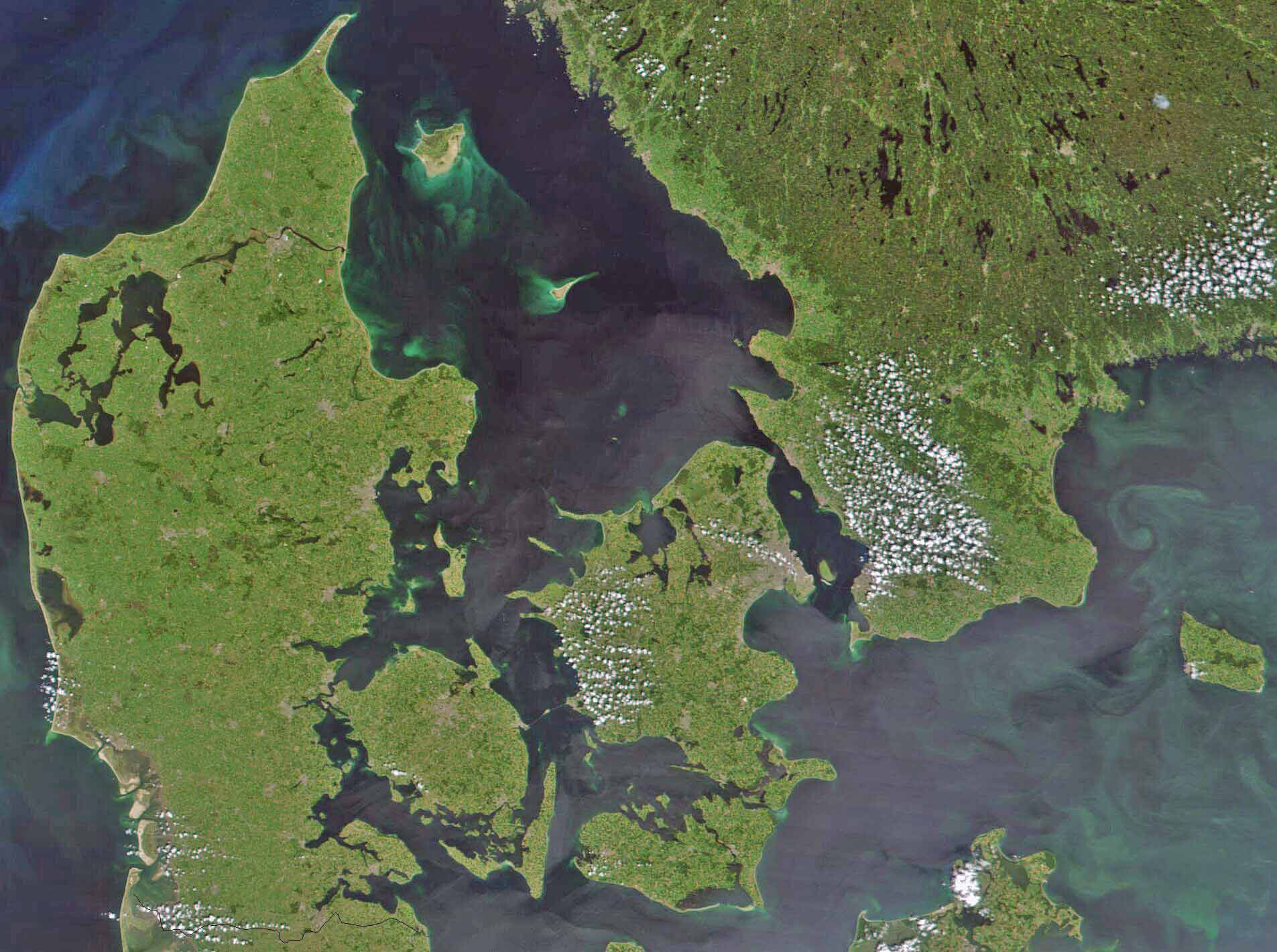
An enlargeable satellite image of Denmark

- Climate of Denmark
- Renewable energy in Denmark
- Geology of Denmark
- Protected areas of Denmark
  - Biosphere reserves in Denmark
  - National parks of Denmark
- Wildlife of Denmark
  - Fauna of Denmark
    - Birds of Denmark
    - Mammals of Denmark
  - Flora of Denmark
    - List of fir species of Denmark

==== Natural geographic features of Denmark ====
- Islands of Denmark
- Lakes of Denmark
- Rivers of Denmark
- World Heritage Sites in Denmark

=== Administrative divisions of Denmark ===
Administrative divisions of Denmark

Political map of Danish regions

- Regions of Denmark
  - Municipalities of Denmark

==== Regions ====
Regions of Denmark

Danish name	English name	Seat of administration	Largest city	Population (January 1, 2008)	Area (km^{2})	Pop. density (per km^{2})
Region Hovedstaden	Capital Region of Denmark	Hillerød	Copenhagen	1,645,825	2,561	642.6
Region Midtjylland	Central Denmark Region	Viborg	Aarhus	1,237,041	13,142	94.2
Region Nordjylland	North Denmark Region	Aalborg	Aalborg	578,839	7,927	73.2
Region Sjælland	Region Zealand	Sorø	Roskilde	819,427	7,273	112.7
Region Syddanmark	Region of Southern Denmark	Vejle	Odense	1,194,659	12,191	97.99
Entire country				5,475,791	43,094	127.0

==== Municipalities ====
Municipalities of Denmark

- Capital of Denmark: Copenhagen
- Cities of Denmark

=== Demography of Denmark ===
Demographics of Denmark

== Politics of Denmark ==
Politics of Denmark

- Form of government: parliamentary, representative democratic, constitutional monarchy
- Capital of Denmark: Copenhagen
- Elections in Denmark
- Political parties in Denmark
- Taxation in Denmark

=== Executive branch ===
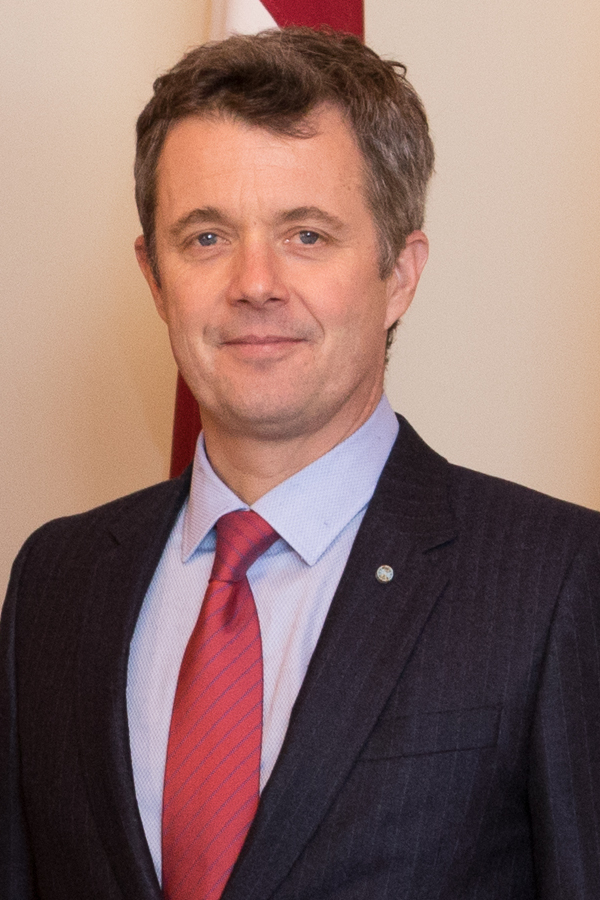
King Frederik X

- Head of state (ceremonial): King of Denmark, Frederik X
- Head of government: Prime Minister of Denmark
- Cabinet of Denmark

=== Legislative branch ===
- Folketing (unicameral)

=== Courts ===
Courts of Denmark

- Supreme Court of Denmark

=== Foreign relations of Denmark ===
Foreign relations of Denmark

- Diplomatic missions in Denmark
- Diplomatic missions of Denmark

==== International organization membership ====
Denmark is a member of:

- African Development Bank Group (AfDB) (nonregional member)
- Arctic Council
- Asian Development Bank (ADB) (nonregional member)
- Australia Group
- Bank for International Settlements (BIS)
- Council of Europe (CE)
- Council of the Baltic Sea States (CBSS)
- Euro-Atlantic Partnership Council (EAPC)
- European Bank for Reconstruction and Development (EBRD)
- European Investment Bank (EIB)
- European Organization for Nuclear Research (CERN)
- European Space Agency (ESA)
- European Union (EU)
- Food and Agriculture Organization (FAO)
- Group of 9 (G9)
- Inter-American Development Bank (IADB)
- International Atomic Energy Agency (IAEA)
- International Bank for Reconstruction and Development (IBRD)
- International Chamber of Commerce (ICC)
- International Civil Aviation Organization (ICAO)
- International Criminal Court (ICCt)
- International Criminal Police Organization (Interpol)
- International Development Association (IDA)
- International Federation of Red Cross and Red Crescent Societies (IFRCS)
- International Finance Corporation (IFC)
- International Fund for Agricultural Development (IFAD)
- International Hydrographic Organization (IHO)
- International Labour Organization (ILO)
- International Maritime Organization (IMO)
- International Mobile Satellite Organization (IMSO)
- International Monetary Fund (IMF)
- International Olympic Committee (IOC)
- International Organization for Migration (IOM)
- International Organization for Standardization (ISO)
- International Red Cross and Red Crescent Movement (ICRM)
- International Telecommunication Union (ITU)
- International Telecommunications Satellite Organization (ITSO)
- International Trade Union Confederation (ITUC)
- Inter-Parliamentary Union (IPU)
- Islamic Development Bank (IDB)
- Multilateral Investment Guarantee Agency (MIGA)
- Nordic Council (NC)
- Nordic Investment Bank (NIB)
- North Atlantic Treaty Organization (NATO)
- Nuclear Energy Agency (NEA)
- Nuclear Suppliers Group (NSG)
- Organisation for Economic Co-operation and Development (OECD)
- Organization for Security and Cooperation in Europe (OSCE)
- Organisation for the Prohibition of Chemical Weapons (OPCW)
- Organization of American States (OAS) (observer)
- Paris Club
- Permanent Court of Arbitration (PCA)
- Schengen Convention
- United Nations (UN)
- United Nations Conference on Trade and Development (UNCTAD)
- United Nations Educational, Scientific, and Cultural Organization (UNESCO)
- United Nations High Commissioner for Refugees (UNHCR)
- United Nations Industrial Development Organization (UNIDO)
- United Nations Military Observer Group in India and Pakistan (UNMOGIP)
- United Nations Mission in Liberia (UNMIL)
- United Nations Mission in the Sudan (UNMIS)
- United Nations Observer Mission in Georgia (UNOMIG)
- United Nations Organization Mission in the Democratic Republic of the Congo (MONUC)
- United Nations Relief and Works Agency for Palestine Refugees in the Near East (UNRWA)
- United Nations Truce Supervision Organization (UNTSO)
- Universal Postal Union (UPU)
- Western European Union (WEU) (observer)
- World Customs Organization (WCO)
- World Federation of Trade Unions (WFTU)
- World Health Organization (WHO)
- World Intellectual Property Organization (WIPO)
- World Meteorological Organization (WMO)
- World Trade Organization (WTO)
- World Veterans Federation
- Zangger Committee (ZC)

=== Law and order in Denmark ===
Law of Denmark

- Capital punishment in Denmark
- Constitution of Denmark
- Crime in Denmark
- Human rights in Denmark
  - LGBT rights in Denmark
  - Freedom of religion in Denmark
- Law enforcement in Denmark

=== Military of Denmark ===
Danish Defence

- Command
  - Commander-in-chief: Queen Margrethe II
    - Ministry of Defence of Denmark
- Forces
  - Royal Danish Army
  - Royal Danish Navy
  - Royal Danish Air Force
  - Danish Home Guard
- Military history of Denmark
- Military ranks:
  - Danish army ranks
  - Danish air force ranks

=== Local government in Denmark ===
Local government in Denmark

== History of Denmark ==
History of Denmark

- Military history of Denmark

== Culture of Denmark ==
Culture of Denmark

- Architecture of Denmark
- Cuisine of Denmark
- Ethnic minorities in Denmark
- Festivals in Denmark
- Folk culture in Denmark
- Languages of Denmark
- Media in Denmark
- Museums in Denmark
  - Coat of arms of Denmark
  - Flag of Denmark
  - National anthem of Denmark
- People of Denmark
- Prostitution in Denmark
- Public holidays in Denmark
- Records of Denmark
- Religion in Denmark
  - Buddhism in Denmark
  - Christianity in Denmark
    - Church of Denmark
    - Baptist Union of Denmark
    - Catholic Church in Denmark
  - Hinduism in Denmark
  - Islam in Denmark
    - Ahmadiyya in Denmark
  - Judaism in Denmark
- World Heritage Sites in Denmark

=== Art in Denmark ===
- Art in Denmark
- Cinema of Denmark
- Literature of Denmark
- Music of Denmark
- Television in Denmark
- Theatre in Denmark

=== Sports in Denmark ===
Sports in Denmark

- Football in Denmark
- Denmark at the Olympics

== Economy and infrastructure of Denmark ==
Economy of Denmark

- Economic rank, by nominal GDP (2010): 31st
- Agriculture in Denmark
- Banking in Denmark
  - National Bank of Denmark
- Communications in Denmark
  - Internet in Denmark
- Companies of Denmark
- Currency of Denmark: Krone
  - ISO 4217: DKK
- Copenhagen Stock Exchange
- Energy in Denmark
  - Energy policy of Denmark
  - Oil industry in Denmark
- Health care in Denmark
- Mining in Denmark
- Tourism in Denmark
- Transport in Denmark
  - Airports in Denmark
  - Rail transport in Denmark
  - Roads in Denmark
- Water supply and sanitation in Denmark

== Education in Denmark ==
Education in Denmark

- List of schools in Denmark
- List of universities in Denmark

== See also ==
Denmark

- Index of Denmark-related articles
- List of international rankings of Denmark
- Member state of the European Union
- Member state of the North Atlantic Treaty Organization
- Member state of the United Nations
- Outline of Europe
- Outline of geography
