= List of protected areas of Helsingør Municipality =

This list of protected areas of Helsingør Municipality is a list of protected areas of Helsingør Municipality, Denmark.

== List ==
Image	Locality	Size	Year	Coordinates	Description	Source
	Espergærde Strandvej	Ca. 0.37 ha	1932/1938			Ref
	Gurre Lake					Ref
	Gurre Sø	67 ha	1967			Ref
	Hellebækgård	806 ha	1974			Ref
	Hornbæk Sø	13 ha 1972	1941			Ref
	Lake Esrum: Surroundings	167 ha	1952			Ref
	Reerstrup, spejderhytte		2063			Ref
	Rørtang og Færgevejskilen	133 ha	2001			Ref
	Solbakken Allotments	15 ha	1970			Ref
	Teglstrup Hegn: Western pastures	51 ha	2010			Ref
	Tikøb Church	c. 165 ha	1985			Ref

== See also ==
- List of protected areas of Gribskov Municipality
- Danish Outdoor Council

Gelsingør

- List of protected areas of Hillerød Municipality
