= European Union roaming regulations =

Overview of roaming regulations in the European Union

Regulation 2022/612
- European Union regulation
- Text with EEA relevance
- Title: Regulation (EU) 2022/612 of the European Parliament and of the Council of 6 April 2022 on roaming on public mobile communications networks within the Union (recast)
- Made by: European Parliament & Council
- Journal reference: OJ L 115, 13.4.2022, pp. 1–37

History
- Date made: 6 April 2022

Other legislation
- Replaces: Regulation 531/2012

The Roaming Regulation 2022 ((EU) 2022/612) bans roaming charges (Eurotariff) within the European Economic Area (EEA), which consists of the member states of the European Union, Iceland, Liechtenstein and Norway along with two EU candidate states Moldova and Ukraine. This regulates both the charges mobile network operator can impose on its subscribers for using telephone and data services outside of the network's member state, and the wholesale rates networks can charge each other to allow their subscribers access to each other's networks. The 2012 Regulation was recast in 2022.

Since 2007, the roaming regulations have steadily lowered the maximum roaming charges allowable. In December 2016, the representatives of the Member States voted to abolish all roaming charges by June 2017 which eventually led to the abolition of all roaming charges for temporary roaming within the EEA as of 15 June 2017.

Provisions regulating roaming charges are contained in several regulations: Regulation No 531/2012 on roaming on public mobile communications networks within the Union, Regulation 2015/2120 and Regulation 2017/920 amending it, as well as Regulation 2016/2286 laying down detailed rules on the application of the fair use policy and Regulation 2021/2228 setting the weighted average of maximum mobile termination rates. As regards rules for wholesale roaming market, these are amended by Regulation 2017/920. Originally due to expire after 30 June 2022, a 10-year extension was agreed upon in April 2022. The current roaming regulation expires after 30 June 2032.

Research shows that the ban on roaming charges in 2017 more than doubled mobile data usage among travelers and led to a total consumer surplus of €2 billion within the first six months of implementation. The ban was likely overall welfare improving, as consumer gains exceeded the losses incurred by mobile network operators.

== History ==
=== Background ===
The European Commission has often raised the issue of high roaming charges within the European Union. In October 2005, the European Commission launched a consumer website on roaming tariffs in order to highlight the issue, which included €12 for a 4-minute call.

In 2006, when high roaming charge rates persisted the Commission proposed to intervene in the market by setting maximum rates at which mobile network operators could charge their subscribers. The proposed regulation was approved by the European Parliament and by the Council of Ministers, and came into law in June 2007. It required capping of retail and wholesale voice roaming charges from 30 August 2007, unless a special roaming tariff applied. The maximum prices was set to decrease further in 2008 and 2009. The regulation also required that customers travelling to another member state would receive a text message of the charges that apply for roaming services. Originally the capping measures were introduced on a temporary basis and were due to expire on 30 June 2010.

The law was amended in 2009 based on a review carried out under the 2007 regulation. The expiry date of the 2007 regulation was extended to 30 June 2012 and was extended to text messages and data roaming. It also provided for further annual reductions in the price capping until the expiry of the regulation and for compulsory per-second billing after 30 seconds for calls made, and per-second billing throughout for calls received.

Having still found that market conditions did not justify lifting the capping of roaming within the EEA, the EU replaced the law in 2012. Under the 2012 regulation retail roaming capping charges expired in 2017 and wholesale capping charges expired in 2022.

=== Roam like at home (RLAH) ===
In 2013 the Commission proposed to establish a single market for electronic communications within the Union and to abolish roaming charges. The proposal was approved by the European Parliament on 3 April 2014, by a margin of 534 votes to 25. As drafted it would have ended roaming charges from 15 December 2015. The Council of the European Union has to approve legislation before it can take effect, and ended up rejecting the specifics of the proposed legislation.

Regulation (EU) 2015/2120 which was adopted on 25 November 2015 provided for the phased reduction of roaming charges within the European Union. As a transitional measure, from May 2016 the existing price capping for roaming within the EEA was replaced by a maximum surcharge for roaming services which may be charged in addition to domestic charges. This however would not increase the cost of roaming for customers whose domestic rates plus the surcharge resulted in a higher price than the existing price caps. It reduced the charges for consumers with lower domestic prices or who pay for monthly allowances for using a particular service.

The Regulation also required the commission to submit a report to the European Parliament by June 2016 along with proposed legislative for regulation of the wholesale roaming market within the EU with a view to eliminating the transitional roaming surcharges by June 2017. Following the proposal made by the commission, the European Parliament and Member States reached an agreement on 31 January 2017 to set the subsequent wholesale roaming caps from 15 June 2017:

- €0.032 per min of voice call,
- €0.01 per SMS message,
- A step by step reduction over 5 years for data caps decreasing from €7.7/GB (on 15 June 2017) to €6/GB (01/01/2018), €4.5/GB (01/01/2019), €3.5/GB (01/01/2020), €3/GB (01/01/2021) and €2.5/GB (01/01/2022)

On 8 February 2017 member states' ambassadors endorsed the deal on wholesale caps that put an end to retail mobile roaming charges in the EU on 15 June 2017.

==== Fair use policy ====
To prevent misuse (i.e. cheaper tariffs available in the western members to be used constantly in the eastern members where tariffs are higher) a fair-use policy was mandated which would allow EEA citizens to use their phones while roaming without extra charges for business and leisure, but would still limit the use to prevent misuse and extra costs to mobile operators.

5 September 2016 proposal (retracted)

The initial proposal for a fair use policy was published on 5 September 2016. It would have limited the amount of free roaming to 90 days in a calendar year and a maximum of 30 consecutive days, after which regulated roaming charges (now in force) would apply. Registering in your home network on a given day would not count that day towards the limit. The proposal also stated that "the customer should nevertheless be able to consume volumes of such services equivalent to at least the average volume consumed domestically by the customers of the tariff plan in question", preventing operators from setting low call/data limits.

However, the proposal was hastily withdrawn just a couple of days after being published. Only a note on the commission's web site remained: "An initial draft was published on 5.9.2016. The Commission services have, on the instruction of President Juncker, withdrawn the draft and are working on a new version").

The proposal was also slammed by the telco lobbyists (GSMA & ETNO) claiming it would have been "..too complex to implement and unclear for consumers." They were inclined to set the cap lower, believing a "30 consecutive days granted to each consumer within the proposal would have already covered 100% of the needs of the vast majority of European citizens." Also, legal concerns were cited stating that "In Denmark, for example, the maximum length of a contract is six months, so customers would have been able to 'reset' their roaming allowance twice a year."

Finally, it was suggested to come up with a new proposal that would be "easy to execute, and effectively prevent arbitrage and distortions on domestic markets" and warning by quoting the Commission that "Otherwise, network quality and investments in new capacity in some Member States could be affected".

21 September 2016 Press release A press release issued on 21 September (IP/16/3111) reaffirmed the end of roaming charges in the EU by 2017 stating that "there should be no limits in terms of timing or volume imposed on consumers when using their mobile devices abroad in the EU." The new mechanism, although not defined in detail, "will be based on principle of residence or stable links European consumers may have with any EU Member State." (note the "any" – meaning multiple countries). A stable link is defined as: "work commuters, expats who are frequently present in their home country or Erasmus students." The final proposal was set to be published by 15 December 2016 following feedback from BEREC, Member States and all interested parties.

==== Consequences ====
As mobile operators still have to pay for wholesale charges when subscribers are roaming on other EEA networks, some operators have increased their subscription prices. In Norway, prices increased by 66% when RLAH was introduced. The same argument was being used by Danish operators. In Denmark several operators increased monthly subscription prices by 10–20 DKK.

Swedish operator Comviq removed roaming services on its plan "Fastpris mini" 15 June 2017. The operator Hallon is doing the same to its smallest plan "LITEN" starting 1 October 2017. In Denmark, operator Telmore introduced "TELMORE Home" without roaming services, even when travelling to countries outside the EEA. Vodafone UK introduced "UK-only plans" that disallow roaming altogether. This is possible because, while the Regulation disallows operators from charging extra for roaming when available, it does not force them to make roaming available in the first place.

Mobile operators in the EEA are also using "loopholes" in the Regulation to retain roaming charges. Operators can continue to impose surcharges if they can substantiate to the national regulators that they are unable to recover their "actual or projected costs" of providing roaming services.

AGcom, the Italian communications regulator has told Italian operators Vodafone, Telecom Italia and Lycamobile they must comply with all aspects of the roaming regulations, as they believed some features were not being universally applied. In Sweden, the Swedish Post and Telecom Authority has started investigating whether Comviq is in compliance with the roaming regulations. For prepaid cards, Comviq requires customers to top up an "EU package" costing approximately twice as much as a domestic one. O2 UK has admitted it temporarily throttled roaming speeds across Europe following the abolition of roaming charges.

Since Roam like at home was introduced, Telenor Norway have experienced a 150–200 % increase in data usage compared with the same period in 2016. The operator introduced free roaming in the EEA for most of its subscription plans in 2016, and from February 2016 to February 2017 data usage while roaming in the EEA increased by 900 percent. Telenor Sweden reports a 1500 % increase in data usage while roaming in the EEA.

== Non-roaming charges for international calls/texts ==
The European Union roaming regulations only regulate prices while the user is roaming. In 2013, the European commission proposed to regulate intra-EEA international calls, but it was rejected by the European Parliament and Council.

In 2018, the EU Parliament and Council (EU co-legislators) provisionally agreed on a reform of EU telecom rules. According to the provisional deal, the fees for intra-EU calls are capped to 19 cents for phone calls and 6 cents for text messages by 2019. Once the Parliament and the Council approve the provisional deal, Member States will have two years to transpose the Electronic Communications Code into national law.

According to Regulation (EU) 2018/1971 of the European Parliament and of the Council of 11 December 2018, any retail price (excluding VAT) charged to retail consumers for regulated intra-EU communications shall, starting 15 May 2019, not exceed:

- €0.19 per minutes of voice call,
- €0.06 per SMS message.

Business users in some Member States continue to pay the "original" international call rates of up to €1 per minute.

== Territorial extent ==
Map of countries and territories which participate in the European Union's "Roam like at home" scheme States which participate in RLAH (EEA members, Moldova, Ukraine) States in the process of joining RLAH (Western Balkans)

European Union roaming regulations apply to the 32 countries in total: the 27 member states of the European Union and their outermost regions, three EFTA member states Iceland, Liechtenstein and Norway along with two EU candidate states Moldova and Ukraine. The EU countries have applied the roaming regulation since 30 August 2007 while the remaining EEA countries have applied it since 1 January 2008. Ukraine and Moldova joined the EU roaming area on 1 January 2026 on the basis of bilateral agreements made with the EU.

=== Participating countries ===
- Austria
- Belgium
- Bulgaria
- Croatia
- Cyprus
- Czechia
- Denmark
- Estonia
- Finland
- France
- Germany
- Greece
- Hungary
- Iceland
- Ireland
- Italy
- Latvia
- Liechtenstein
- Lithuania
- Luxembourg
- Malta
- Moldova
- Netherlands
- Norway
- Poland
- Portugal
- Romania
- Slovakia
- Slovenia
- Spain
- Sweden
- Ukraine

=== Countries in the process of joining ===
- Albania
- Bosnia and Herzegovina
- Kosovo
- Montenegro
- North Macedonia
- Serbia

On 7 June 2017, Boris Larochevitch, Head of Division of the Eastern Partnership, Regional Cooperation and OSCE – European External Action Service, told Georgia's Public Broadcaster that the EU planned to abolish roaming fees for the six members of the Eastern Partnership; Georgia, Ukraine, Azerbaijan, Armenia, Moldova, and Belarus by 2020.

At the Sofia summit in May 2018, Western Balkan countries agreed to reduce roaming costs among themselves, and the EU pledged to develop a roadmap to reduce the roaming costs between the EU and the countries in the Western Balkans; Albania, Kosovo, Bosnia and Herzegovina, North Macedonia, Montenegro and Serbia. In Skopje on 18 February 2019, European Commissioner for Digital Economy and Society, Mariya Gabriel confirmed that once the Western Balkans reaches the new agreement on roaming prices among its economies, the EU stands ready for the reduction of tariffs between the WB and the EU.

On 4 April 2019, at the 2nd Western Balkans Digital Summit in Belgrade, the Western Balkan Ministers for Telecommunications signed the Regional Roaming Agreement which would gradually remove all roaming costs in the region. The agreement came into effect on 1 July 2019, enabling significantly lower roaming charges in the Western Balkans. Since 1 July 2021, all roaming tariffs have been removed, meaning no surcharge to the domestic retail price for calls, SMS & data while roaming in Western Balkans, similar to the concept of "Roam like at Home". The EU4Digital project stated that Regional Roaming Agreement will gradually reduce roaming prices within the Eastern partner countries. By the end of 2026, retail prices of roaming services for citizens of the signatory countries were expected to be reduced by 87%.

In December 2022, 38 mobile network operators from the EU and Western Balkans voluntarily agreed to lower their roaming charges between the Western Balkans and the EU. The voluntary agreement came into force on 1 October 2023.

On 25 February 2026, the European Commission proposed to open bilateral negotiations with the six Western Balkan countries in order to integrate them into the EU roaming area. On 4 June 2026, the Council approved the Commission's proposal to open negotiations with the six Western Balkan countries. During her November 2025 visit to the Western Balkans, the President of the European Commission Ursula von der Leyen suggested that roaming charges could be abolished between the EU and both Montenegro and Albania by the end of 2026. The European Commission began negotiations with the six Western Balkan countries on 6 November 2026.

=== Areas not covered ===
The United Kingdom left the EU at the end of January 2020. In accordance with the Brexit withdrawal agreement, free roaming was kept during a transition period ending on 31 December 2020. Free roaming between the UK and the EU is no longer guaranteed as the regulations are contained within a European regulation and not a directive, and have not been incorporated into UK law. However, some UK mobile providers, such as O2 and Virgin Mobile, and most of EU mobile providers have continued to allow free roaming for British and EU residents in the EU and EEA after the end of the Brexit transition period.

== Prices ==
=== Common limits ===
All roaming charges for temporary roaming were abolished on 15 June 2017 (fair-use rules apply). The tariffs covering the period from 30 April 2016 are maximum surcharges to the price paid in the home network.

In force from			30 Aug 2007 (Note: For Iceland, Liechtenstein and Norway listed conditions came in force from 1 January 2008.)	30 Aug 2008	1 Jul 2009	1 Jul 2010	1 Jul 2011	1 Jul 2012	1 Jul 2013	1 Jul 2014	30 Apr 2016	15 Jun 2017 (Note: Implementation of the "Roam like at Home" rules. All roaming charges for temporary roaming were abolished on 15 June 2017)	1 Jan 2018	1 Jan 2019	1 Jan 2020	1 Jan 2021	1 Jan 2022	1 Jul 2022 (Note: New roaming regulation with additional rules entered into force on 1 July 2022, extending RLAH until 2032.)	1 Jan 2023	1 Jan 2024	1 Jan 2025	1 Jan 2026 (Note: All conditions valid for Moldova and Ukraine starting 1 January 2026.)	1 Jan 2027
In force until			29 Aug 2008	30 Jun 2009	30 Jun 2010	30 Jun 2011	30 Jun 2012	30 Jun 2013	30 Jun 2014	29 Apr 2016	14 Jun 2017	31 Dec 2017	31 Dec 2018	31 Dec 2019	31 Dec 2020	31 Dec 2021	31 Jun 2022	31 Dec 2022	31 Dec 2023	31 Dec 2024	31 Dec 2025	31 Dec 2026	31 Dec 2032
Service	Unit	Subscription limit details	Roaming limits in EEA countries (all the prices are in euro without VAT)																				
Retail caps (apply to subscribers)
Outgoing calls to any EEA number	price of 1 minute	within fair usage limit	0.49	0.46	0.43	0.39	0.35	0.29	0.24	0.19	home network local rate + 0.05	home network local rate (Note: deducted from included national minutes, if minutes are available in the price plan)											
Outgoing calls to any EEA number	price of 1 minute	outside fair usage limit	0.49	0.46	0.43	0.39	0.35	0.29	0.24	0.19	home network local rate + 0.05	home network local rate + 0.032						home network local rate + 0.022			home network local rate + 0.019		
Outgoing calls to any EEA number	billing interval	any	Not regulated		per second starting from 31st second							home network local billing interval											
Incoming calls from any number	price of 1 minute	within fair usage limit	0.24	0.22	0.19	0.15	0.11	0.08	0.07	0.05	0.0114	Free											
Incoming calls from any number	price of 1 minute	outside fair usage limit	0.24	0.22	0.19	0.15	0.11	0.08	0.07	0.05	0.0114	0.0108	0.0091	0.0085 (Note: from 3 January 2019)	0.0079	0.0076	0.0072	0.0055	0.004	0.002			
Incoming calls from any number	billing interval	any	Not regulated		per second starting from 1st second							home network local billing interval											
Incoming calls redirected to voice mail (Note: When incoming calls are redirected to voice mail, operators can charge for message recording as much as a sum of their tariffs for incoming calls and outgoing calls back to home country. Beginning on 1 July 2010 operators cannot charge their roaming customers for the receipt by them of a roaming voice mail message. Listening to such messages could still be charged as an outgoing call in the future.)	price of 1 minute	any	0.73	0.68	0.62	Free																	
Outgoing text message to any EEA number	price of 1 message	within fair usage limit	Not regulated		0.11			0.09	0.08	0.06	home network local rate + 0.02	home network local rate (Note: deducted from included national messages, if messages are available in the price plan)											
Outgoing text message to any EEA number	price of 1 message	outside fair usage limit	Not regulated		0.11			0.09	0.08	0.06	home network local rate + 0.02	home network local rate + 0.01						home network local rate + 0.004			home network local rate + 0.003		
Incoming text message from any number	price of 1 message	any	Not regulated		Free																		
Data transfer	price of 1 gigabyte	within fair usage limit (Note: for price plans that include national data transfer (internet) service, before reaching included data limit)	Not regulated					716.80	460.80	204.80	home network rate + 51.20	deducted from included data (internet) limit											
Data transfer	price of 1 gigabyte	outside fair usage limit (Note: for price plans that include national data transfer (internet) service, after reaching included data limit AND price plans that do not include national data transfer (internet) service (e.g. prepaid plans))	Not regulated					716.80	460.80	204.80	home network rate + 51.20	7.70	6.00	4.50	3.50	3.00	2.50	2.00	1.80	1.55	1.30	1.10	1.00
Data transfer	billing interval	any	Not regulated					per 1 kilobyte starting from 1st kilobyte				home network billing interval											
Data transfer	monthly default cut-off limit	any	Not regulated			50.00																	
Right to choose an alternative roaming provider (ARP) (Note: Customer would have the option to sign for roaming contract, separate from national mobile services, while keeping the same phone number and SIM card.)		any	Not regulated							Yes	Not regulated												
Default notification text message with roaming prices and information		any	Not regulated		Yes																		
Free number to call for detailed roaming and information information		any	Not regulated		Yes																		
Free '112' access in roaming		any	Not regulated		Yes																		
Wholesale caps (Operator to Operator)
Outgoing calls to any EEA number	price of 1 minute	any	0.30	0.28	0.26	0.22	0.18	0.14	0.10	0.05		0.032						0.022			0.019		
Outgoing calls to any EEA number	billing interval	any	Not regulated		per second starting from 31st second																		
Inbound calls	price of 1 minute	any	same as termination of a non-roaming call on the visited network, see Termination rates. (Note: The visited network charges the same rate as it would charge for termination of a non-roaming call. This practice was already required by national regulators before the EU roaming regulations were implemented, so it is outside of the scope of this regulation.)									0.0108	0.0091 (Note: from 3 January 2018)	0.0085 (Note: from 3 January 2019)	0.0079	0.0076	0.0072	0.0055	0.004	0.002			
Outgoing text message to any EEA number	price of 1 message	any	Not regulated		0.04			0.03	0.02			0.01						0.004			0.003		
Incoming text message from any number		any	Not regulated		Free																		
Data transfer	price of 1 gigabyte	any	Not regulated		1024.00	819.20	512.00	256.00	153.60	51.20		7.70	6.00	4.50	3.50	3.00	2.50	2.00	1.80	1.55	1.30	1.10	1.00
Data transfer	billing interval	any	Not regulated		per 1 kilobyte starting from 1st kilobyte																		
Right to use other operators' networks in other Member States at regulated wholesale prices		any	Not regulated							Yes													
Legend		Past																					
Legend		Active																					
Legend		Future																					

=== Local price limits ===
For services paid for in currencies other than the euro, the amount in euro is converted to the other currency using the reference rates published in the Official Journal of the European Union (OJEU). After the adoption of EU regulation 531/2012 the retail exchange rate to be used for the relevant year should be calculated by taking the average of the reference exchange rates published in the OJEU on 1 March, 1 April and 1 May of that year, with the new exchange rate coming into force on 1 July of that year. The wholesale exchange rate however is taken from only the rate published on 1 May of that year.

From 1 July 2021 the maximum surcharges on retail prices (when not covered by roam like at home, such as when the fair-use policy hits in), including VAT, are as follows in local currencies (data prices are updated 1 January every year):

Country	VAT	Currency	Outgoing call to any EEA number	Inbound call	Outgoing text message to any EEA number	Data transfer (/GB)
Austria	20%	EUR				
Belgium	21%	EUR				
Bulgaria	20%	EUR				
Croatia	25%	EUR				
Cyprus	19%	EUR				
Czechia	21%	CZK				
Denmark	25%	DKK				
Estonia	24%	EUR				
Finland	25,5%	EUR				
France	20%	EUR				
Germany	19%	EUR				
Greece	24%	EUR				
Hungary	27%	HUF				
Iceland	24%	ISK				
Ireland	23%	EUR				
Italy	22%	EUR				
Latvia	21%	EUR				
Liechtenstein	7.7%	CHF				
Lithuania	21%	EUR				
Luxembourg	17%	EUR				
Malta	18%	EUR				
Netherlands	21%	EUR				
Norway	25%	NOK				
Poland	23%	PLN				
Portugal	23%	EUR				
Romania	19%	RON				
Slovakia	20%	EUR				
Slovenia	22%	EUR				
Spain	21%	EUR				
Sweden	25%	SEK				

Historical price limits from 1 July 2017
Country	VAT	Currency	Outgoing call to any EEA number	Inbound call	Outgoing text message to any EEA number	Data transfer (/GB)
Austria	20%	EUR	0.0384	0.0129	0.012	7.2
Bulgaria	20%	BGN	0.0751	0.0253	0.02347	14.0817
Belgium	21%	EUR	0.0387	0.0130	0.0121	7.26
Croatia	25%	HRK	7.4365	0.1005	0.0930	55.8495
Cyprus	19%	EUR	0.0380	0.0128	0.011	7.14
Czech Republic	21%	CZK	1.0447	0.3525	0.3264	195.8835
Denmark	25%	DKK	0.2974	0.1003	0.0929	55.77
Estonia	20%	EUR	0.0384	0.0129	0.012	7.2
Finland	24%	EUR	0.0396	0.01233	0.0124	9.548
France	20%	EUR	0.0384	0.0129	0.012	7.2
Germany	19%	EUR	0.0380	0.0128	0.011	7.14
Greece	24%	EUR	0.0396	0.01233	0.0124	7.44
Hungary	27%	HUF	12.5723	4.2431	3.9288	2357.2927
Iceland	24%	ISK	N/A (Note: In October 2008, the 2008 financial crisis brought about a collapse of the Icelandic banking sector. The value of the Icelandic króna dropped, and on 7 October 2008 the Icelandic Central Bank attempted to peg it at 131 against the euro. This peg was abandoned the next day. The króna later dropped again and to 340 against the euro before trade in the currency was suspended (by comparison, the rate at the start of 2008 was about 90 krónur to the euro). After a period of tentative, very low-volume international trading in the króna, activity had been expected to pick up again throughout November 2008, albeit still with low liquidity, as Iceland secured an International Monetary Fund loan. However, as of January 2009 the króna was still not being traded regularly, with the ECB reference rate being set only intermittently, the last time on 3 December 2008 at 290 króna per euro.)	N/A	N/A	N/A
Ireland	23%	EUR	0.0393	0.0132	0.0123	7.38
Italy	22%	EUR	0.0390	0.0131	0.0122	7.32
Latvia	21%	EUR	0.0387	0.0130	0.0121	7.26
Liechtenstein	8%	CHF	0.0370	0.0125	0.0115	6.9543
Lithuania	21%	EUR	0.0387	0.0130	0.0121	7.26
Luxembourg	17%	EUR	0.0374	0.0126	0.011	7.02
Malta	18%	EUR	0.0377	0.0127	0.0118	7.08
Netherlands	21%	EUR	0.0387	0.0130	0.0121	7.26
Norway	25%	NOK	0.3655	0.1233	0.1142	68.5387
Poland	23%	PLN	0.1672	0.0546	0.0522	31.365
Portugal	23%	EUR	0.0393	0.0132	0.0123	7.38
Romania	19%	RON	0.1729	0.0583	0.0540	32.4205
Slovakia	20%	EUR	0.0384	0.0129	0.012	7.2
Slovenia	22%	EUR	0.0390	0.0131	0.0122	7.32
Spain	21%	EUR	0.0387	0.0130	0.0121	7.26
Sweden	25%	SEK	0.3830	0.1292	0.1197	71.8215
United Kingdom	20%	GBP	0.0326	0.0110	0.0102	6.1286

Historical price limits from 1 July 2018
Country	VAT	Currency	Outgoing call to any EEA number	Inbound call	Outgoing text message to any EEA number	Data transfer (/GB)
Austria	20%	EUR	0.0384	0.0129	0.012	7.2
Bulgaria	20%	BGN	0.0751	0.0253	0.02347	14.0817
Belgium	21%	EUR	0.0387	0.0130	0.0121	7.26
Croatia	25%	HRK				
Cyprus	19%	EUR	0.0380	0.0128	0.011	7.14
Czech Republic	21%	CZK				
Denmark	25%	DKK				
Estonia	20%	EUR	0.0384	0.0129	0.012	7.2
Finland	24%	EUR	0.0396	0.01233	0.0124	9.548
France	20%	EUR	0.0384	0.0129	0.012	7.2
Germany	19%	EUR	0.0380	0.0128	0.011	7.14
Greece	24%	EUR	0.0396	0.01233	0.0124	7.44
Hungary	27%	HUF				
Iceland	24%	ISK				
Ireland	23%	EUR	0.0393	0.0132	0.0123	7.38
Italy	22%	EUR	0.0390	0.0131	0.0122	7.32
Latvia	21%	EUR	0.0387	0.0130	0.0121	7.26
Liechtenstein	8%	CHF				
Lithuania	21%	EUR	0.0387	0.0130	0.0121	7.26
Luxembourg	17%	EUR	0.0374	0.0126	0.011	7.02
Malta	18%	EUR	0.0377	0.0127	0.0118	7.08
Netherlands	21%	EUR	0.0387	0.0130	0.0121	7.26
Norway	25%	NOK	0			
Poland	23%	PLN				
Portugal	23%	EUR	0.0393	0.0132	0.0123	7.38
Romania	19%	RON				
Slovakia	20%	EUR	0.0384	0.0129	0.012	7.2
Slovenia	22%	EUR	0.0390	0.0131	0.0122	7.32
Spain	21%	EUR	0.0387	0.0130	0.0121	7.26
Sweden	25%	SEK	0.4116	0.1389	0.1286	77.1787
United Kingdom	20%	GBP	0.0337	0.0114	0.0105	6.3352

Historical price limits from 1 July 2019 (data prices from 1 January 2020)
Country	VAT	Currency	Outgoing call to any EEA number	Inbound call	Outgoing text message to any EEA number	Data transfer (/GB)
Austria	20%	EUR	0.0384	0.0102	0.012	4.20
Belgium	21%	EUR	0.03872	0.010285	0.0121	4.235
Bulgaria	20%	BGN	0.07510	0.0199	0.0234	8.2143
Croatia	25%	HRK	0.2969	0.0788	0.0028	32.4830
Cyprus	19%	EUR	0.03808	0.010115	0.0119	4.165
Czech Republic	21%	CZK	0.9946	0.26419	0.03108	108.7857
Denmark	25%	DKK	0.2985	0.0793	0.0932	32.65325
Estonia	20%	EUR	0.0384	0.0102	0.012	4.20
Finland	24%	EUR	0.03968	0.01054	0.0124	4.34
France	20%	EUR	0.0384	0.0102	0.012	4.20
Germany	19%	EUR	0.03808	0.010115	0.0119	4.165
Greece	24%	EUR	0.03968	0.01054	0.0124	4.34
Hungary	27%	HUF	13.0045	3.4543	4.0639	1422.3702
Iceland	24%	ISK	5.4149	1.4383	1.6921	592.265
Ireland	23%	EUR	0.03936	0.010455	0.0123	4.305
Italy	22%	EUR	0.03904	0.01037	0.0122	4.27
Latvia	21%	EUR	0.03872	0.010285	0.0121	4.235
Liechtenstein	7.7%	CHF	0.039	0.01036	0.0121	4.2659
Lithuania	21%	EUR	0.03872	0.010285	0.0121	4.235
Luxembourg	17%	EUR	0.03744	0.009945	0.0117	4.095
Malta	18%	EUR	0.03776	0.0118354	0.0118	4.13
Netherlands	21%	EUR	0.03872	0.010285	0.0121	4.235
Norway	25%	NOK	0.38738	0.10289781	0.12105625	42.3696875
Poland	23%	PLN	0.1691	0.0449	0.05287	18.5059
Portugal	23%	EUR	0.03936	0.010455	0.0123	4.305
Romania	19%	RON	0.1810	0.0480	0.05657	19.8029
Slovakia	20%	EUR	0.0384	0.0102	0.012	4.20
Slovenia	22%	EUR	0.03904	0.01037	0.0122	4.27
Spain	21%	EUR	0.03872	0.010285	0.0121	4.235
Sweden	25%	SEK	0.420232	0.1162412	0.1313225	45.962875
United Kingdom	20%	GBP	0.03301	0.008769	0.0103165	3.6107

==== Exchange rates ====
Country	Currency	1 March 2021	1 April 2021	1 May 2021	Average
Bulgaria	BGN	1.95583	1.95583	1.95583	1.95583
Croatia	HRK				
Czech Republic	CZK				
Denmark	DKK				
Hungary	HUF				
Iceland	ISK				
Liechtenstein	CHF				
Norway	NOK				
Poland	PLN				
Romania	RON				
Sweden	SEK				

Historical exchange rates 2017
Country	Currency	1 March 2017	1 April 2017	3 May 2017 (Note: No reference rates published in the Official Journal of the European Union (OJoEU) on 1 May 2017.)	Average
Bulgaria	BGN	1.9558	1.9558	1.9558	1.9558
Croatia	HRK	7.4365	7.4465	7.4570	7.4466
Czech Republic	CZK	27.021	27.030	26.893	26.9812
Denmark	DKK	7.4332	7.4379	7.4370	7.4360
Hungary	HUF	308.25	307.62	312.20	309.356
Iceland	ISK	N/A	N/A	N/A	N/A
Liechtenstein	CHF	1.0648	1.0696	1.0852	1.0732
Norway	NOK	8.8693	9.1683	9.3780	9.1385
Poland	PLN	4.3148	4.2265	4.2088	4.2500
Romania	RON	4.5202	4.5525	4.5495	4.5407
Sweden	SEK	9.5675	9.5322	9.6290	9.5762
United Kingdom	GBP	0.85305	0.85553	0.84520	0.8512

Historical exchange rates 2018
Country	Currency	1 March 2018	3 April 2018 (Note: No reference rates published in the Official Journal of the European Union (OJoEU) on 1 April 2018.)	2 May 2018	Average
Bulgaria	BGN	1.9558	1.9558	1.9558	1.9558
Croatia	HRK	7.4505	7.4428	7.41	7.4344
Czech Republic	CZK	25.418	25.462	25.542	25.474
Denmark	DKK	7.4465	7.4513	7.4501	7,4493
Hungary	HUF	313.93	312.51	313.55	313.33
Iceland	ISK	123.70	121.50	122.20	122.4666
Liechtenstein	CHF	1.1520	1.1801	1.1968	1.1763
Norway	NOK	9.6153	9.6423	9.6620	9.6398
Poland	PLN	4.1781	4.2072	4.2264	4.2039
Romania	RON	4.6630	4.6525	4.6614	4.6589
Sweden	SEK	10.0923	10.28	10.4993	10.2905
United Kingdom	GBP	0.88415	0.87605	0.8796	0,8799

Historical exchange rates 2019
Country	Currency	1 March 2019	1 April 2019	1 May 2019	Average
Bulgaria	BGN	1.9558	1.9558	1.9558	1.9558
Croatia	HRK	7.4275	7.4338	7.4130	7.4247
Czech Republic	CZK	25.601	25.802	25.659	25.6873
Denmark	DKK	7.4611	7.4652	7.4646	7.4636
Hungary	HUF	315.96	321.05	322.97	319.9933
Iceland	ISK	135.70	137.50	136.20	136.4666
Liechtenstein	CHF	1.1335	1.1181	1.1437	1.1317
Norway	NOK	9.7268	9.6590	9.6678	9.6845
Poland	PLN	4.3089	4.3006	4.2868	4.2987
Romania	RON	4.7434	4.7608	4.7596	4.7546
Sweden	SEK	10.4844	10.3980	10.6350	10.5058
United Kingdom	GBP	0.85835	0.85830	0.86248	0.85971

Historical exchange rates 2020
Country	Currency	3 March 2020 (Note: No reference rates published in the Official Journal of the European Union (OJoEU) on 1 March 2020.)	2 April 2020 (Note: No reference rates published in the Official Journal of the European Union (OJoEU) on 1 April 2020.)	5 May 2020 (Note: No reference rates published in the Official Journal of the European Union (OJoEU) on 1 May 2020.)	Average
Bulgaria	BGN	1.9558	1.9558	1.9558	1.9558
Croatia	HRK	7.4853	7.6305	7.5735	7.5631
Czech Republic	CZK	25.475	27.553	26.978	26.669
Denmark	DKK	7.4730	7.4661	7.4612	7.4668
Hungary	HUF	336.68	363.73	350.27	350.23
Iceland	ISK	142.90	155.30	159.30	152.50
Liechtenstein	CHF	1.0646	1.0551	1.0525	1.0574
Norway	NOK	10.3328	11.2345	11.1730	10.9134
Poland	PLN	4.3166	4.5697	4.5316	4.4726
Romania	RON	4.8087	4.8320	4.8260	4.8222
Sweden	SEK	10.5590	10.9265	10.6980	10.7278
United Kingdom	GBP	0.87010	0.87738	0.87060	0.87269

==== Method of calculating ====
As the VAT rates and currencies vary across the EEA, the European Commission publishes price caps in euro and excluding VAT. So the final prices for each country can be calculated by adding the corresponding VAT rate and converting to the currency of the country (if non-euro).

For countries using the euro	For countries using currency other than euro
$x = \left(1+\frac{\text{VAT}}{100\%}\right) \cdot EC_{\text{rate}}$	$x = \left(1+\frac{\text{VAT}}{100\%}\right) \cdot EC_\text{rate} \cdot Ex_\text{rate}$

where
$EC_{\text{rate}}$ is European Commission maximum allowed tariff without VAT in euro
${\text{VAT}}$ is Value Added Tax rate for specified country, given in per cent
$Ex_{\text{rate}}$ is Exchange rate for specified country published by ECB

In order to avoid double taxation, non-taxation or the distortion of competition, an EU member state may, in accordance with Article 9(3)(a) of Council Directive 77/388 ("the Sixth VAT Directive"), include within the scope of its national VAT any telecommunications services used within its territory but billed outside the EU VAT area. When opting to do so, it must also exempt from its national VAT any roaming services supplied by home networks within its territory but used outside the EU VAT area. The inclusion of telecommunications within the scope of Article 9 was requested by the former EU member state United Kingdom. Consequently, when an EU member state makes this VAT exemption, roaming on networks in Åland, Iceland, Liechtenstein, Norway, the Canary Islands, Ceuta, Melilla and French overseas departments is subject to the price caps with no VAT applied, because these countries and territories are within the EEA but outside the EU VAT area.

==== Rounding ====
The charge limits for the Eurotariff and the wholesale average charge should be calculated to the maximum number of decimal places permitted by the official exchange rate. This sets the maximum that can be charged in the national currency. Providers may wish in practice to quote charges in whole numbers of currency units, especially at the retail level, although this in practice is not compulsory. In this case, the numbers should be rounded down. Rounding up of these numbers to above the level of the relevant cap is not permitted under any circumstances.

== See also ==
- Digital Single Market
- Roaming
- Telecommunications in Europe
- Regional Roaming Agreement
