= Regional Roaming Agreement =

Balkan agreement on mobile roaming charges

The Regional Roaming Agreement, formally the Agreement on the price reduction of the roaming services in public mobile communications networks in the Western Balkans region, regulates the imposition of roaming charges within the countries in the Western Balkans; Albania, Kosovo, Bosnia and Herzegovina, North Macedonia, Montenegro and Serbia. The agreement covers both the charges mobile network operators can impose on their subscribers for using telephone and data services outside of the network's member state, and the wholesale rates networks can charge each other to allow their subscribers access to each other's networks.

The agreement came into effect from 1 July 2019, with reduced tariffs. On average, prices for outgoing calls dropped by 65% and prices for data transfer dropped by 78%.

Since 1 July 2021, all roaming tariffs have been removed, meaning no surcharge to the domestic retail price for calls, SMS & data while roaming in Western Balkans, similar to the concept of "Roam like at Home".

== History ==
Representatives of the economies from the Western Balkans gathered in Brussels 14 December 2018 to discuss the new Regional Roaming Agreement (RRA), at the meeting of the Western Balkans Roaming Policy, organized by the Regional Cooperation Council (RCC).

On 4 April 2019, at the 2nd Western Balkans Digital Summit in Belgrade, the Western Balkan Ministers for Telecommunications signed an agreement to gradually remove all roaming costs in the region. The agreement came into effect on 1 July 2019, enabling significantly lower roaming charges in the Western Balkans. Since 1 July 2021, all roaming tariffs have been removed, similar to the concept of “Roam like at Home” within the European Economic Area (EEA).

== Territorial extent ==
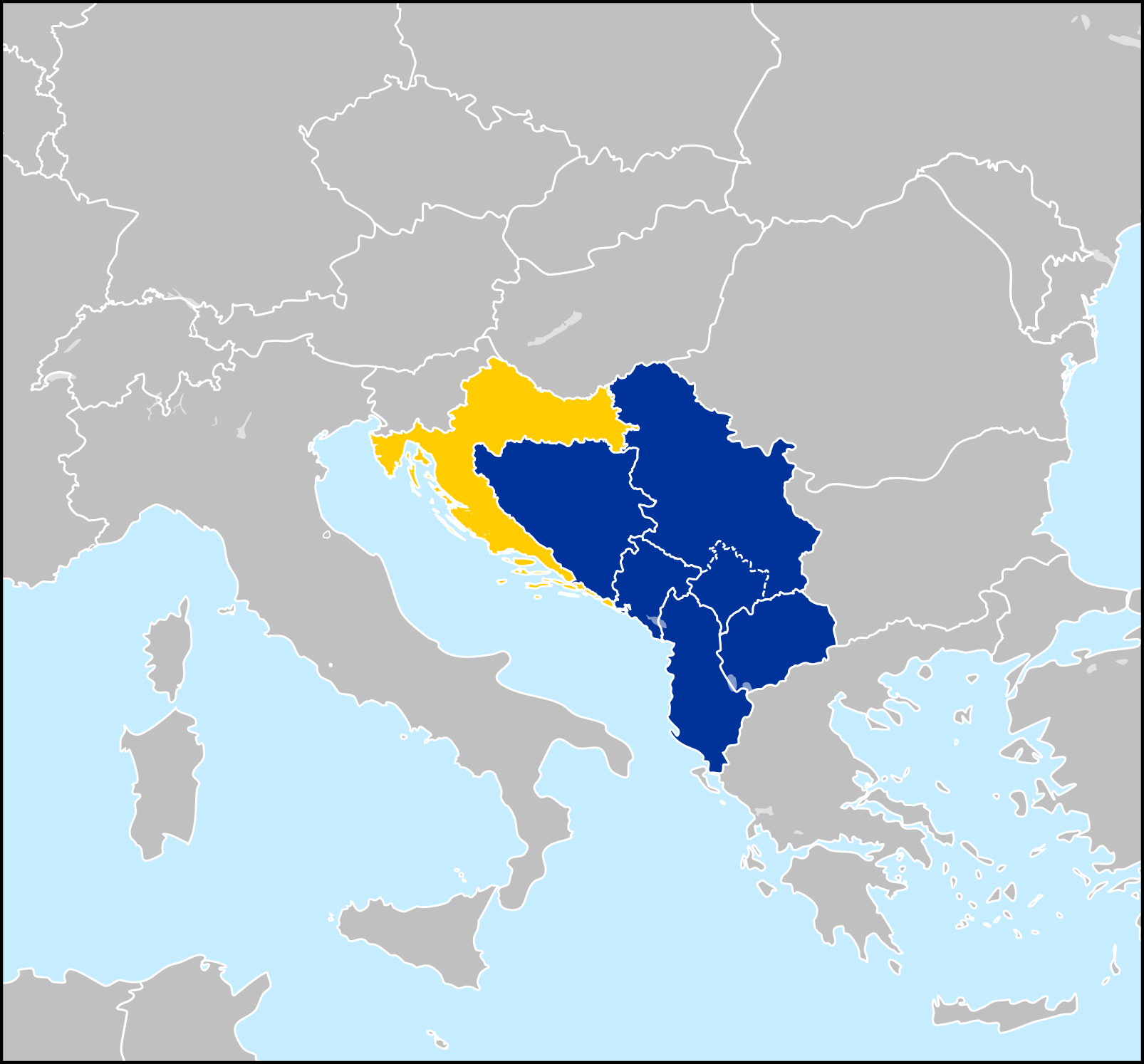
Western Balkan countries (in blue) – Albania, Bosnia and Herzegovina, Croatia, Montenegro, North Macedonia and Serbia. The partially recognized Kosovo is also demarcated. Slovenia (in grey, north-west of Croatia) joined the EU in 2004, while Croatia (in yellow) joined the EU in 2013.

The Agreement on the price reduction of the roaming services in public mobile communications networks in the Western Balkans region apply to the countries in Western Balkans:

- Albania
- Bosnia and Herzegovina
- Kosovo
- North Macedonia
- Montenegro
- Serbia

Majlinda Bregu, the Secretary General of the Regional Cooperation Council (RCC) and the European Commissioner for Digital Economy and Society, Mariya Gabriel discussed the new Regional Roaming Agreement (RRA2) for the Western Balkans in Skopje on 18 February 2019. Commissioner Gabriel confirmed that, once the Western Balkans reaches a new agreement on roaming prices among its economies, the EU stands ready for the reduction of tariffs.

In late 2021, the RCC announced that it would start working with the European Union on reducing roaming charges between the Western Balkans and the EU.

== Prices ==
In force from	1 July 2019	1 July 2021
Roaming limits in Western Balkans countries (in EUR, excl. VAT)
Outgoing calls	0.19	home network local rate
Outgoing text message	0.06	home network local rate
Data transfer	0.025	home network local rate
Legend	Past	
Legend	Active	

== See also ==
- European Union roaming regulations – Overview of roaming regulations in the European Union
- Open Balkan – Economic zone formed by a regional organization in Southeastern Europe
- Roaming – Wireless telecommunication term
- Telecommunications in Europe – Set index article
