= Open Balkan =

Economic zone formed by a regional organization in Southeastern Europe

Open Balkan: Ballkani i Hapur (Albanian); Отворен Балкан (Macedonian); Отворени Балкан (Serbian)
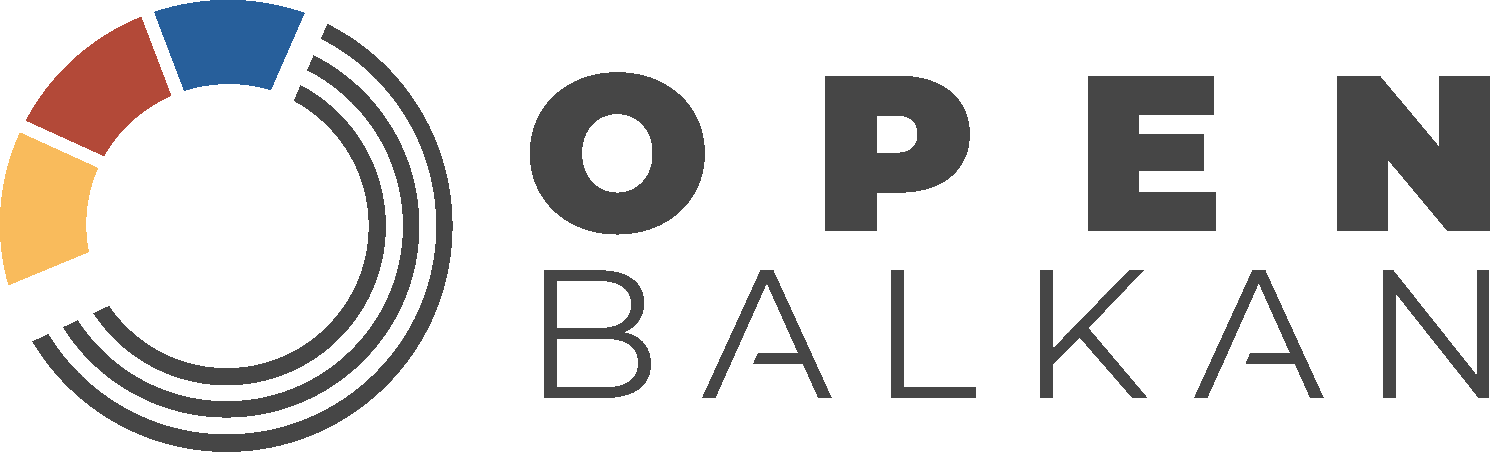
- Logo

- Member states Potential member states
- Administrative centers: Belgrade; Skopje; Tirana
- Official languages: Albanian; Macedonian; Serbian
- Membership: Albania; North Macedonia; Serbia
- Establishment: 29 July 2021

Area
  - Total: 131.935 km^{2} (50.940 sq mi)

Population
  - 2026 estimate: 10,967,500
- GDP (PPP): estimate
  - Total: $351.070 billion
  - Per capita: $32,010
- GDP (nominal): 2026 estimate
  - Total: $166.970 billion
- Currency: (North Macedonia) Denar; (Serbia) Dinar; (Albania) Lek
- Time zone: UTC+01:00

The Open Balkan is an economic and political zone of three sovereign states in the Balkans, those being Albania, North Macedonia, and Serbia. The zone has a total area of 131,935 km^{2} (50,940 sq mi) and an estimated total population of almost 11 million located in Southeastern Europe. The official languages are Albanian, Macedonian, and Serbian. Its administrative centres are the cities of Belgrade, Skopje, and Tirana. With the establishment of the zone, all three member states aim to increase trade and cooperation, as well as improve bilateral relations.

== History ==
A clickable Euler diagram showing the relationships between various European regional organisations

The idea of the Open Balkan (formerly known as "Mini-Schengen Area") came in the early 1990s. It was first mentioned as an economic area between these countries of the Balkan Peninsula. The plans were eventually abandoned due to the Yugoslav Wars (1991–2001). The first signs of the Open Balkan emerged in 2018 as a way to improve political relations. The idea of the area was brought by the current Prime Minister of Albania, Edi Rama, in Berlin when he discussed it with the interested nations. Rama took the idea of the former Prime Minister of Albania, Fatos Nano.

The former name referred to the Schengen Area, a common travel area that includes 29 European countries, but not the aforementioned Balkan countries. The plans for the area were declared on 10 October 2019 in Novi Sad. Two meetings were held, one in Ohrid on 11 November 2019, and the other on 12 December 2019 in Durrës. These countries declared to form a unified market of 12 million people by the end of 2020. On 11 November 2019, at the 2019 Ohrid summit, the President of Serbia, Aleksandar Vučić, the Prime Minister of Albania, Edi Rama, and the Prime Minister of North Macedonia, Zoran Zaev, agreed to create an economic zone in the Western Balkans, which would further improve political and economic relations and strengthen cultural ties between the nations.

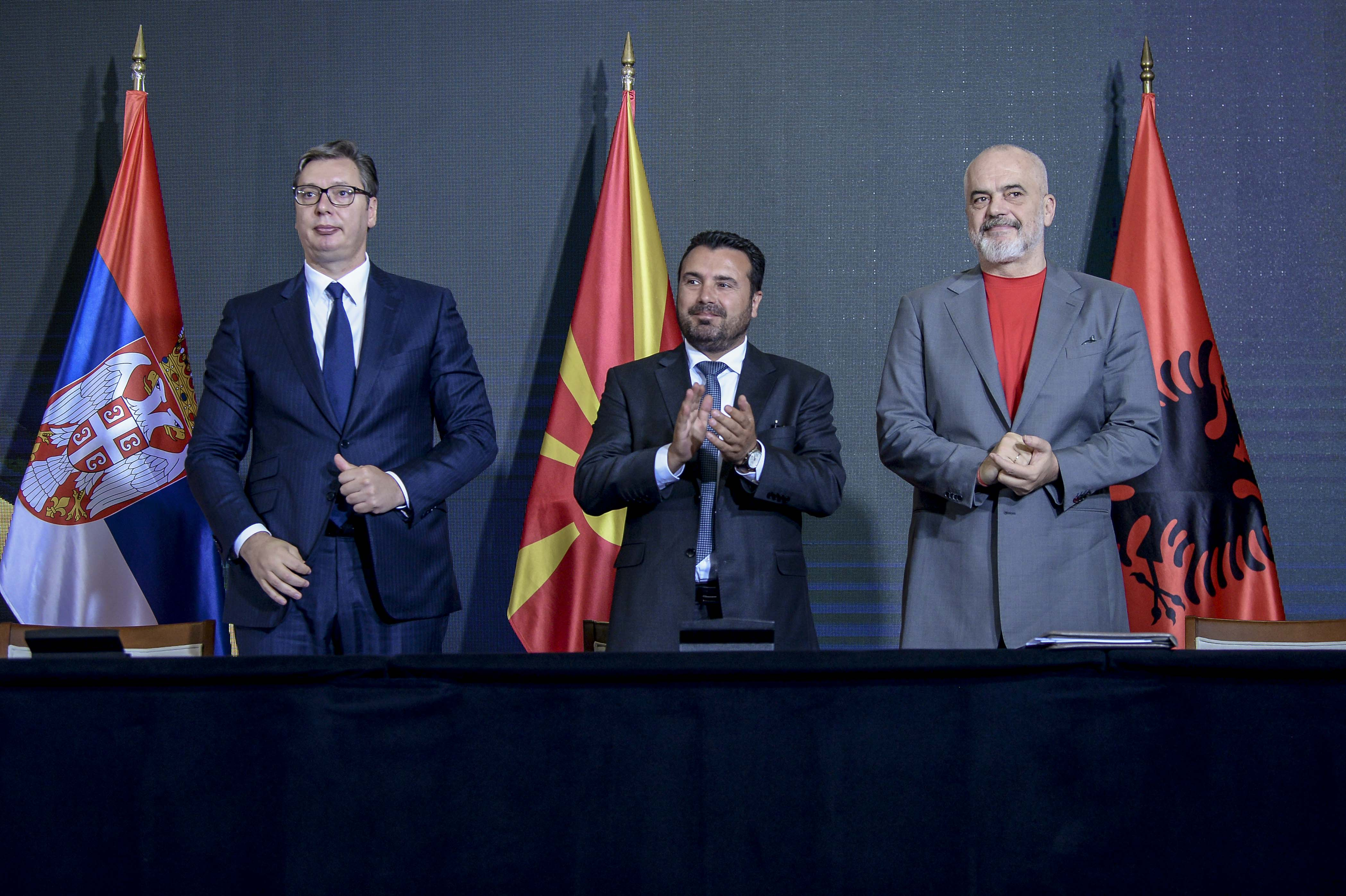
From left to right: the President of Serbia, Aleksandar Vučić, the Prime Minister of North Macedonia, Zoran Zaev, and the Prime Minister of Albania, Edi Rama, attending the Economic Forum for Regional Cooperation (2021)

The first meeting was due to be held in January or February 2020 in Serbia. However, due to the COVID-19 pandemic, the meeting was postponed and a potential date for new meeting was tentatively scheduled for spring or summer 2020. An Open Balkan summit was held on 2 September 2022 in Belgrade. Albania, North Macedonia, and Serbia signed several agreements on the exchange of food products, energy, cinematography, as well as cooperation in emergency situations. The three countries also agreed to further cooperation and easing tensions in the Western Balkans. In addition, the Prime Minister of Montenegro, Dritan Abazović, and the Chairman of the Council of Ministers of Bosnia and Herzegovina, Zoran Tegeltija, also attended the summit, expressing their wishes for these countries to join the initiative.

== Purpose ==
The Open Balkan's common goals are to provide greater opportunities for trade, student exchanges, and encourage European integration among its member states, inter alia. Citizens of member states will need only an ID card to visit other member states, saving time at border crossings. This economic zone prepares the countries to become members of the European Union. In this union, goods and capital between these countries would flow quicker and more than 30 million hours would be saved crossing the borders of these three countries every year. The estimate of the World Bank projects savings of $3.2 billion.

On 29 July 2021, Serbian President Aleksandar Vučić, Albanian Prime Minister Edi Rama, and North Macedonian Prime Minister Zoran Zaev participated in the forum for regional economic cooperation in Skopje, where they signed agreements on the movement of goods, access to the labor market, and cooperation in protection against disasters. It has been agreed mutual acceptance of diplomas and job qualifications, all making work forces more flexible and available and so attracting more investment. As part of the initiative, a regional economic forum attended by some 350 companies, mostly coming from these three countries but also from the wider region, was also held.

== Current member states ==
The Open Balkan currently comprises three member states: Albania, North Macedonia, and Serbia.

State	Capital	Accession	Population (2026)	Area	GDP (nominal)	GDP Per capita	Urban areas
Albania	Tirana	Founder	2,668,500	28,748 km^{2} (11,100 sq mi)	$33.330 billion	$12.490	Durrës, Elbasan, Vlorë, Shkodër
North Macedonia	Skopje	Founder	1,805,713	25,713 km^{2} (9,928 sq mi)	$21.610 billion	$11,970	Bitola, Kumanovo, Prilep, Tetovo
Serbia	Belgrade	Founder	6,493,168	77,474 km^{2} (29,913 sq mi)	$112.030 billion	$17,250	Novi Sad, Niš, Subotica, Kragujevac

== Potential member states ==
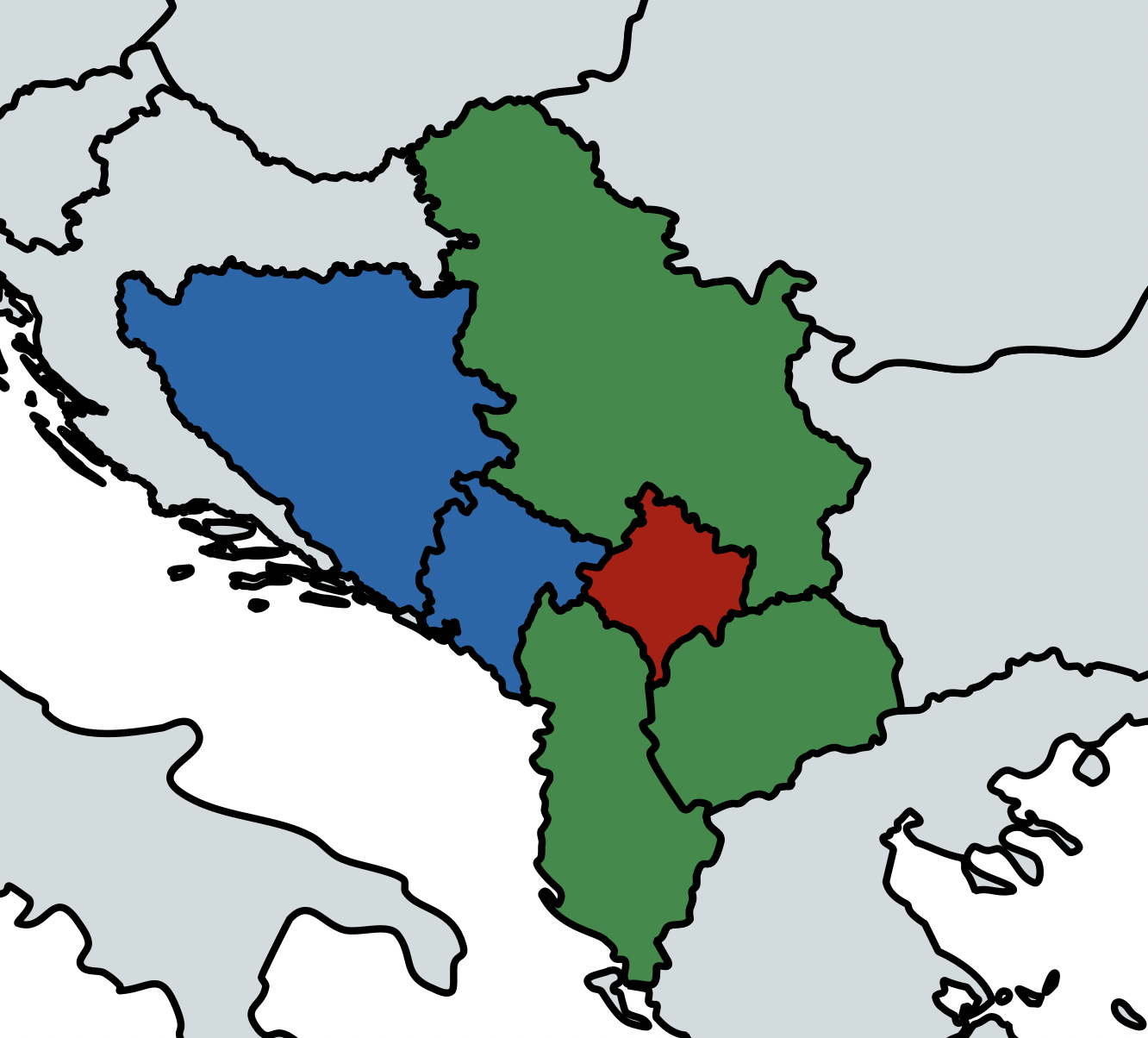
Official reactions to the Open Balkan initiative: Founders (Albania, North Macedonia, Serbia) Negative (Kosovo) Mixed (Bosnia and Herzegovina, Montenegro)

Three potential members are Bosnia and Herzegovina, Kosovo, and Montenegro.

=== Bosnia and Herzegovina ===
Former Chairman of the Council of Ministers of Bosnia and Herzegovina, Zoran Tegeltija, expressed his personal support for the Open Balkan initiative, but Bosnia and Herzegovina still lacks a consensus about it for "political reasons".

=== Kosovo ===
On 4 September 2020, Kosovo agreed to join the Mini-Schengen Area as part of the Kosovo and Serbia economic normalization agreements, but so far has not signed any agreement with the Open Balkan founding countries, even opposing the whole project. Prime Minister of Kosovo, Albin Kurti, rejected the invitation for the summit in Ohrid which was held on 7–8 June. Kurti declared that "the Open Balkan initiative is a harmful regional initiative with no vision. Kosovo does not want to join in because Serbia is not treating it as an equal side and independent country".

=== Montenegro ===
Former Prime Minister of Montenegro, Dritan Abazović, expressed his personal support for the Open Balkan initiative, saying that "The Open Balkan initiative was made for six countries." Also following the latest voting in Montenegro (2023), the collective voice of the people has expressed a desire to become part of the Open Balkan initiative. The current President of Montenegro, Jakov Milatović, during an interview published on the Viennese newspaper Der Standard about Montenegro's role in the current geopolitical landscape, declared that "our part of Europe was the only one without borders 50 years ago, but now it has borders. He also added that joining the Open Balkan is a measure to facilitate relations with Serbia, and that 60 percent of Montenegrins want Montenegro to participate in the initiative."

== Economy ==
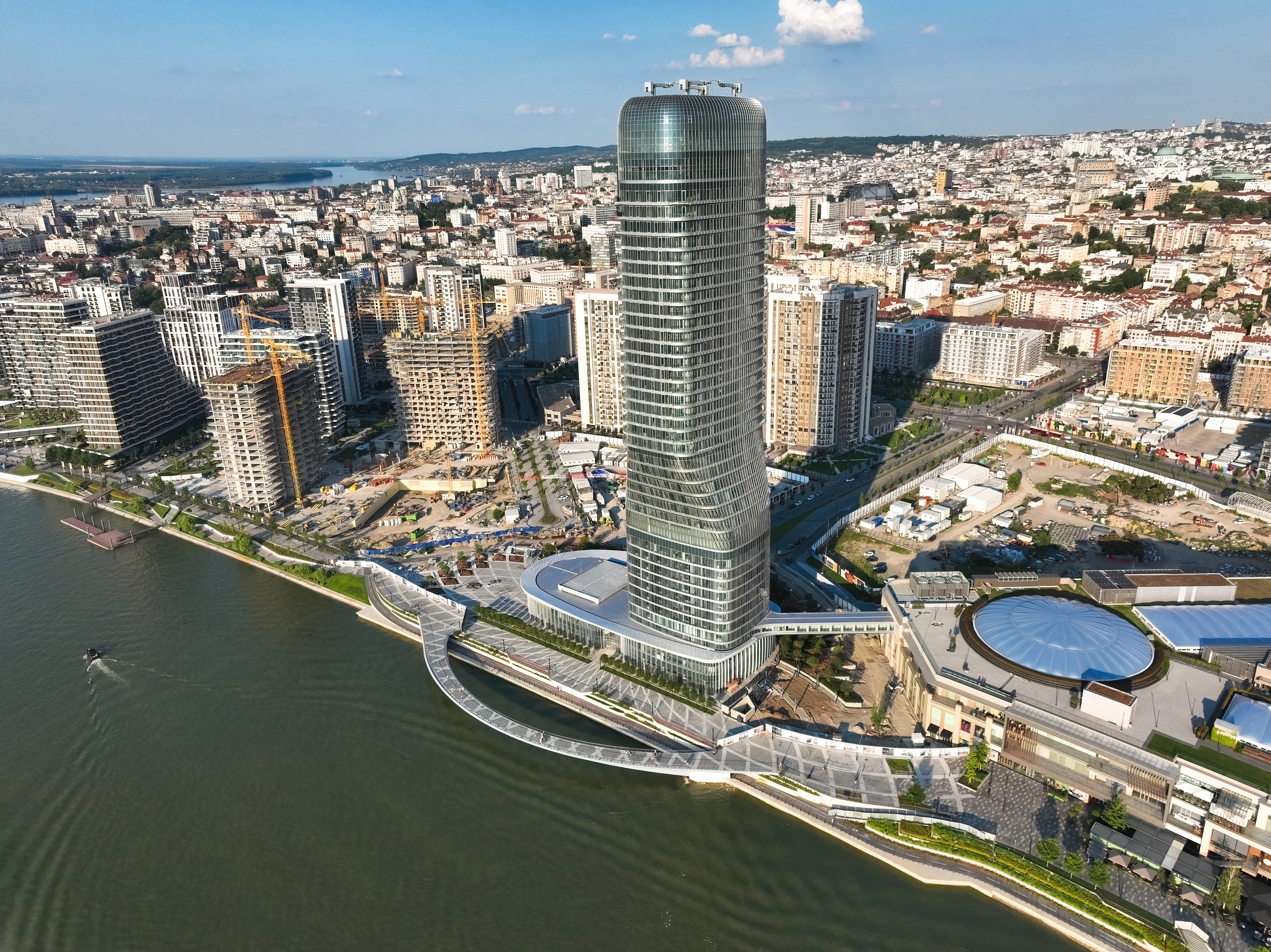
(Serbia) Belgrade

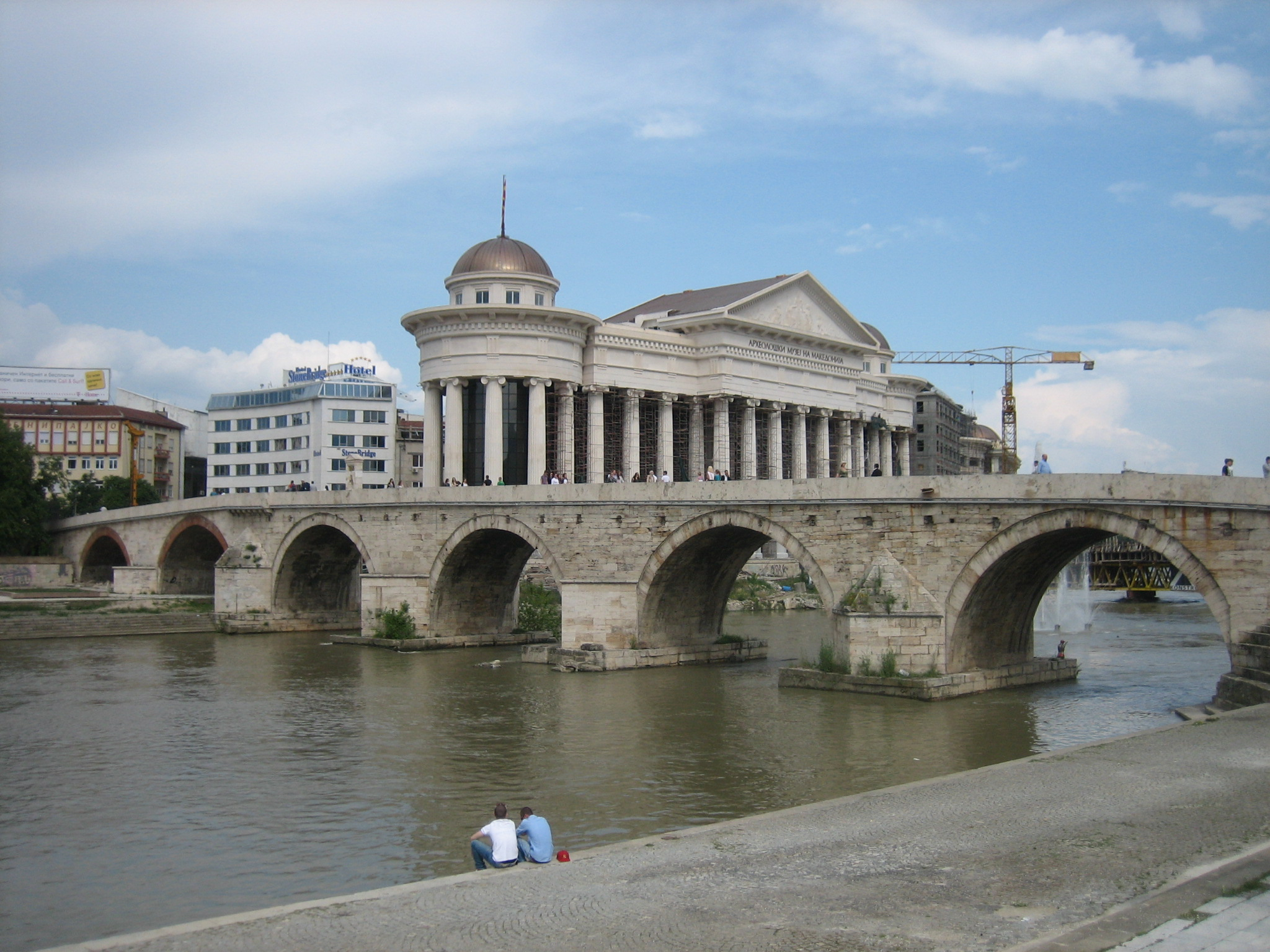
(North Macedonia) Skopje

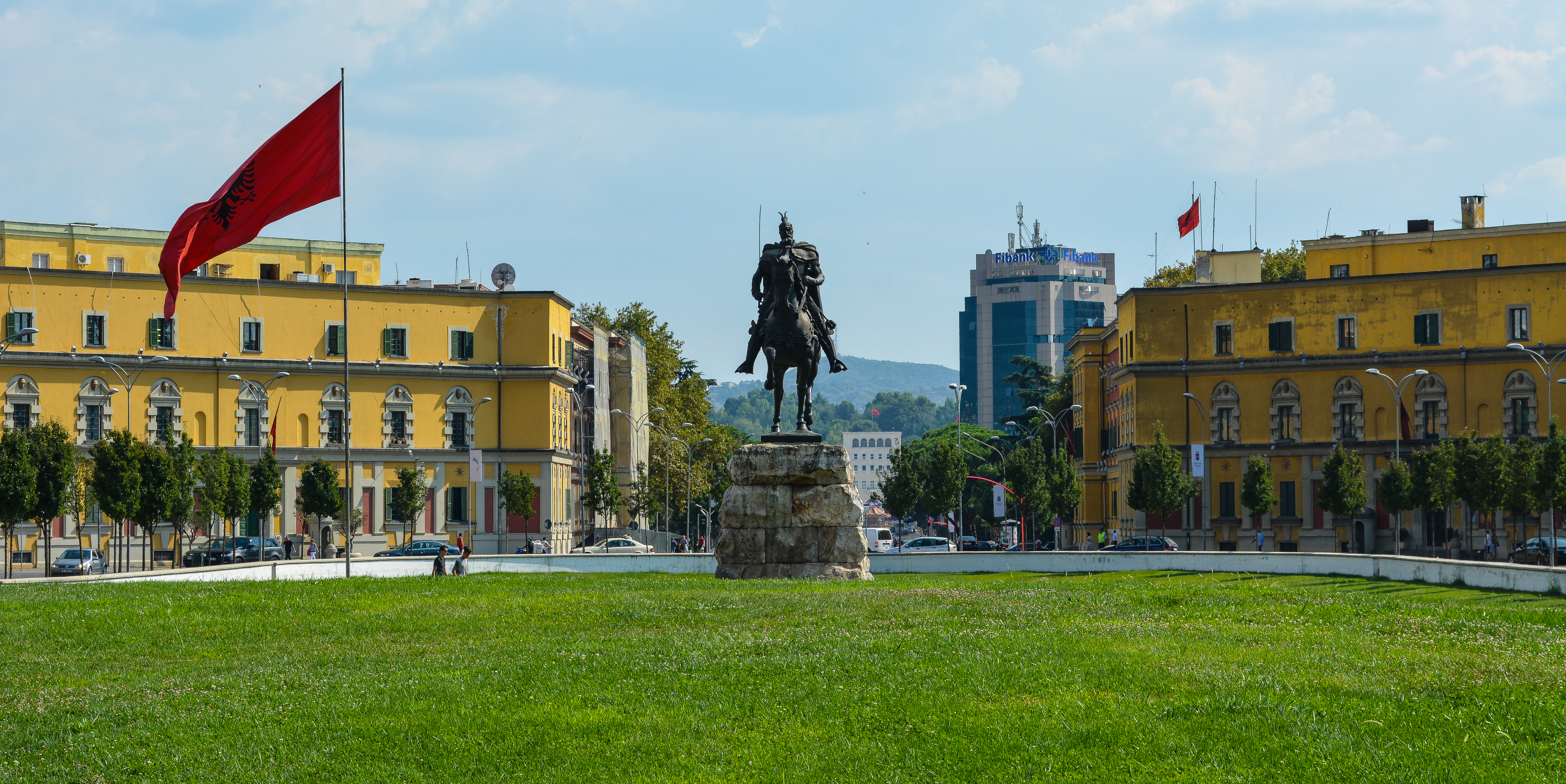
(Albania) Tirana

Based on 2026 estimates, the combined nominal GDP of these countries is $166.970 billion, while the GDP (PPP) is $351.070 billion. The nominal GDP per capita is $15,224 and the GDP (PPP) per capita is $32,010. Albania and North Macedonia would have a higher GDP per capita and GDP PPP per capita within the union compared to their individual averages, while Serbia's individual per capita averages would be slightly higher than the group's combined average. The current currencies are the Albanian lek, the Macedonian denar, and the Serbian dinar.

=== Statistics ===
	Albania	North Macedonia	Serbia
Form of government	Parliamentary republic		
Current heads of state and government	President Bajram Begaj	President Gordana Siljanovska-Davkova	President Ana Brnabić
Current heads of state and government	Prime Minister Edi Rama	Prime Minister Hristijan Mickoski	Prime Minister Đuro Macut
Official languages	Albanian	Macedonian and Albanian	Serbian
GDP (nominal)	$33.330 billion	$21.610 billion	$112.030 billion
GDP (nominal) per capita	$12,499	$11,967	$17,253
GDP (PPP)	$67.300 billion	$57.320 billion	$226.380 billion
GDP (PPP) per capita	$25,224	$31,747	$34,862
Real GDP growth rate (2024–26)	4%, 3.79%, 3.4%	3%, 3.5%, 3.1%	3.9%, 2%, 2,8%,
Currency	Lek	Denar	Dinar
Average salary	€843	€745	€992

== Further cooperation ==
On 2 August 2021, the directors of the post offices of Serbia and North Macedonia, Zoran Đorđević and Jani Makraduli, signed in Belgrade a Protocol for business cooperation.

On 3 August 2021, by an order of the President of Serbia Aleksandar Vučić, four helicopters of the Ministry of Internal Affairs of Serbia have been sent to help colleagues from Ministry of Internal Affairs of North Macedonia for firefighting in North Macedonia.

On 12 May 2022, Serbian Minister of Trade, Tourism, and Telecommunications, Tatjana Matić, talked in Tirana with Albanian Minister of Tourism and Environment, Mirela Kumbaro, about cooperation within the "Open Balkans" initiative, with an emphasis on removing barriers and reaching an agreement in the field of tourism.

== See also ==
- Accession of Bosnia and Herzegovina to the European Union – Ongoing process of joining the EU
- Accession of Kosovo to the European Union
- Accession of Montenegro to the European Union – Ongoing accession process of Montenegro to the EU
- Albania–Kosovo relations
  - Kosovo Albanians – Ethnic group in the Balkans
  - Unification of Albania and Kosovo – Political idea
- Albania–North Macedonia relations
  - Albanians in North Macedonia – Ethnic group
  - Ilirida – Proposed autonomy within the state of North Macedonia
- Albania–Serbia relations
  - Agreement on the path to normalization between Kosovo and Serbia (2023)
  - Albania–Yugoslavia relations
  - Balkania (proposed state)
- Balkan Federation – Proposed country
- Balkan Wars (1912–1913)
- Balkanization – Fragmentation of a country or region
- Berlin Process – European intergovernmental initiative
- Foreign relations of Albania
- Foreign relations of Serbia
- Kosovo–Serbia relations
  - Kosovo Serbs – Ethnic group
  - Partition of Kosovo – Proposals for the division of Kosovo
  - Serb enclaves in Kosovo
- Regional Roaming Agreement – Balkan agreement on mobile roaming charges
- Yugoslav Wars – 1991–2001 series of wars in the Balkans
  - Dayton Agreement – 1995 treaty ending the Bosnian War
  - International sanctions against the Federal Republic of Yugoslavia – International embargo imposed by the United Nations during the Yugoslav Wars
  - Kosovo War – 1998–1999 armed conflict in the Balkans
  - NATO bombing of Yugoslavia – 1999 military operation
