= International rankings of Denmark =

Here is a list of international rankings of Denmark, in terms of Economic, Environmental, Military, Political, and Social aspects.

== Economic ==
- World Bank: Gini Index — ranking 18th out of 168 countries/ regions (2021)
- The Heritage Foundation: Index of Economic Freedom — ranking 9th out of 177 countries/ regions (2024)
- International Monetary Fund: Gross Domestic Product (GDP) (Nominal) — ranking 37th out of 188 countries/ regions (2024)
- International Monetary Fund: GDP per capita in purchasing power parity — ranking 11th out of 181 countries/ regions (2024)
- World Bank: Gross National Income (PPP) per capita — ranking 9th out of 190 countries/ regions (2022)
- United Nations Development Programme: Human Development Index ranking 16th out of 187 countries/ regions (2022)
- Gallup World Poll: The World's Happiest Countries — ranking 2nd out of 137 countries/ regions (2023)
- World Economic Forum: Global Competitiveness Report — ranked 2 out of 141 countries/ regions (2020)

== Environmental ==
- Yale University: Environmental Sustainability Index — ranked 1st out of 180 countries (2022)

== Military ==
- Institute for Economics and Peace: Global Peace Index — ranked 2nd out of 163 countries (2023)

== Political ==
- Fund for Peace: Fragile States Index ranked 174th out of 177 countries - Sustainable (2023)
- Transparency International: Corruption Perceptions Index ranked 1 out of 180 (2010)
- Reporters Without Borders: Press Freedom Index ranked 11 out of 178 (2010)
- The Economist: Democracy Index ranked 3 out of 167 (2010)

== Social ==
- Economist Intelligence Unit: Where-to-be-born Index, ranked 5 out of 80 (2013)
- Social Progress Index: ranked 2 out of 163 countries (2020)
- University of Leicester: Satisfaction with Life Index 2006, ranked 1 out of 178 countries
- OECD: Physicians per 1000 Population 2007, ranked 15 out of 30 countries

== Technology ==
- World Intellectual Property Organization: Global Innovation Index 2026, ranked 9 out of 139 countries
