= List of protected areas of Lejre Municipality =

This list of protected areas of Lejre Municipality lists protected areas of Lejre Municipality, Denmark.

== List ==
Image	Locality	Size	Year	Coordinates	Description	Source
	Bognæs	476´ha	1969			Ref
	Gevninge Church					Ref
	Herslev Church					Ref
	Kirke Hvalsø Church					Ref
	Ledreborg	1800 ha	1973			Ref
	Ledreborg Forests	326 ha	1973			Ref
	Lindholm Gods	476 ha	1969			Ref
	Lejre Vig	100 ha	1937–62			Ref
	Nørre Hvalsø-Kisserup	1132 ha	1980			Ref
	Ryegård Gods og omegn	1181 ha	1958			Ref
	Særløse og Skov-Hastrup Overdrev	1952–1969	371 ha			Ref
	Sonnerupgård Gods	280 ha	1966			Ref
	Uglestrup Mose	36 ha	1983			Ref
