= List of protected areas of Frederikssund Municipality =

This list of protected areas in Frederikssund Municipality lists protected areas in Frederikssund Municipality, Denmark.

== List ==
Image	Locality	Size	Year	Coordinates	Description	Source
	Dyssegården, Orebjerg and Landerslev Strand	61 ha	1974			
	Ejby Ådal og kystskrænterne	35 ha	1952/1996			
	Ejby Bro	7 ha	1975			
	Hammer Bakker	487 ha	1969			
	Kignæs Havn	1,5 ha	1952			
	Kulhuse	C. 25 ha	1963			
	Lille Rørbæk	390 ha	1997			
	Mademosegård	10 ha	1972			
	Selsø Sø	768 he	1948/1969			
	Skuldelev Ås	100 ha	1951			
	Østby Flak and Hammerdybet	C. 150 ha	1967			
