= Telmore =

Danish mobile virtual network operator

Telmore A/S is the largest mobile virtual network operator (MVNO) in Denmark headquartered in Taastrup.

== Overview ==
Telmore was created in 2000, and was among the first Discount MVNOs in the world to use the Internet as the primary sales and service channel. Several studies have been made on the disruptive effects Telmore had on the Danish telecom market in the early 2000s. As of January 27, 2004, Telmore A/S became a subsidiary of TDC A/S. By the end of 2010, Telmore had a 10.4% mobile market share, totaling more than 700.000 subscribers.
