= Telecommunications in the European Union =

Set index article

Telecommunications in the European Union may refer to telecommunications in the 27 member states of the European Union:

- Telecommunications in Austria
- Telecommunications in Belgium
- Telecommunications in Bulgaria
- Telecommunications in Croatia
- Telecommunications in Cyprus
- Telecommunications in the Czech Republic
- Telecommunications in Denmark
- Telecommunications in Estonia
- Telecommunications in Finland
- Telecommunications in France
- Telecommunications in Germany
- Telecommunications in Greece
- Telecommunications in Hungary
- Telecommunications in the Republic of Ireland
- Telecommunications in Italy
- Telecommunications in Latvia
- Telecommunications in Lithuania
- Telecommunications in Luxembourg
- Telecommunications in Malta
- Telecommunications in the Netherlands
- Telecommunications in Poland
- Telecommunications in Portugal
- Telecommunications in Romania
- Telecommunications in Slovakia
- Telecommunications in Slovenia
- Telecommunications in Spain
- Telecommunications in Sweden
