= List of protected areas of Halsnæs Municipality =

This list of protected areas in Halsnæs Municipality lists protected areas in Halsnæs Municipality, Denmark.

== List ==
Image	Locality	Size	Year	Coordinates	Description	Source
	Arrenakke Bakker	59 ha	1998			Ref
	Arrenæs					Ref
	Frederiksværk: Canal		1967			Ref
	Frederiksværk: Meadow	22 ha	1963			Ref
	Kappelhøjkilen og Bakkestien	128 ha	2005			Ref
	Lindbjerg	C. 1.3 ha	1946			Ref
	Melby Gravhøje	13 ha	1969			Ref
	Melby Overdrev	145 ha	1930			Ref
	Orehøj	16 ha	1969			Ref
	Skuldeklinten at Lynæs	63 ha	2004			Ref
