= Geology of Denmark =

The geology of Denmark varies, with the country itself consisting of a peninsula of mainland Europe and a number of islands in the Baltic Sea. Greenland and the Faroe Islands are also Danish territory, with Greenland geologically part of North America and the Faroes geologically similar to Iceland. The geological features of Denmark itself include 12 kilometers of unmetamorphosed sediments lying atop the Precambrian Fennoscandian Shield, the Norwegian-Scottish Caledonides and buried North German-Polish Caledonides. The stable Fennoscandian Shield formed from 1.45 billion years ago to 850 million years ago in the Proterozoic. The Fennoscandian Border Zone is a large fault, bounding the deep basement rock of the Danish Basin—a trough between the Border Zone and the Ringkøbing-Fyn High. The Sorgenfrei-Tornquist Zone is a fault-bounded area displaying Cretaceous-Cenozoic inversion.

== Geologic history, stratigraphy, and tectonics ==
=== Paleozoic (539-251 million years ago) ===
Cambrian rocks record successive marine transgression and regression events. Feldspar-rich red bed sandstones deposited in windy floodplains followed by layers of glauconite-rich marine sandstones and offshore siltstone. Black alum shales deposited in the mid-Cambrian in a nearly anoxic epeiric basin with limestone layers, rich in trilobite fossils. Condensed, shallow limestone succeeded the black shales in the Ordovician, with numerous graptolite fossils.

Devonian rocks have never been found in Denmark and marine Carboniferous rocks are only known from drill holes at the southern edge of the Ringkobing-Fyn High, which formed at the time as a bulging area north of the Variscan collision zone.

Rotational block faulting in the Late Carboniferous resulted from Variscan wrench deformation, active along the Sorgenfrei-Tornquist Zone. Syn-rift clastic wedges began to accumulate in an emerging half-graben. Continental red beds were deposited and volcanism occurred.

Regional sagging began in the mid-Permian, leaving the Ringkobing-Fyn High as a high point. Marine transgression began, connecting the region with a narrow seaway to the Shetland Islands. The Danish Basin and the neighboring North German Basin were both highly saline and brackish, leaving behind carbonate and anhydrite layers on the southern edge of the High. Up to 1.2 kilometers of halite accumulated in the North Permian Basin, thinning toward the Fennoscandian Border Zone. Subsequent salt tectonism has produced salt diapirs 10 kilometers in diameter, rising five kilometers through overhead rock and some are less than 200 meters deep in Quaternary rocks.

=== Mesozoic (251-66 million years ago) ===
North-south rifting with the breakup of Pangea in the Triassic segmented the Ringkobing-Fyn High into a narrow graben. Sedimentation occurred in fault-bounded alluvial fan deposits with occasional small marine transgressions, such as the Muschekalk Sea in the mid-Triassic in the Ringkobing-Fyn High. Triassic outcrops are only found on southern shore of Bornholm. Extensional faulting occurred throughout the Mesozoic, but overall, conditions remained the same into the Cretaceous. Oscillating marine transgressions in the Rhaetian to Middle Jurassic shifted deposition from delta sands to offshore mudstones and regional updoming took place at the junction of the Central Graben, Moray Firth and Viking Graben. Deltas were drowned and replaced with deepwater basins. Major rifting in the Late Jurassic produced block tilting.

Sedimentation shifted in Albian through Danian times from siliclastic to carbonaceous, marked by marl and glauconite sandstones. Sea level fell in the Maastrichtian, restricting the sea to deeper areas of the Central Graben. The Stevns Klint type locality contains the Fish Clay with an iridium anomaly indicative of the K-Pg mass extinction.

=== Cenozoic (66 million years ago-present) ===
During the Danian Stage, carbonate deposition stopped, resulting in an erosional unconformity. As the Selandian transgressive phase got underway, glauconite sand and older, reworked Cretaceous and Devonian sediments were deposited, overlain by pelagic smectite clay. Erosion in the Neogene and Pleistocene has eroded most rock units that would likely have indicated open marine conditions. A break in sedimentation in the Oligocene was followed by a marine transgression and sediment accumulated in the Danish Basin, with significant coarse quartz sand compared to older Paleogene clays.

The deepest point of deposition—the depocenter—moved toward the North Sea and Central Graben during the Oligocene and the coastline shifted to the Fennoscandian Border Zone in Jylland. This was a result of regional uplift of the Norwegian Caledonides and the Fennoscandian Shield. The Caledonides were eroded to a nearly flat peneplain by the Permian and so the uplift was non-orogenic and comparatively recent. Shallow marine deposition continued until the Pleistocene with increasing sand and coal from the Miocene. Up to three kilometers of sand accumulated in the Central Graben.

During the Pleistocene, the region was glaciated multiple times, leaving glaciofluvial plains in the west and clay soils in the east. Isostatic rebound and post-glacial thin-skinned folding and thrusting have been common geologic forces in the Holocene.

== Natural resource geology ==
Denmark has few natural resources although some small oil and gas fields have been found offshore since the 1970s. Gravel, sand, and chalk are all mined for building material and in North Jylland, plastic clay and diatomite are extracted as insulation material.
