= Telecommunications in Denmark =

Telecommunications in Denmark encompasses a well-developed network of internet, telephone services, and broadcasting stations. Denmark has high internet connectivity and widespread mobile broadband adoption.

The European Commission's Digital Economy and Society Index (DESI) from 2022 identifies Denmark as a leader in Europe's digital advancement. With a ranking of first in connectivity, Denmark's 98% 5G coverage significantly exceeds the EU average of 66%. In digital technology integration, it is second, notable for the adoption of AI (24%), cloud technologies (62%), and big data (27%) by its businesses, almost doubling the EU averages. In human capital, Denmark ranks fifth, displaying progress in closing the gender gap with 23% of its Information and Communication Technology (ICT) workforce being female, higher than the EU’s 19%. Additionally, in digital public services, where Denmark ranks eighth, a notable 93% of its population uses e-government services, substantially exceeding the EU's 65%.

== Infrastructure ==
The Denmark telecommunications network consists of buried and submarine cables and a microwave radio relay form trunk network, as well as four cellular radio communications systems.

There are 18 submarine fiber-optic cables linking Denmark with Norway, Sweden, Russia, Poland, Germany, the Netherlands, United Kingdom, Faroe Islands, Iceland, and Canada. There are also a number of satellite earth stations providing an international communications link – 6 Intelsa, 10 Eutelsat, 1 Orion, 1 Inmarsat (Blaavand-Atlantic-East). The Nordic countries share the Danish earth station and the Eik, Rogaland station for worldwide Inmarsat access.

Denmark has a highly developed telecommunications infrastructure. At the beginning of 2025, the country had 9.07 million cellular mobile connections, equivalent to 151% of the population, while internet penetration stood at 99%. Median download speeds were 162.22 Mbit/s on mobile networks and 237.95 Mbit/s on fixed connections. In 2024, 5G accounted for 78.5% of mobile broadband subscriptions, while fiber continued to expand its share of fixed broadband connections.

== Internet ==
=== Fixed broadband ===
The 2022 DESI report highlights Denmark's leadership in internet connectivity and infrastructure. Notably, 95% of households benefit from Very High-Capacity Networks (VHCNs), securing Denmark's top position among the 27 EU Member States and ranking it third-highest in the EU for household VHCN coverage. Fiber to the Premises (FTTP) coverage has steadily increased from 70% to 74%, with rural areas rising sharply to 77.8%, surpassing the EU average of 50%. Fixed broadband adoption rates for households stand at 84%, slightly above the EU average of 78%. Denmark's broadband strategy, initiated in 2021, aims to provide all households and businesses with 100/30 Mbps connections by 2025 and targets 98% coverage for 1 Gbps speeds.

=== Mobile broadband ===
In 2021, Denmark's mobile broadband adoption stands at 97%, exceeding the EU average of 87%. The country has also achieved considerable progress in 5G deployment, with 99% of the harmonized 5G spectrum already allocated, in sharp contrast to the EU average of 56%. As a result, Denmark has a 98% 5G coverage for households, the highest in the EU and well above the EU average of 66%. All major mobile operators in Denmark offer 5G subscriptions for both retail and commercial customers.

=== Integration of digital technology ===
The country is ranked 2nd in the EU for the integration of digital technology in businesses. Notably, 79% of Danish Small and Medium-sized Enterprises (SMEs) have achieved at least a basic level of digital intensity, compared to the EU average of 55% in 2021. In the area of big data analysis, 27% of Danish enterprises engage in this practice, which is nearly twice the EU average of 14%. Cloud computing services are used by 62% of enterprises in Denmark, which exceeds the EU's 34%, and the use of Artificial Intelligence (AI) by Danish enterprises stands at 24%, notably higher than the EU average of 8%. Additionally, the adoption of e-invoices by Danish enterprises is at 57%, exceeding the EU average of 32%.

On the aspect of ICT for environmental sustainability, 54% of Danish enterprises report medium or high intensity of green action through ICT, which is below the EU average of 66%.

=== Digital public services ===
Denmark holds the 8th position in the EU concerning digital public services, supported by an e-government user rate of 93%, which exceeds the EU average of 65%. The country's digital public services for citizens and businesses receive scores of 83 and 89 out of 100, respectively, surpassing the EU averages of 75 and 82. Denmark's open data usage stands at 91%, which is higher than the EU average of 81%.

The country has implemented mandatory digital self-service solutions since 2012, giving citizens access to over 2,000 digital service solutions. The country has a comprehensive e-ID infrastructure, serving over 95% of the population and facilitating various digital services. Denmark has modernized its digital communication system known as 'digital Post,' with over 90% of individuals and 800,000 companies now using the new platform to receive mail from public authorities.

== Telephones ==
Denmark has an excellent telephone system network. There are 2.4 million (June 2006) main lines and 5.6 million (June 2006) mobile phones in use.

== Radio ==
There are two AM radio broadcast stations in Denmark, 355 FM stations, and one DAB station with 17 channels as of 2005.

== See also ==
- Internet censorship in Denmark
