= Digital Economy and Society Index =

Measure of Europe's digital performance

The Digital Economy and Society Index (DESI) monitors Europe's overall digital performance and tracks the progress of European Union (EU) countries regarding their digital competitiveness. On an annual basis, it monitors the performance of member states in digital connectivity, digital skills, online activity and digital public services in order to assess the state of digitalization of each member state as well as to identify areas requiring priority investment and action.

Beginning in 2023, the DESI was integrated into the European Commission's annual State of the Digital Decade report, aligning its methodology with the Digital Decade Policy Programme 2030 targets. The modernized DESI framework tracks collective EU progress through four revised dimensions:

1. Digital skills (basic and advanced digital competencies)
2. Digital infrastructure (connectivity, edge nodes, and broadband)
3. Digitalisation of businesses (adoption of advanced technologies and e-commerce)
4. Digitalisation of public services (e-government and digital public administration)

Prior to this shift, the 2022 DESI methodology encompassed four similar dimensions:

1. Human capital (internet user skills, advanced skills and development)
2. Connectivity (fixed and mobile broadband, broadband prices)
3. Integration of digital technology (digital intensity, digital technologies for business, e-commerce)
4. Digital public services (e-government)

== Methodology 2022 ==
The 2022 Digital Economy and Society Index (DESI) utilizes a structured methodology to evaluate the EU's digital advancement, employing a bottom-up aggregation approach that applies simple weighted arithmetic averages in accordance with its index structure. This methodology organizes the evaluation into four principal dimensions, which are further broken down into 10 sub-dimensions and encompass a total of 32 indicators. The allocation of weightings across these four dimensions is outlined in Table 1.

For instance, the DESI score for a given country C was calculated as follows:

DESI(C) = Human_Capital(C) * 0.25 + Connectivity(C) * 0.25 + Integration_of_Digital_Technology(C) * 0.25 + Digital_Public_Services(C) * 0.25.

Where Connectivity(C) represents the score achieved by country C in the Connectivity dimension.

Table 1: Weights attributed to the DESI dimensions
Dimension	Weight
1. Human Capital	25%
2. Connectivity	25%
3. Integration of Digital Technology	25%
4. Digital Public Services	25%

Source: Digital Economy and Society Index (DESI) 2022 - Methodological Note

== Human Capital ==
=== From 2022 ===
The "Human Capital" dimension assesses the proficiency in digital skills among the general populace and professionals in the field of Information and Communication Technology (ICT), based on a series of indicators from Eurostat. This assessment encompasses the proportion of individuals possessing either basic or above basic competencies in critical areas such as information management, communication, problem-solving, digital content creation, and online safety. Additionally, it quantifies the percentage of the workforce categorized as ICT specialists, alongside the representation of women within this group, thereby indicating the gender diversity in the tech sector. The dimension further evaluates the prevalence of ICT training programs within enterprises and the ratio of graduates holding ICT degrees. These metrics collectively serve to evaluate the digital literacy and specialized technical skills across the EU, aligning with the aims of the Digital Decade Compass.

=== Prior to 2022 ===
The COVID-19 pandemic demonstrated how important digitalization has become to our economies and how basic and advanced digital skills have the ability to sustain our societies. While 85% of EU citizens used the internet prior to coronavirus pandemic, only 58% possessed at best some basic digital skills, which serve as the backbone of the digital society as without any digital skills, one cannot fully benefit from the use of digital technologies. The pandemic may have positively affected the number of internet users, but the development of digital skills did not come naturally with it. While basic usage skills allow individuals to take part in the digital society and consume digital goods and services, advanced skills can help empowering the workforce to develop new digital goods and services.

The human capital dimension of the index is divided into two sub-dimensions covering internet user skills and advanced skills and development. The former is a take on the commission's Digital Skills Indicator, which is calculated based on the number and complexity of activities that involve the use of digital devices and the internet. The latter sub-dimension deals with the workforce and its potential to work in as well as develop the digital economy. This takes into account the share of people in the workforce that poses ICT specialist skills and includes a separate indicator on female ICT specialists. Concurrently, it looks at the share of ICT graduates.

== Connectivity ==
=== From 2022 ===
The "Connectivity" dimension evaluates the EU's fixed and mobile broadband infrastructure through indicators measuring availability, adoption, and affordability. Key metrics include the percentage of households subscribing to fixed broadband, with specific attention to high-speed connections of at least 100 Mbps and ultra-fast connections of at least 1 Gbps. Coverage indicators assess the presence of Next Generation Access (NGA) broadband capable of at least 30 Mbps download speeds, the extent of Fixed Very High Capacity Network (VHCN) coverage incorporating technologies like Fiber to the Home (FTTH), Fiber to the Building (FTTB), and advanced cable systems. Additionally, the dimension examines the 5G spectrum allocation for next-generation mobile networks, the coverage of populated areas by 5G, and the usage of mobile broadband by individuals. The Broadband Price Index compares prices of various broadband offers, providing a measure of service affordability. These indicators aim to quantify the supply and demand for broadband services, as well as retail prices, within the context of targets set by the Digital Decade Compass.

=== Prior to 2022 ===
The connectivity dimension of DESI index takes both the fixed and mobile broadband into account. Under the former, it evaluates the uptake of overall and ultrafast broadband of at least 100 Mbit/s, the availability of fast broadband with the next generation access and of fixed very high capacity networks (VHCNs). In addition, it considers the prices of retail offers. The latter being mobile broadband is concerned with 4G coverage, the uptake of mobile broadband (3G and 4G) and 5G readiness.

Broadband network deployments must keep pace with the rapidly growing internet traffic on fixed and mobile networks. Although the European Union has full coverage of basic broadband infrastructure, only 44% of households benefit from VHCN connectivity, which consists of fiber to the x (FTTX) and cable DOCSIS 3.1 technologies. Since FTTX and cable mostly concentrated in urban areas, connectivity in rural areas remains low with 20% of households. Countries scoring best on VHCN coverage, i.e. more than 90% coverage, are Denmark, Luxembourg and Malta. Conversely, in Greece, the UK, Cyprus and Austria less than 20% of households have access.

In 2016, European Commission took on The 5G Action Plan for Europe and provided the objective to deploy 5G network services in all European countries towards the end of 2020. 5G allows for a very high bandwidth and low latency connectivity to internet users as well as smart objects. The adoption of 5G spectrum serves as a necessary prerequisite for the commercial launch of 5G in every member state. Up till now, only 17 member countries have assigned any 5G spectrum and only 21% of the total 5G spectrum amount has been assigned at EU level. The best performing countries include Germany, Italy, Finland and Hungary.

== Integration of Digital Technology ==
=== From 2022 ===
The "Integration of Digital Technology" dimension measures the adoption and integration of digital technologies by enterprises, especially small and medium-sized enterprises (SMEs), based on indicators from Eurostat. This dimension encompasses three sub-dimensions: digital intensity, uptake of selected technologies, and e-commerce. Key indicators include the percentage of SMEs with a basic level of digital intensity, defined by the use of at least four out of twelve selected technologies; the implementation of enterprise resource planning (ERP) software for information sharing across various business functions; the use of social media, big data analysis, cloud computing services, and artificial intelligence (AI) technologies by enterprises; the contribution of ICT to environmental sustainability; the sending of e-invoices; and the engagement of SMEs in online sales, including the proportion of their turnover from e-commerce and their participation in cross-border online sales within the EU. These indicators aim to assess how digital technologies are integrated into business processes, highlighting the targets of achieving a basic level of digital intensity and the adoption of big data, cloud, and AI technologies as outlined by the Digital Decade Compass.

=== Prior to 2022 ===
Digital technologies make possible for companies to gain competitive advantage by improving their services, products and expanding their markets. This digital transformation of businesses furthers the development of new and trustworthy technologies at the same time as revealing new opportunities for them. This dimension of the DESI measure the digitalization of companies and e-commerce activities.

The top performers are Ireland, Finland, Belgium, the Netherlands, Denmark and Sweden with scores greater than 55 points (out of 100). At the other end of the scale, Bulgaria, Romania, Hungary Poland, Greece and Latvia are last with scores less than 35 points, significantly below the EU average, which is 43 points.

The leading countries on ‘4a business digitization’ (i.e. electronic information sharing, social media, big data and cloud) are Finland, the Netherlands and Belgium, with scores above 60 points. Bulgaria, Hungary, Poland, Romania, Latvia and Slovakia lag behind in the adoption of e-business technologies, scoring below 40 points. Ireland, Czechia, Denmark, Belgium and Sweden are the top five countries in ‘4b e-commerce’ (i.e. SMEs selling online, e-commerce turnover and selling online cross-border), with scores above 60 points. Ireland leads in all the three indicators under e-commerce while Bulgaria, Greece, Luxembourg and Romania are the worst countries with scores below 25 points.

== Digital Public Services ==
=== From 2022 ===
The "Digital Public Services" dimension evaluates e-government and open data initiatives using indicators from Eurostat and the eGovernment Benchmark. It examines internet users' interaction with public authorities, the pre-filling of data in online forms, the availability of online services for major life events and business operations, and the effectiveness of open data policies, including national data portal functionality.

=== Prior to 2022 ===
The last part of DESI revolves around e-Government. More specifically, it is measuring supply and demand side of digital public services, open data, pre-filled forms, completeness of online service, user centricity, key enablers such as electronic identification, eDocuments, authentic sources and digital post, and some other indicators.

== Use of Internet Services ==
=== From 2022 ===
In the 2022 Digital Economy and Society Index (DESI) methodology, "Use of Internet Services" is no longer categorized as an independent dimension.

=== Prior to 2022 ===
Engaging in a very wide range of online activities is possible for those citizens with an internet connection and the necessary skills to take advantage of it. Prior to the COVID-19 pandemic, already 85% of the citizens used the Internet already but, this crisis, has helped this percentage increase along with the interactions these users commit on the network. This dimension of the DESI calculates the number of people that uses the internet and what activities they perform online. Among them, some examples are the consumption of online content (e.g. entertainment such as music, movies, TV or games, obtaining media-rich information or engaging in online social interaction), using modern communication activities (e.g. taking part in video calls), and transaction activities such as online shopping and banking.

In the EU there are still a lot of differences in between member countries regarding the use of internet services. Finland, Sweden, the Netherlands and Denmark are the countries with the most active internet users, followed by the UK, Malta, Estonia and Ireland. In the other hand, Romania, Bulgaria and Italy are the least active ones. Ireland and Spain were the Member States that registered the biggest improvement in this dimension in comparison to previous years.

Using the internet for listening to music, playing games or watching videos is still the most common activity (81% of individuals who used internet in the last 3 months). Reading news online is the second most popular activity shown in the DESI (72%), while two thirds of internet users shop (71%) or bank online (66%).

== Ranking 2022 ==
DESI 2022
Position	Land
1	Finland
2	Denmark
3	Netherlands
4	Sweden
5	Republic of Ireland
6	Malta
7	Spain
8	Luxembourg
9	Estonia
10	Austria
11	Slovenia
12	France
13	Germany
14	Lithuania
15	Portugal
16	Belgium
17	Latvia
18	Italy
19	Czech Republic
20	Cyprus
21	Croatia
22	Hungary
23	Slovakia
24	Poland
25	Greece
26	Bulgaria
27	Romania
