= List of protected areas of Gribskov Municipality =

This list of protected areas of Gribskov Municipality lists protected areas of Gribskov Municipality, Denmark.

== List ==
Image	Locality	Size	Year	Coordinates	Description	Source
	Annisse: Northwestern outskirts	7 ha	1975			Ref
	Arresø shoreline at Ryeng		1951			Ref
	Blistrup Church: Surroundings					Ref
	Dragstrup	9 ha	1972			Ref
	Gilbjerg, Gilbjerghoved and Gilbjergstien		1963			Ref
	Gilleleje Veststrand	19 ha	1993			Ref
	Heatherhill	35 ha	1960			Ref
	Hyrdegården		1970			Ref
	Maglehøje		1961/1964			Ref
	Nakkehoved	37 ha	2002			Ref
	Ramløse: Surroundings		1961–79			Ref
	Ryengen	28 ha	1982			Ref
	Rusland and Pandehave Å		1993			Ref
	Røde Kilde	2 ha	1938			Ref
	Rågeleje Plantage		1943			Ref
	Rågeleje: Cliffs		1941			Ref
	Smidstrup Strand		1963			Ref
	Søborg Church: Surroundings					Ref
	Tibirke Bakker and Ellemosen		1924–79			Ref
	Udsholt Strand		1979			Ref
	Ørby Bavnehøj		1922			Ref
