= List of protected areas of Hillerød Municipality =

This list of protected areas of Hillerød Municipality is a list of protected areas of Hillerød Municipality, Denmark.

== List ==
Image	Locality	Size	Year	Coordinates	Description	Source
	Asminderød Church					Ref
	Bavnebakke and Bøgebakke	0.8 ha	1943			Ref
	Frederiksborg Palace and gardens		1963			Ref
	Gadevang Mose and Hovmosen	6.6 ha	1951			Ref
	Grønholt Church					Ref
	Hejreholm	125 ha	1971			Ref
	Holmene		1974			Ref
	Lille Lyngby Mose	235 ha	1989			Ref
	Møllekrogen	50 ha	1971			Ref
	Nejede Vestskov	5.5 ha	1971			Ref
	Nødebo; View of Lake Esrum		1940			Ref
	Nordisk Lejrskole		1975			Ref
	Skansebakken		1938			Ref
	Strø Bjerge	254 ha	1981			Ref
	Strødam Reserve	160 ha	1925			Ref
	Tjæreby Church					Ref
