= Jakup Kardović =

Bosniak Muslim cleric and commander

Mullah Jakup Kardović Effendi
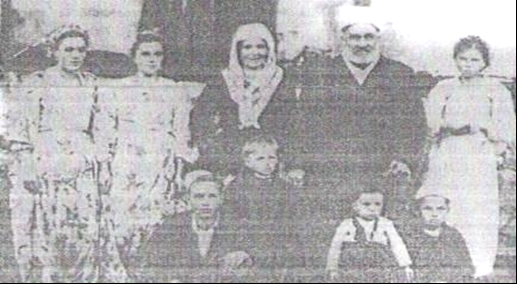
- Jakup Kardović with his family
- Born: 10 March 1869; Biševo, Rožaje, Ottoman Empire
- Died: 11 February 1945 (aged 75); Rožaje, Yugoslavia (modern-day Montenegro)
- Military career
- Allegiance: Germany; Italy
- Service years: 1941–1945
- Unit: detachment of Sandžak Muslim militia from Rožaje
- Conflicts: World War II in Yugoslavia: Battle for Novi Pazar

Mullah Jakup Kardović (or Kardo; Albanian: Jakup Kombi; nom de guerre: Kombi) (10 March 1869 – 11 February 1945) was an bosniak Muslim cleric and during WWII a commander of a detachment of the Muslim militia in Rožaje, his native region. In November 1941, Kardović distinguished himself during the Battle for Novi Pazar, when he defended the city against the attacking Chetniks.

== During World War II ==
Mullah Jakup was born in the village of Biševo, which is some 4-5 kilometers close to the city of Rožaje. He belonged to a group of notable Albanians from Sandžak.

During WWII, he joined the Sandžak Muslim militia. In November 1941, Kardović participated in the Battle for Novi Pazar when the Chetniks alongside the Partisans attempted to capture the city of Novi Pazar. Together with forces of Aćif Hadžiahmetović, Džemail Koničanin and Bilall Dreshaj as well as some volunteers led by Shaban Polluzha, his forces attacked the rear flanks of the Chetniks which caused them to retreat, ensuring the successful defence of the city and contributing to the victory of the defending forces.

Yugoslav Partisan historians have a generally negative attitude towards Kardoić, who was executed by them after WWII. The Yugoslav Partisans claim that the Axis forces rewarded Jakup for the actions he undertook with Adem Kurtagić and Šefko Bećiragić, when all Orthodox villages were burnt and their population massacred. During one night, they killed 17 members of Bulatović family in Bjela Crkva and 16 members of Beloica family from Bukovica. Mirko Ćuković (1064) claims that armed bands from the city killed dozens of Serbs in Novi Pazar in only a couple of hours. Dreshaj's men carried severed heads stuck on the bayonets of their rifles and threw them in the garbage. To prevent further killings, Mulla Jakub proposed to imprison all Serbs older than 18 years. Ahmetović accepted this proposal with the intention to use imprisoned Serbs as hostages in the future negotiations with Chetniks. On 3 February 1944 the units of the Muslim militia under command of Mullah Jakup and also Bilall Dreshaj, Sinan Salković and Faik Bahtijarević attacked villages around Kolašin. They were supported by Balli Kombëtar forces from Drenica.

On the other hand Albanian sources stress that after the Battle of Novi Pazar Kardović personally protected from revenge killings 420 Serbs whose families had links to Chetniks.

At the end of the Second World War, Kardović was executed by the Yugoslav partisans. He was executed without trial and without the ability to defend himself before court at the age of 75. His funeral was attended by many locals of Rožaje.

== Post-Yugoslav re-evaluation ==
For local Muslims in Sandžak, the image of Kardović was very different from his portrayal in official Yugoslav history. After the end of Yugoslavia, local attitudes started to be articulated more openly, even more so after the independence of Montenegro (2006) where Rožaje is located. The Bosniak Cultural Community organized a commemorative manifestation in honor of Kardović on 2 June 2013, the International Scientific conference "Mullah Jakub Kardović". Even if there was an initiative to name the city square after Jakup Kardović, it did not happen, and today the city square does not bear his name.

On 29 June 2022, he was ordained by the President of Albania, "Knight of the Order of Skanderbeg" Albanian: Kalorës i Udhërit të Skënderbeut "for his contribution for the defense from assimilation and elimination of the Albanian in the Serbo-Croat-Slovene Kingdom, for the defense of Albanian territories and for the defense of the Albanian and Bosniak population who were at risk of ethnic cleansing by the Chetnik bands".

== Sources ==
- Ćuković, Mirko (1964). Sandžak. Nolit-Prosveta.
