= Kosovo during World War II =

History of Kosovo 1941 - 1945

World War II in Kosovo
- Part of World War II in Yugoslavia and World War II in Albania
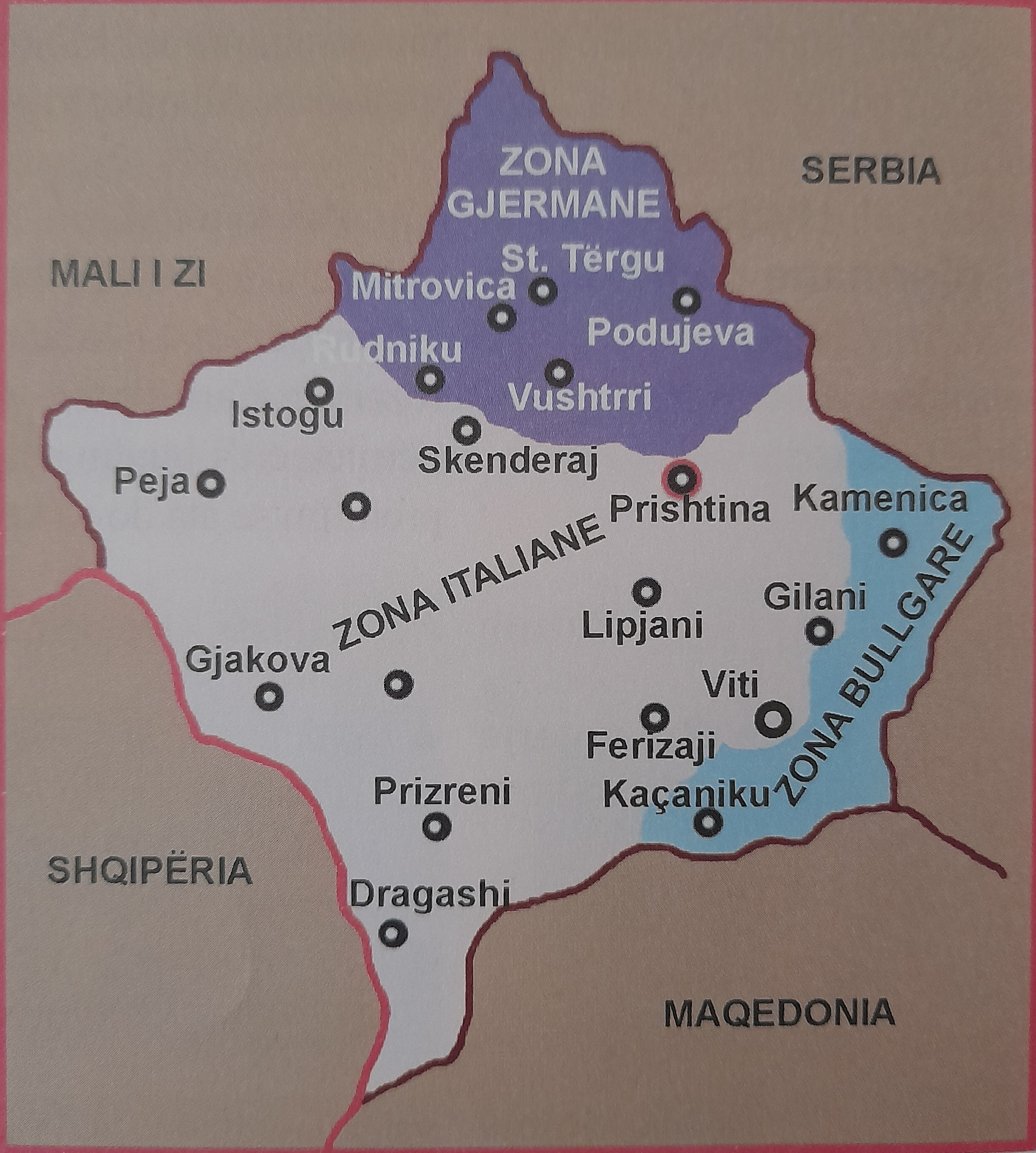
- During World War II, Kosovo was divided into three occupation zones: Italian, German, and Bulgarian.
Date	11 April 1941 – 22 November 1944
Location	Kosovo
Result	Yugoslav–Allied victory
Territorial changes	Liberation of Kosovo and integration of Kosovo into Yugoslavia

Belligerents
Balli Kombëtar (1943–1944); Albania; Albanian People's League; Second League of Prizren; Vulnetari; Supported by: Kingdom of Italy (1941–1943); Germany	Yugoslav Partisans; Chetniks (1941); Albanian National Liberation Movement; Balli Kombëtar (1941–1943) (Tsardom of Bulgaria (1908–1946)) Kingdom of Bulgaria (1944)	Chetniks (1942–1945); Pećanac Chetniks (Tsardom of Bulgaria (1908–1946)) Kingdom of Bulgaria (1941–1943; Supported by: (Government of National Salvation) Serbian State Guard; Kingdom of Italy (Nazi Germany) Germany

Commanders and leaders
(Nazi Germany) Alexander Löhr (executed) (Nazi Germany) August Schmidhuber; Midhat Frashëri (surrendered); Prenk Pervizi; Bedri Pejani (POW); Rexhep Mitrovica; Xhafer Deva; Mulla Idriz Gjilani; Sulë Hotla (1944); Sak Faslia †; Shaban Polluzha; Mehmet Gradica; Miftar Bajraktari; Bislim Bajgora	(Tsardom of Bulgaria (1908–1946)) Kimon Georgiev (Tsardom of Bulgaria (1908–1946)) Kiril Stanchev (Yugoslav Partisans) Ramiz Sadiku (executed) (Yugoslav Partisans) Boro Vukmirović (executed) (Yugoslav Partisans) Fadil Hoxha (Yugoslav Partisans) Josip Broz Tito (Yugoslav Partisans) Mile Čalović (Yugoslav Partisans) Tomica Popović; Enver Hoxha; Hysni Kapo; Hysni Daja; Shefqet Peçi; Ramiz Alia; Gjin Marku; Skënder Libohova †	(Chetniks) Draža Mihailović (executed) (Chetniks) Kosta Pećanac (executed) (Chetniks) Živojin Marković (Tsardom of Bulgaria (1908–1946)) Bogdan Filov (Tsardom of Bulgaria (1908–1946)) Mulla Dulla (1941–1944) (Tsardom of Bulgaria (1908–1946)) Ali Sylë Staneci (1941–1944)

Casualties and losses
- (Democratic Federal Yugoslavia) c. 10,000 Serbs and Montenegrins killed 3,000–12,000 Albanians killed

Kosovo during the Second World War was in a very dramatic period, because different currents clashed, bringing constant tensions within it. During World War II, the region of Kosovo was split into three occupational zones: Italian, German, and Bulgarian. Partisans from Albania and Yugoslavia led the fight for Kosovo's independence from the invader and his allies. During occupation by Axis powers, Bulgarian and Albanian collaborators killed thousands of Kosovo Serbs and Montenegrins. Tens of thousands were also expelled or were placed into concentration camps.

== Overview ==
Yugoslavia was conquered by the Axis in April 1941 and divided mainly between Italy and Germany. Kosovo was included mainly in the Italian controlled area and was united to fascist Albania between 1941 and 1943.

After the Axis invasion of Yugoslavia in 1941, most of Kosovo was assigned to Italian-controlled Albania, with the rest being controlled by Germany and Bulgaria. A three-dimensional conflict ensued, involving inter-ethnic, ideological, and international affiliations.

=== Persecution of Serbs and Montenegrins ===
Mustafa Kruja, the then-Prime Minister of Albania, was in Kosovo in June 1942, and at a meeting with the Albanian leaders of Kosovo, he said: "Efforts should be made to get rid of the Serbian population in Kosovo and Metohija as soon as possible ... All indigenous Serbs should be declared as colonists and, with the help of the governments of Albania and Italy, should be sent to concentration camps in Albania. The Serbian settlers should be killed." It is estimated that approximately 10,000 Serbs and Montenegrins were massacred in Kosovo throughout the war, mainly by Albanian paramilitaries. Between 70,000 and 100,000 Serbs and Montenegrins were deported or sent to concentration camps throughout the war and 72,000 Albanians had settled in Kosovo from Albania. In the Nuremberg trials, it was established that the SS Skanderbeg committed crimes against humanity in Kosovo against ethnic Serbs, Jews, and Roma.

Recorded crimes against Serbs include the massacre of 162 people from April–May 1941 in the districts of Peja, Gjakova, Istog and Drenica, the killings of 150 people from 30 September–10 October 1941 in North Kosovo, the shooting of 65 people from the village of Rakosh in October 1943 and massacre of some 230 Serbs in Peja during late 1943, among many others. These were frequently accompanied by the burning down of villages and expulsions.

=== Fate of Kosovo ===
During the New Year's Eve between 1943 and 1944, Albanian and Yugoslav partisans gathered at the town of Bujan, near Kukës in northern Albania, where they held a conference in which they discussed the fate of Kosovo after the war. Both Albanian and Yugoslav communists signed the agreement, according to which Kosovo would have the right to democratically decide whether it wants to remain in Albania or become part of Serbia. This was seen as the marxist solution for Kosovo. The agreement was not respected by Yugoslavia, since Tito knew that Serbia would not accept it.

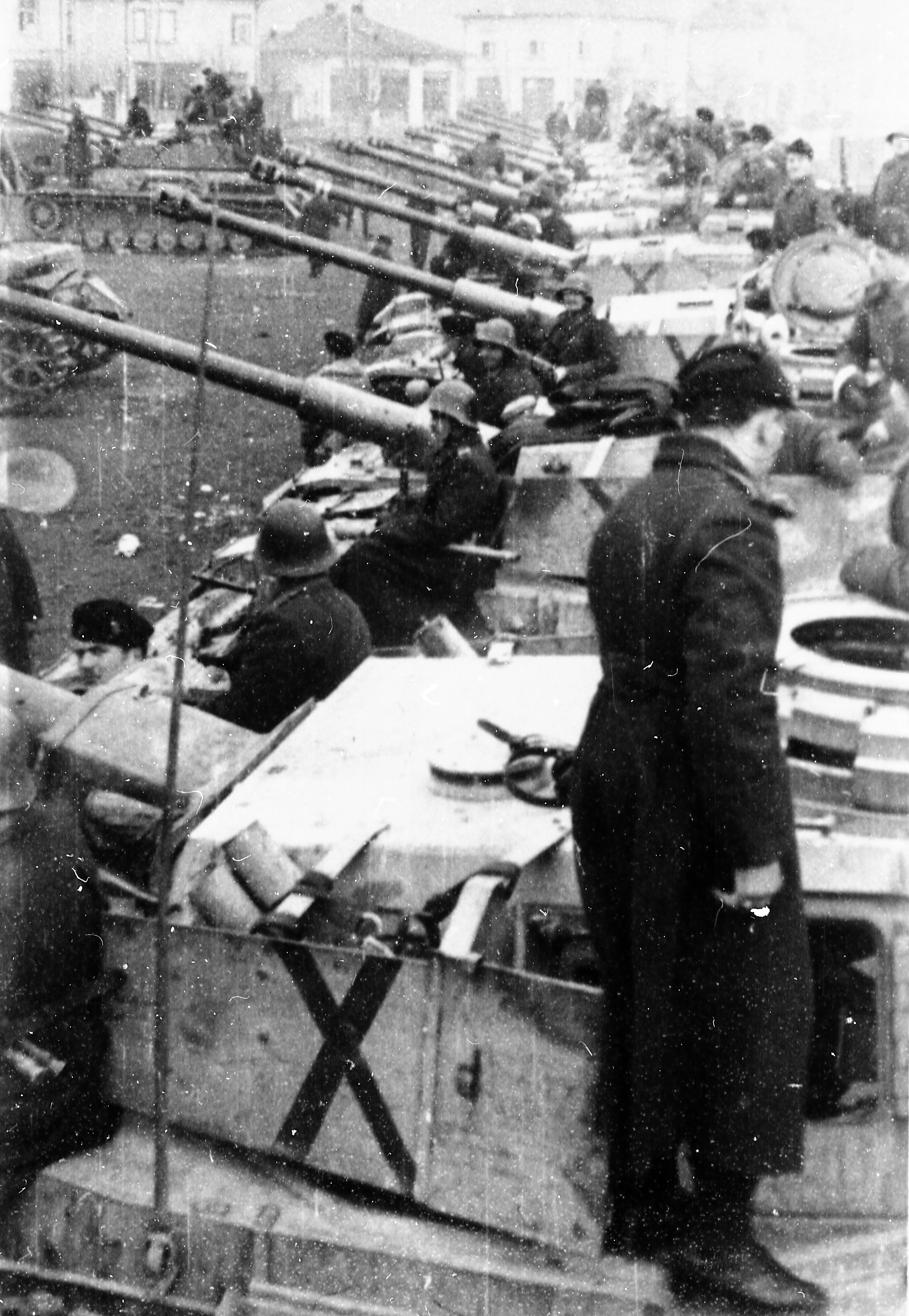
Bulgarian armored brigade in November 1944 in Podujevë, during the Kosovo Operation.

After the surrender of the Kingdom of Italy in September 1943, the German forces took over direct control of the region. In September 1944 the Soviet Union declared war on Bulgaria and occupied part of the country. A coup d'état on 9 September led to Bulgaria joining the Soviets. As result in the early October three Bulgarian armies, consisting of around 340,000-man, together with the Red Army entered occupied Yugoslavia and moved from Sofia to Niš, Skopje and Pristina to blocking the German forces withdrawing from Greece. The Bulgarians operated in conjunction with the Yugoslav and Albanian communist partisans. Kosovo was occupied by the end of November.

== Administration ==
=== Prefectures ===
==== Prefecture of Prishtina ====
The prefecture of Pristina was first occupied by the Germans. With the consent of the supreme circles of Wehrmacht, the German army withdrew from Pristina on April 31, 1941. A day later, this city was occupied by the units of the Italian forces. This prefecture extended in the north to Bardhosh, in the northeast to Prapashtica, and in the west to Çikatovë. From August 1941, Pristina became the seat of this prefecture.

The prefecture of Pristina had two sub-prefectures and 32 municipalities with a territory of 2,310 km^{2} where nearly 178,000 inhabitants lived. Its prefects were Albanians. The first prefect was Iljaz Agushi, then in order, Riza Drini, Miftar Dibra, Tahir Kolgjini and Hysen Prishtina.

==== Prefecture of Prizren ====
The prefecture of Prizren included 4 sub-prefectures with 38 municipalities. The territory of this prefecture covered an area of 3090 km^{2} where 230,000 inhabitants lived. Whereas, according to the High Civil Commissioner for Kosovo, the prefecture had 173,000 inhabitants. Apparently the population changed over time as a result of its movement. Communes were formed in the largest rural residential centers.

The prefecture administered the courts, the economy, education and culture. The Royal Prosecutor's Office, the Court of Inquiry, the Court of First Instance, and others operated in the prefecture of Prizren.

==== Prefecture of Peja ====
On September 22, 1941, the High Civil Commissioner Fejzı Alizoti issued the Decree for the formation of the prefecture of Peja, based in Peja. Until September 22, 1941, Peja was a sub-prefecture. The prefecture of Peja was located in the northern part of Albania, in the northwest of Kosovo and bordered, in the northeast, with the district of Mitrovica, in the east with the prefecture of Pristina, in the southwest with the prefecture of Shkodra. This prefecture had an area of 2,310 km^{2} and around 130,000 inhabitants. According to the High Commissioner for Kosovo, the prefecture of Peja had 167,000 inhabitants. It consisted of 5 sub-prefectures and 26 municipalities.

=== Opening of Albanian schools ===
Prior to the initiation of Kosovo's annexation to Albania was determined and before the instructions from Rome came, under the personal responsibility, the Minister of Education, Prof. Ernest Koliqi sent 200 teachers and professors to the "freed lands" with the clear aim of establishing the foundations of Albanian education. With the direction of this mission, Koliqi entrusted the Gjrokaster intellectual and pedagogue, Ali Hashorva. At that time in Rome, there was talk of "leaving the Slavic language in schools and in the administration for at least 10 years".

With the intervention of Ernest Koliqi, this initial plan of the fascist elite of Rome changed. Koliqi opened and supported Albanian schools in Kosovo, and from these schools emerged the first elite of Kosovar teachers and intellectuals. Vasil Andonin, contrary to the opinion of all the heads of the ministry, was appointed as director of the dormitory in Pristina.

On November 12, 1941, with a special decree of the General Viceroyalty, following the proposal of the Minister of Education, Ernest Koliqi, numerous schools were added to the already existing ones. The decree gave the possibility to students of Albanian nationality from high schools closed to Yugoslavia and who came from abroad, to enroll in high schools of the Kingdom of Albania, which were located within the old borders. The schools were all maintained at state expense. The Ministry of Education, in order to cope with the extraordinary needs for hiring contract teachers, gave the teaching staff salaries of 250 to 300 Albanian francs per month. Dormitories were also built in Pristina and in annexed Tetovo (present-day North Macedonia).

In the school year 1941 - 1942, 173 primary schools, 3 secondary schools and several lower gymnasiums were opened. Later this number reached 264, while in the school year 1943 - 1944 the figure reached 400 schools in the Albanian language. In this school year, over 25,000 Albanian students attended in these schools.

By 1943, in Kosovo and Albanian-controlled parts of Macedonia and Montenegro, 511 Albanian primary schools were opened, consisting of 19,121 students, who were taught by 487 teachers. Koliqi contributed directly to the opening of the Normal School of Prishtina, the Lyceum in Prizren and Tetovo, the Normal School in Gjakova, the Agricultural Technical Institute and the Gymnasium in Peja.

== Aftermath ==
Kosovo became a province of Serbia within the Democratic Federal Yugoslavia. The Kosovo Albanians, who had been promised self-determination if they joined the Partisans, rebelled and martial law was declared. It took about six months for the area to be pacified after some 20,000 Albanians under Shaban Polluzha resisted integration of Kosovo within Yugoslavia. Polluzha was later killed in battle. Between 400 and 2,000 Kosovar Albanian recruits of the Yugoslav Army were shot in Bar.

== See also ==
- Bar massacre
- History of Kosovo
- Kosovo Operation (1944)
- Kosovo during World War I
- 20th-century history of Kosovo
- List of massacres in Kosovo
