= Albanian nationalism in Kosovo =

Kosovo is the birthplace of the Albanian nationalist movement which emerged as a response to the Eastern Crisis of 1878. In the immediate aftermath of the Russo-Ottoman war, the Congress of Berlin proposed partitioning Ottoman Albanian inhabited lands in the Balkans among neighbouring countries. The League of Prizren was formed by Albanians to resist those impositions. For Albanians those events have made Kosovo an important place regarding the emergence of Albanian nationalism. During the remainder of the late Ottoman period various disagreements between Albanian nationalists and the Ottoman Empire over socio-cultural rights culminated in two revolts within Kosovo and adjacent areas. The Balkan Wars (1912–13) ending with Ottoman defeat, Serbian and later Yugoslav sovereignty over the area generated an Albanian nationalism that has become distinct to Kosovo stressing Albanian language, culture, and identity within the context of secession from Serbia. Pan-Albanian sentiments are also present and historically have been achieved only once when part of Kosovo was united by Italian Axis forces to their protectorate of Albania during the Second World War.

Reincorporated within Yugoslavia, Albanian nationalism in Kosovo has drawn upon Kosovar folk culture and traditions which became imbued with theories of descent from ancient Illyrians and Dardanians stressing the purported precedence of Albanian settlement and rights to the area over the Serbs. Traditions of armed resistance by local Albanians to Serbian forces have existed since the interwar period resulting in various and protracted conflicts, ethnic cleansing and violence on both sides. The most recent was the Kosovo War (1999) between the guerilla fighters of the Kosovo Liberation Army (KLA) and Yugoslav army who later were evicted from Kosovo through NATO military intervention. Placed under an international United Nations framework, Kosovar Albanians declared independence (2008) which is internationally recognised by some number of countries satisfying a main tenet of Kosovar Albanian nationalism. Albanian nationalism in Kosovo stresses a secular character sidelining religion.

== History ==
=== Background: Late Ottoman period ===
Just as we are not and do not want to be Turks, so we shall oppose with all our might anyone who would like to turn us into Slavs or Austrians or Greeks, we want to be Albanians.

— Excerpt from the League of Prizren memorandum to the British delegation at the Berlin Congress, 1878,

.

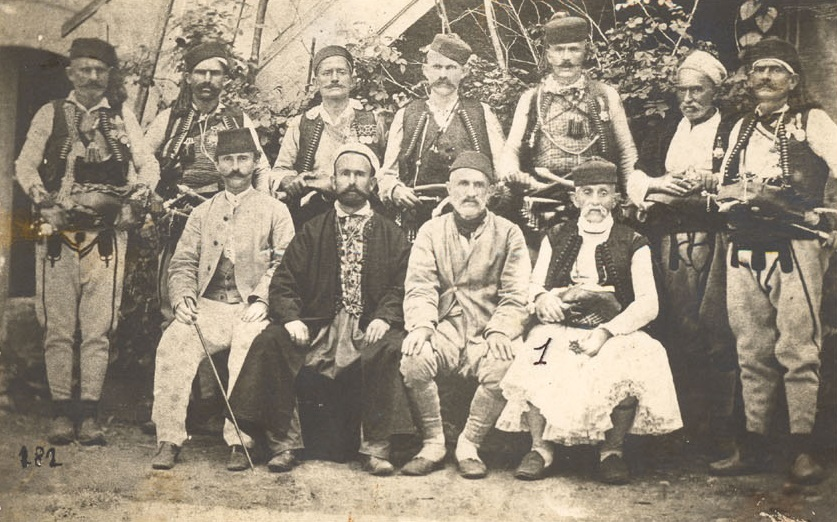
Group photo of some Prizren League delegates (1878)

The Albanian National movement first emerged in Kosovo through the League of Prizren that attempted to prevent Albanian inhabited territories from being awarded to neighbouring states and over time has become a focus of discourses within Albanian nationalism. The geopolitical crisis also generated the beginnings of the Rilindja (Albanian National Awakening) period. With the rise of the Eastern Crisis, Muslim Albanians became torn between loyalties to the Ottoman state and the emerging Albanian nationalist movement. Islam, the Sultan and the Ottoman Empire were traditionally seen as synonymous in belonging to the wider Muslim community. While the Albanian nationalist movement advocated self-determination and strived to achieve socio-political recognition of Albanians as a separate people and language within the state. Albanian nationalism was a movement that began among Albanian intellectuals without popular demand from the wider Albanian population. Geopolitical events pushed Albanian nationalists, many Muslim, to distance themselves from the Ottomans, Islam and the then emerging pan-Islamic Ottomanism of Sultan Abdulhamid II.

During the Russo-Turkish war, the incoming Serb army expelled most of the Muslim Albanian population from the Toplica and Niš regions into Kosovo triggering the emergence of the League of Prizren (1878–1881). Formed as a response to the Eastern crisis and possible partition, the Prizren League was created by a group of Albanian intellectuals to resist neighbouring foreign Balkan states and to assert an Albanian national consciousness by uniting Albanians into a unitary linguistic and cultural nation. Leaders of the Prizren league opposed both Pan-Slavism of southern Slavic peoples and the Greek Megali Idea. The Prizren league opposed territory containing Albanian speakers being awarded to Greece, Serbia and Montenegro with the Ottoman state for a while supporting the league's claims as it saw Albanian nationalism possibly preventing further territorial losses to newly independent Balkan states. During the late Ottoman period, ethno-national Albanian identity as expressed in contemporary times did not exist amongst the wider Kosovo Albanian-speaking population. Instead collective identities were based upon either socio-professional, socio-economic, regional, or religious identities and sometimes relations between Muslim and Christian Albanians were tense. Some people coming from a Balkan Albanian speaking or cultural space and often belonging to the urban elite in Kosovo that migrated to Anatolia did not always identify with a concept of Albanianess. Instead they adopted an Ottoman Turkish outlook and came to refer to themselves as Turks or Ottoman Turkish speaking citizens. Due to the effects of socio-linguistic assimilation, promoters of Albanian nationalism became concerned about migration to Anatolia and degraded Albanians from the lower classes who undertook the journey.

In 1908 a conference of delegates decided on an Albanian Latin alphabet and the Ottoman government expressed its displeasure alongside other Young Turk policies resulting in a breakdown of relations between Albanian elites and nationalists, many Muslim with Ottoman authorities. The Ottoman Young Turk government was concerned that Albanian nationalism might inspire other Muslim nationalities toward such initiatives and threaten the Muslim-based unity of the empire. The demands for political, cultural and linguistic rights eventually made the Ottomans adopt measures to repress Albanian nationalism which resulted in two Albanian revolts toward the end of Ottoman rule. The first revolt during 1910 in Kosovo and northern Albania was a reaction toward the new Ottoman government policy of centralization. The other revolt in the same areas was in 1912 that sought Albanian political and linguistic self-determination under the bounds of the Ottoman Empire and with both revolts many of the leaders and fighters were Muslim and Catholic Albanians. These Albanian revolts were also a turning point that impacted the Young Turk government which increasingly moved from a policy direction of pan-Ottomanism and Islam toward a singular national Turkish outlook. Ottoman opposition to Albanian-language education and grassroots efforts by Albanian nationalists influenced some Albanian Muslim clergy in Kosovo to embrace the cause of Albanian education during the late Ottoman period. Some Muslim clergy got involved in Albanian cultural clubs and others promoted teaching of Albanian in religious schools and made appeals to others in Kosovar Albanian society to do so. With a de-emphasis of Islam, the Albanian nationalist movement gained the strong support of two Adriatic Sea powers Austria-Hungary and Italy who were concerned about pan-Slavism in the wider Balkans and Anglo-French hegemony purportedly represented through Greece in the area.

=== Balkan Wars, World War One and interwar period ===
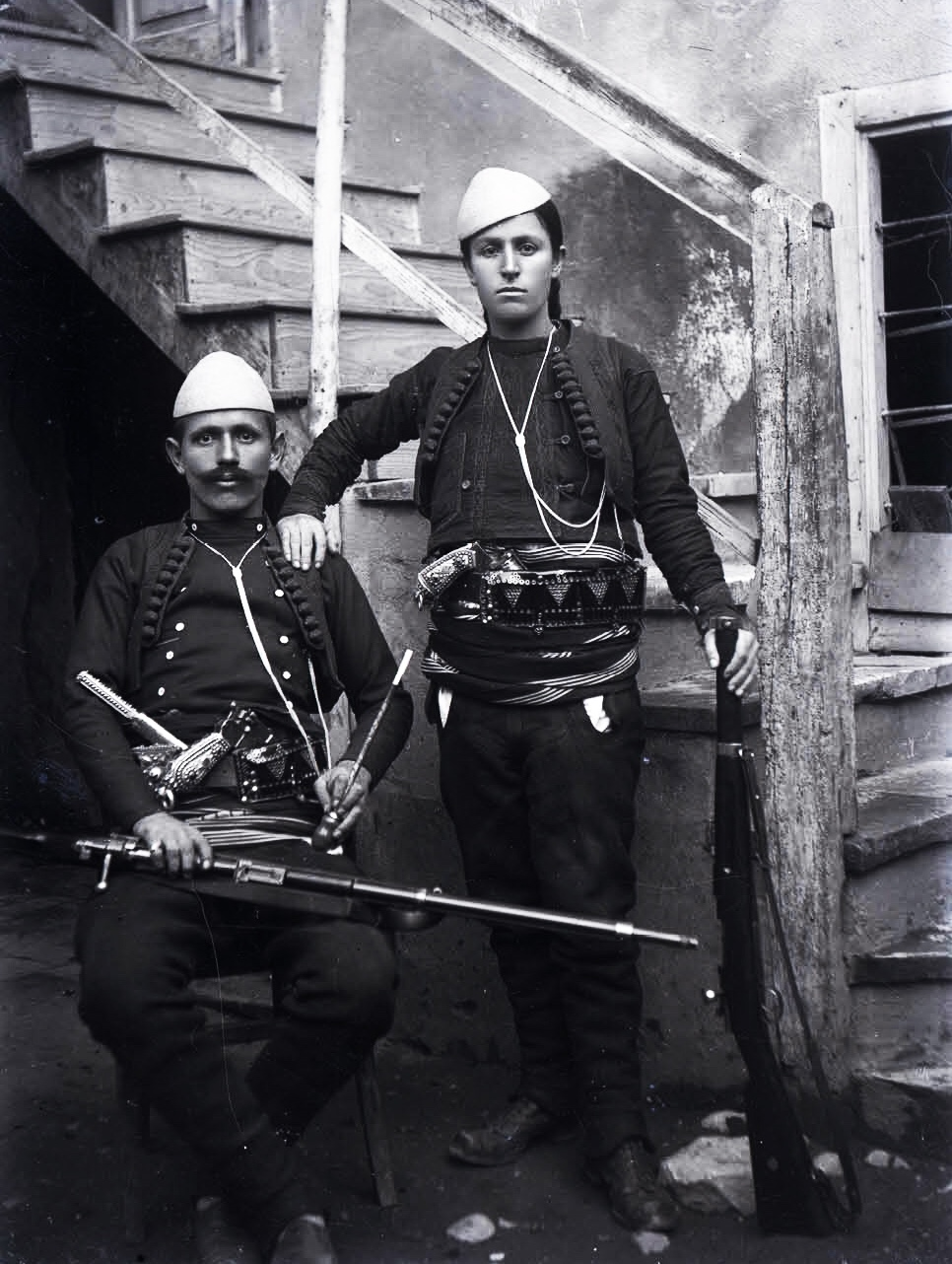
Azem Galica and Shota Galica, leaders of the Kaçak movement (1920)

Kosovar Albanian nationalism has been defined through its clash with Serbian nationalism where both view Kosovo as the birthplace of their cultural and national identities. Ottoman rule ended in 1912 during the Balkan Wars and Kosovo became part of Serbia. During this time Serb forces in Kosovo engaged in killings and forced migration of Albanians while the national building aims of the Serbian state were to assimilate some and remove most Albanians by replacing them with Serbian settlers. The Serb state believed that Albanians had no sense of nationhood while Albanian nationalism was viewed as the result of Austro-Hungarian and Italian intrigue. These events fostered feelings of Albanian victimisation and defeatism, grudges against the Serbs and Great Powers who had agreed to that state of affairs which ran alongside Albanian nationalism. Kosovar Albanian nationalism drew upon and became embedded in popular culture such as village customs within a corpus of rich historical myths, distinctive folk music referring to harvests along with marriage and clan based law.

During the First World War occupation by Austro-Hungarian forces, Albanian schools were opened that later were shut down during the interwar years by Yugoslav authorities while religious Islamic education was only permissible in Turkish. Serbian language education based upon a curriculum of common Slavic identity was instituted by authorities as a medium to integrate Albanians into the state, while they viewed Yugoslav education policy as denationalisation. Yugoslav education policy repressed Albanian secular education to undermine sentiments of Albanian national identity and culture with a view to preventing possible nationalist challenges to Yugoslavia. Religious private Muslim schools were condoned by authorities and seen as promoting collective identity based on religion among Albanians. During the 1920s education taught by Albanian Muslim clergy moved to Muslim tekkes, maktabs and madrasas which emerged as underground centres for spreading and generating Albanian nationalism strengthening within Albanian nationhood the religious element. Albanian nationalists were against this development as their efforts were toward building Albanian national identity on secular grounds. Religious Muslim schools by the 1930s became viewed as a threat to the state and Yugoslav authorities replaced Albanian Muslim clergy with pro-Serbian Slavic Muslim clergy and teachers from Bosnia to prevent Albanian nationalist activities developing in religious institutions. Albanians opposed those moves and boycotted imposed teachers. Albanian was prohibited by the Yugoslav authorities and some Albanians were made to emigrate.

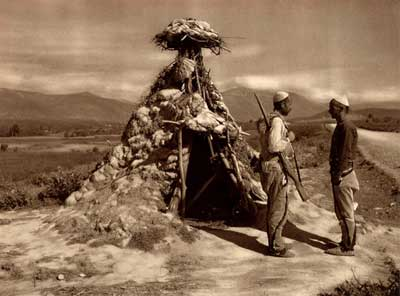
Kosovo Albanian rebels controlling a road in Kosovo, (1920s)

Secessionist sentiments after the First World War became expressed through the Kaçak movement led by the Kosovo Committee made up of Kosovar Albanian exiles opposed to Yugoslav rule. Represented on the ground as a guerilla group the Kaçak movement was led by Azem Galica and later his wife Shota Galica that fought a small scale war (1918–1921) in formations of çetas or fighting bands against the Yugoslav army. Supported by Italy who gave financial aid and Albania, the Kaçak movement was eventually suppressed by the Serbs during the late 1920s. The movement contributed to the development of an Albanian national consciousness in Kosovo and Macedonia. Yugoslav authorities in the 1930s replaced Albanian imams with ones that were hostile to Sufism from Bosnia weakening Albanian nationalism. Kosovar Albanians were viewed by Yugoslav authorities as an enemy within that could challenge the territorial integrity of the state. Albanians in Kosovo felt that Serbian and later Yugoslav rule constituted a foreign conquest. Confiscations of Albanian land and settlement of Serbian colonists throughout the interwar period drove Kosovar Albanians during the Second World War to collaborate with the Axis powers who promised a Greater Albania.

=== World War Two ===
The Italian annexation of Kosovo to Albania was considered a popular action by Albanians of both areas and initially Kosovar Albanians supported Axis Italian forces. Collapse of Yugoslav rule resulted in actions of revenge being undertaken by Albanians, some joining the local Vulnetari militia that burned Serbian settlements and killed Serbs while interwar Serbian and Montenegrin colonists were expelled into Serbia proper. The aim of these actions were to create a homogeneous Greater Albanian state. Italian authorities in Kosovo allowed the use of Albanian in schools, university education and administration. In Kosovo and other newly attached territories to Albania, non-Albanians had to attend Albanian schools that taught a curricula containing nationalism alongside fascism and were made to adopt Albanian forms for their names and surnames. In 1943, Italian control became replaced with German rule and the fiction of an independent Albania was maintained. In 1944 Axis German forces created the SS Skanderbeg division to serve only in Kosovo and named it after the 15th century Albanian commander who fought the Ottomans. Kosovar Albanians were its main recruits and though mass desertions occurred, its members participated in operations against Serbian areas resulting in civilian deaths and pillage while the small Jewish community of Kosovo was arrested and deported. An attempt to get Kosovar Albanians to join the resistance, a meeting in Bujan (1943–1944), northern Albania was convened between Balli Kombëtar members and Albanian communists that agreed to common struggle and maintenance of the newly expanded boundaries. The deal was opposed by Yugoslav partisans and later rescinded resulting in limited Kosovar Albanian recruits. Some Balli Kombëtar members such as Shaban Polluzha became partisans with the view that Kosovo would become part of Albania. With the end of the war, some of those Kosovar Albanians felt betrayed by the return of Yugoslav rule and for several years Albanian nationalists in Kosovo resisted both the partisans and later the new Yugoslav army. Albanian nationalists viewed their inclusion within Yugoslavia as an occupation.

=== Discrimination: the 1950s and 1960s ===
Flag of Albanian minority in SFR Yugoslavia

During the interwar period and after the Second World War Kosovar Albanian society lacking Albanian-language education such as those residing in villages were mainly illiterate and folk music was the main driver of nationalism. Most Albanian people in the region, aware of differences with Kosovo Serbs and an emerging Macedonian nationality embraced Albanian national identity. Few Albanians claimed a Turkish identity as old Ottoman Millet style classifications based on religious identification waned. The role of Islam locally transformed from a faith community previously unifying Albanians with other Muslim coreligionists in the region and Middle East into one of an ethnic identity marker for Kosovar Albanians separating them from Orthodox Slavs. These changes placed pressure on other Muslim minorities living in Albanian areas to assimilate as Albanians. The 1950s and 1960s were a period marked by repression and anti Albanian policies in Kosovo under Aleksandar Ranković, a Serbian communist who later fell out and was dismissed by Tito. During this time nationalism for Kosovar Albanians became a conduit to alleviate the conditions of the time. In 1968 Yugoslav Serb officials warned about rising Albanian nationalism and by November unrest and demonstrations by thousands of Albanians followed calling for Kosovo to attain republic status, an independent Albanian-language university and some for unification with Albania. Tito rewrote the Yugoslav constitution (1974) and attempted to address Albanian grievances by awarding the province of Kosovo autonomy and powers such as a veto in the federal decision-making process similar to that of the republics. Kosovo functioned as a de facto republic as Kosovar Albanians attained the ability to pursue near independent foreign relations, trade and cultural links with Albania, an independent Albanian-language university and Albanian studies institute, an Academy of Sciences and Writers association with the ability to fly the Albanian flag.

=== Cultural revival: 1970s and 1980s ===
Between 1971 and 1981, the rise of Albanian nationalism in Kosovo coincided with a revival of Albanian culture that opened new avenues of national expression and awareness that came about when Yugoslavia conceded some cultural and political rights to Kosovar Albanians. Tito's efforts at emphasising a distinctive Yugoslav identity by integrating various nationalities into the sociopolitical Yugoslav structure by overcoming various cultural traditions concerned nationalists who feared assimilation. Regarded mainly as radical movements and on the political fringe, efforts were devoted by nationalists in the diaspora to keep Albanian national symbols and culture alive while other more militant Kosovar Albanian nationalists wanted a Greater Albania. Some Albanian individuals who went abroad embedded themselves among Yugoslav Albanian diasporas formed in the US and in Western European countries. They acted as tutors while also generating print media that aided in educating that diaspora population and hence providing them with the means to participate in events taking place in the Balkans. The issue of Albanian nationalism in Yugoslavia during this time was left mainly for Kosovar Albanian communists to deal with and they withheld intelligence about activities on some underground organisations from Belgrade.

Albanian nationalism in Kosovo is based on the idea of historic rights that Albanians are descendants of ancient Illyrians making them the first population entitled to Kosovo and predating the arrival of Slavs, the ancestors of the Serbs. Scholarship by (patriotic) Kosovar Albanian historians (1970s-onward) revolved around researching and attempting to demonstrate Illyrian-Albanian continuity alongside the precedence of that population in Kosovo and Macedonia over Serbs and Macedonians. Kosovar Albanian historians also focused on the Second World War partisan struggle and the Albanian contribution to the liberation of Yugoslavia as being proportionate to other nationalities. These arguments were used to justify Albanian claims toward a right to Kosovo and for the Albanian desire to elevate Kosovo as a seventh republic of the Yugoslav federation. Education in Albanian became a source of Albanian nationalism and was confined to Albanian-language texts being inaccessible to non-Albanians while school text books were to some extent nationalistic. Albanian historiography in Albanian-language texts were viewed by critics in Yugoslavia as a root cause of the "indoctrination of the youth" in nationalism.

In 1981 there was an outburst of Albanian nationalism. Prishtina university became a centre for some nationalistically orientated students that generated Kosovar Albanian protests (1981) over social grievances that marked the first large scale expression of nationalism in Yugoslavia since the Croatian Spring (1971). Kosovar Albanian communists condemned the protests and supported Yugoslav unity while leading the campaign against Albanian nationalism and in that sense shared the view of other Yugoslav communists. The Islamic Community of Yugoslavia dominated by Slavic Muslims distanced itself from the protests, expressed anti-Albanian sentiments and condemned Albanian irredentism estranging Albanian Muslims from establishment Sunni Islam. Albanian Sufi sheikhs instead promoted Sufism among Yugoslav Albanians as an alternative, more traditional and decentralised form of Albanian Islam. The unification of Albanians in the Balkans into one state was also a feature of Kosovar Albanian nationalism and these views were confined to dissident and underground groups. Within the context of the 1981 protests these groups, many with left-wing political orientations united to form the People's Movement of Kosovo (LPRK) in Germany (1982). Unification of Albanians into one state was a demand viewed as separatism and irredentism in Yugoslavia which was banned. Kosovar Albanian nationalists were divided into groups with one that wanted to focus on the Albanian question as a whole and the other mainly focusing on Kosovo.

=== Dissidence and rise of nationalism ===
Influences from abroad came and some nationalists were assisted by Hoxha's intelligence services toward supporting the goal of an independent Kosovo. Political dissent by Kosovar Albanians followed resulting in imprisonment and comprising the majority of political prisoners during the 1970s and 1980s. The Yugoslav government claimed that it uncovered during these years many underground Kosovar Albanian separatist organisations. Imprisoned Albanians were subjected to torture and they were viewed by Kosovar Albanians as martyrs which led to those involved in political activities to operate within a decentralised organisational structure of small cells. Prominent Albanian prisoners such as dissident Adem Demaçi became an inspirational figure for new generations of Albanian nationalists. The trials and imprisonment of Albanians deemed irredentists by Yugoslav authorities increasingly antagonised and radicalised sections of the wider Kosovar Albanian population. The high birthrate in Kosovo was viewed by Albanians as a way of achieving a pure Kosovo by outnumbering local Serbs while communist politicians held the view that Albanian irredentists were attempting to rid Kosovo of Serbs. Some Yugoslav orientated Kosovar Albanians, mainly Catholics lacking certain nationalist sentiments held concerns for their safety due to fears that alleged once Muslim Albanians dealt with Orthodox Christians they would be targeted next. Some Catholic Albanians were in favour of curtailing Muslim dominance on the Albanian scene in a manner done by authorities in Montenegro.

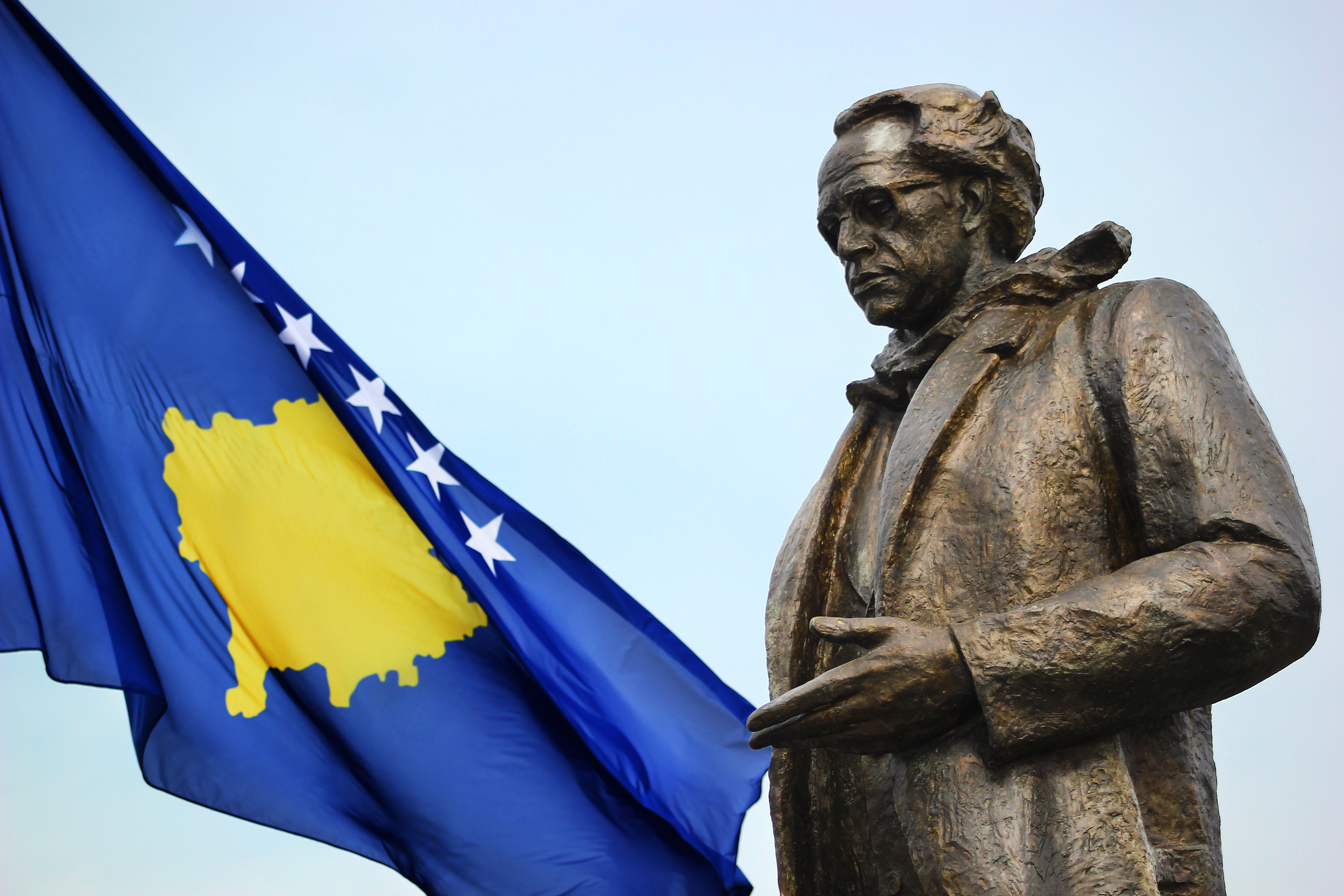
Statue of Ibrahim Rugova, Prishtina

Repression of Albanian nationalism and Albanian nationalists by authorities in Belgrade strengthened the independence movement and focused international attention toward the plight of Kosovar Albanians. The recentralisation of Yugoslavia was promoted due to events in Kosovo, while Serbian nationalism within cultural institutions and the media gained strength. Expressions of Albanian national identity were perceived as overwhelmingly anti-Yugoslav and increasingly anti-Serb. Within that context Albanian-language education was viewed as threatening Serbian borders and sovereignty. Kosovar Albanian education was identified with Albanian nationalism while everyone involved was labelled and affected with ideological discrimination eventuating into national confrontation and later intervention. By 1989 the degree of autonomy that Kosovo had attained within Yugoslavia was rescinded by Serbian leader Slobodan Milosević. The Milosević regime also repressed political dissent and initiated discrimination of Kosovar Albanians with the aim of protecting Kosovar Serbs. Albanian nationalists created a non-governmental organisation called the Democratic League of Kosovo (LDK) that also gained many dissatisfied Kosovar Albanian communists who joined its ranks after autonomy was rescinded. It was led by the intellectual Ibrahim Rugova who began a period of pacifist resistance and the league created a parallel form of government and civil society while maintaining as its goal to achieve an independent Kosovo. The Kosovo education system became the place where Serbian and Albanian nationalisms played out their conflict. Serbs asserted control of the education system, while educational opportunities for Albanians became limited as they were excluded from university and schools. This prompted Kosovar Albanians to establish a parallel education system where private homes served as schools. Albanian students became immersed in nationalist culture by learning an Albanian history of Kosovo and were no longer exposed to Yugoslav "Brotherhood and Unity" era principles and to learning the Serbian language.

=== Late 1980s and early 1990s ===
Logo of the KLA

Kosovar Albanian national identity making unique claims to Kosovo became homogenised during the 1990s and included multiple factors that led to those developments. Of those were Albanian civil disobedience and popular resistance, the creation of a parallel society in opposition to the Serb state and some underground cells initiating conflict which in all was a reaction to Serbian government policies and repression. From the late 1980s onward Islam within the scope of Albanian identity was downplayed by many Kosovar Albanian intellectual and political figures while Christianity was promoted as a Western marker of "European identity". Albanians in Kosovo alongside their Albanian counterparts in Macedonia after the fall of communism became the main force steering Albanian nationalism, while Islam did not become a main focal point in articulating Albanian political nationalism. Islam was not a significant factor in the recent political mobilization of Kosovar Albanian Muslims who joined with Catholic Albanians during their struggle against the Serbs. During these years Rugova as elected president by Albanians promoted an Albanian identity that stressed their Europeanness and antiquity, in particular one based on ancient Dardania. The wider LDK movement used the resistance theme that had been generated in folklore and traditional songs and turned the image of "victim" into one of "unbreakable hero" invoking traditions of resistance for statehood and toward foreign occupiers. With the Kosovo issue sidelined at the Dayton Peace Accords (1995) ending the dissolution of Yugoslavia, more militant and younger voices disillusioned with Rugova's pacifism dominated like the Kosovo Liberation Army (founded 1992) that began attacks against Serbian forces. The KLA had emerged from the LPRK as many of its members belonged to the political movement. As its founding goal was to unite Albanian inhabited lands in the Balkans into a Greater Albania, the ideological underpinnings of the KLA were overwhelmingly that of Albanian nationalism stressing Albanian culture, ethnicity and nation. Milosević portrayed himself as the force to curb Albanian nationalism and Greater Albania with the appeal to others such as Greece of acting in that capacity.

=== Kosovo conflict (1990s) and Kosovan independence (2000s) ===
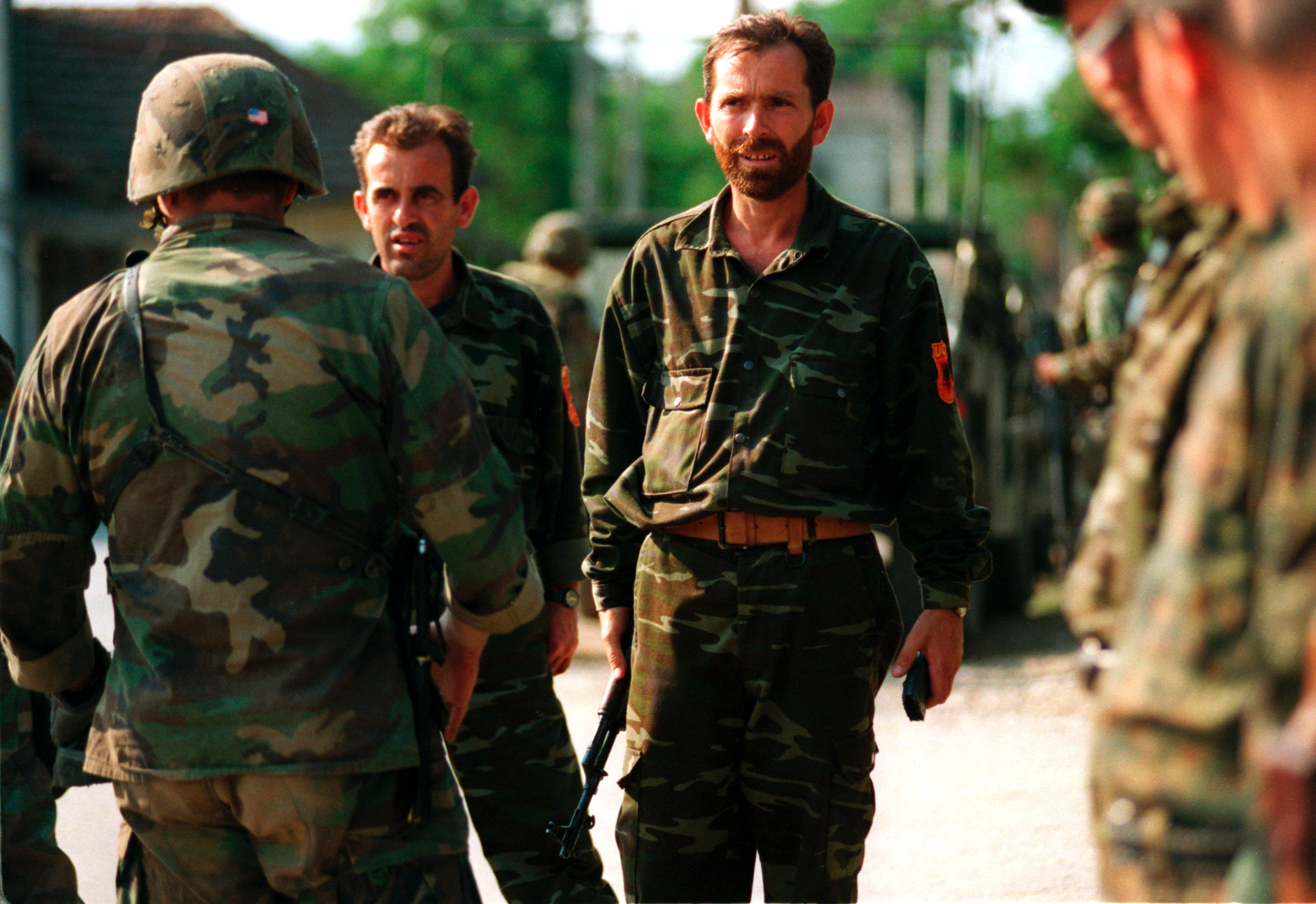
Two Kosovo Liberation Army members (background) with US marine (foreground), 1999

Conflict escalated from 1997 onward due to the Yugoslavian army retaliating with a crackdown in the region resulting in violence and population displacements. Myths of first settlement and Illyrian descent served to justify for Kosovar Albanians the independence struggle seen as one to eventually unite Albanian lands into a unitary state recreating the mythical state of Illyicum encompassing contemporary Balkan Albanian inhabited lands. A shootout at the Jashari family compound involving Adem Jashari, a KLA commander and surrounding Yugoslav troops in 1998 resulted in the massacre of most Jashari family members. The event became a rallying myth for KLA recruitment regarding armed resistance to Yugoslav forces. By 1999 international interest in Kosovo eventuated into war resulting in NATO intervention against Milosević, ethnic cleansing of thousands of Albanians driving them into neighbouring countries with the cessation of conflict marking the withdrawal of Yugoslav forces. Many people from non-Albanian communities such as the Serbs and Romani fled Kosovo fearing revenge attacks by armed people and returning refugees while others were pressured by the KLA and armed gangs to leave. Post conflict Kosovo was placed under an international United Nations framework with the UN Interim Administration Mission in Kosovo (UNMIK) overseeing administrative affairs and the UN Kosovo Force (KFOR) dealing with defence.

Official flag of the Kosovar President designed by Ibrahim Rugova.

In post conflict Kosovo Rugova as first president in his drive toward emphasizing aspects of statehood spent time researching and pursued an identity management project that centred on ancient Dardania and designed state symbols for a future independent Kosovo. Notable among those are the Kosovan presidential flag that displays the two headed eagle of Skanderbeg with the word Dardania emblazoned on it. Some Kosovar Albanians have referred to Kosovo as Dardania and Rugova at times supported those moves. To define Kosovo as an Albanian area, a toponyms commission (1999) led by Kosovar Albanian academics was established to determine new or alternative names for some settlements, streets, squares and organisations with Slavic origins that underwent a process of Albanisation during this period. Those measures have been promoted by sectors of the Kosovar Albanian academic, political, literary and media elite that caused administrative and societal confusion with multiple toponyms being used resulting in sporadic acceptance by wider Kosovar Albanian society.

In 2004, prolonged negotiations over Kosovo's future status, sociopolitical problems and nationalist sentiments resulted in the Kosovo riots. Organised and spontaneous acts of violence and damage by Kosovar Albanians was directed at properties of the Serbs, their churches and the Romani leaving some dead and many displaced. International legal precedents based on territorial sovereignty overriding self-determination were brushed aside in the case of Kosovo when parts of the international community recognised the declaration of Kosovar independence (2008). This was put down to fears that not doing so would result in Albanian nationalism possibly making the situation difficult and worse for the international community in Kosovo had conflict eventuated. Albanian nationalism is viewed in the Balkans as having furthered events in Kosovo which has caused concerns about the phenomenon of nationalism and generated fears among Serbs, Croats, Macedonians, Romanians and Bulgarians. The ending of the Kosovo war resulted in the emergence of offshoot guerilla groups and political organisations from the KLA continuing various violent struggles. In the Preševo valley the Liberation Army of Preševo, Medveđa and Bujanovac (UÇPMB) fought Yugoslav forces (1999–2001) attempting to unite the area with neighbouring Kosovo with conflict ending in peace talks and greater Albanian rights in Serbia. In northern parts of the Republic of Macedonia the National Liberation Army (NLA) fought against Macedonian forces (2001) with conflict ending in peace talks and the signing of the Ohrid Agreement granting greater Albanian rights in Macedonia.

==== Kosovo War and influence on Albanian diaspora ====
The Kosovo war (1999) generated enthusiasm for using the internet among the Balkan Albanians and the Albanian diaspora (Europe and North America) to meet demands for information and to increase communication between Albanian communities separated by borders and geography. As a consequence the internet has also become a powerful tool for Albanian irredentists to promote political goals against the forces of strong and at times violent state forces seeking to maintain the status quo. Albanian elites who utilised the internet have in cyberspace created a prominent pan-Albanian movement within a single ethno-political space. This has had implications for Albanian national identity in becoming reified and harmonised on the internet. These Albanian websites are often created by diaspora Albanians, in particular from the former Yugoslavia that refer to redeeming irredenta and have maps promoting "Greater Albania" (covering parts of Montenegro, Western Macedonia, Kosovo and Greece). Those discourses and polemics on the internet have affected the international community who is fearful about allowing border changes as it would encourage in Southeastern Europe other irredentisms, ethnic cleansings and wars.

=== Contemporary Kosovar Albanian nationalism (2010s–present) ===
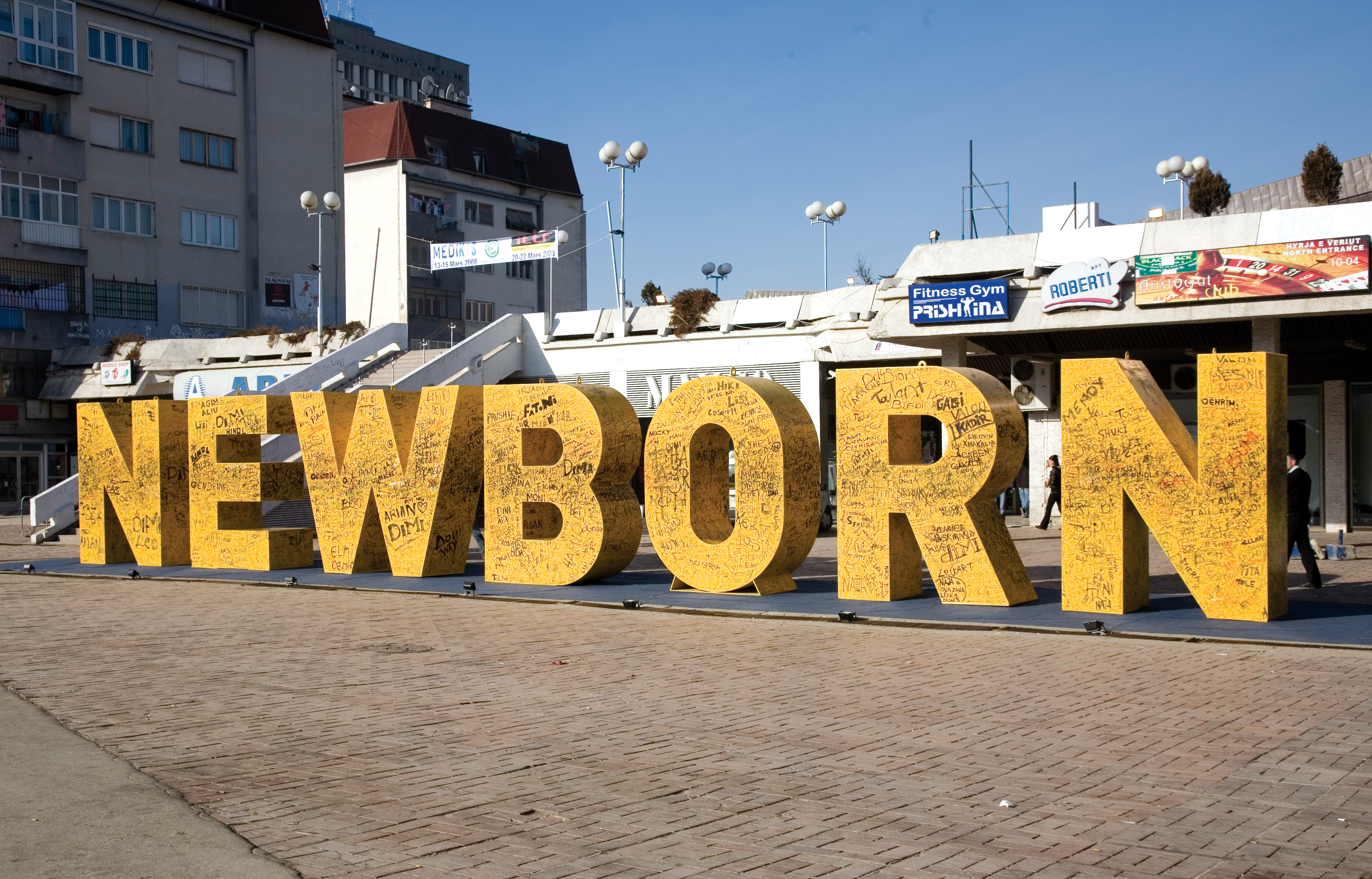
Newborn monument located in Prishtina

In Kosovo, as well as in Albania, Albanians view themselves as being the oldest nation in the Balkans and descendants of the ancient Illyrians with their self-determination struggle being interpreted as one of first settlers in the area fighting against the Slavic Serb "interlopers". Serbs are regarded by Albanian nationalists in generalised terms as "Slavs" and view them without historic territorial rights within an expanded Albanian state. In Kosovo, the additional Dardanian-Illyrian claim also exists that claims contemporary Kosovar Albanians as direct descendants of Dardanians, a subgroup of the Illyrian people who inhabited the area in antiquity. The Dardanians are viewed by Kosovar Albanians as having been Catholics and interpreted as making Albanians historically part of Western civilisation in opposition to the Slavs who are alleged to have taken Catholic churches and converted them into Orthodox ones. The claim has impacted the struggle for Kosovan self-determination from the Serbs in that an independent Kosovo is viewed separate from Albania and as a recovery and recreation of the ancient Dardanian kingdom. Albanian unification has however been interpreted by Kosovar Albanians in the context of reuniting ancient Dardanians into a larger Illyrian whole or modern Albanians of Kosovo into a Greater Albania. The claim has also served to justify expulsion and dispossession of the perceived enemy understood as either temporary or hostile occupiers. A strong link exists in Kosovo for Albanians between nationalist politics and archeology. Kosovar Albanian archeologists continue to attempt through archeological excavations and their interpretations to connect Kosovar Albanians with the local ancient Dardanian and Illyrian populations.

In post conflict Kosovo KLA fighters have been venerated by Kosovar Albanian society with the publishing of literature such as biographies, the erection of monuments and sponsoring of commemorative events. The exploits of Adem Jashari have been celebrated and turned into legend by former KLA members, some in government, and by Kosovar Albanian society resulting in songs, literature, monuments, memorials with streets and buildings bearing his name across Kosovo. The figure of Saint Mother Teresa, whose parents originated from Kosovo has been used for nationalist purposes in Kosovo. Celebrated by Kosovar Catholic Albanians, the Kosovo government and local branch of the Catholic church has promoted Mother Teresa as an Albanian symbol of patriotism. Kosovar Albanians acknowledge her charitable works though some hold misgivings about her patriotism being exaggerated and consideration of her as an Albanian patriot. In the context of de-emphasizing Islam, Kosovar Albanians have shown interest in and referred to Albanian Christian origins and heritage, in particular the Laramans (Kosovar crypto-Catholics) assisted to present Albanians as European despite being Muslim. Old Albanian traditions within the Drenica region hailing as a local the medieval Serb figure Miloš Obilić (Albanian: Millosh Kopiliq) who killed Sultan Murad I have been utilised within Kosovo school textbooks and by some Albanian nationalists to claim the knight as an Albanian. Establishing the participation of Albanians at the Battle of Kosovo has been a means for Kosovar Albanians to claim roots of being European and to sideline the historic conversion to Islam. Within the context of the Kosovo battle and nation building, some in government circles and wider Kosovo Albanian society have promoted a narrative of continuous Albanian resistance from medieval until contemporary times to states and peoples considered foreign occupiers.

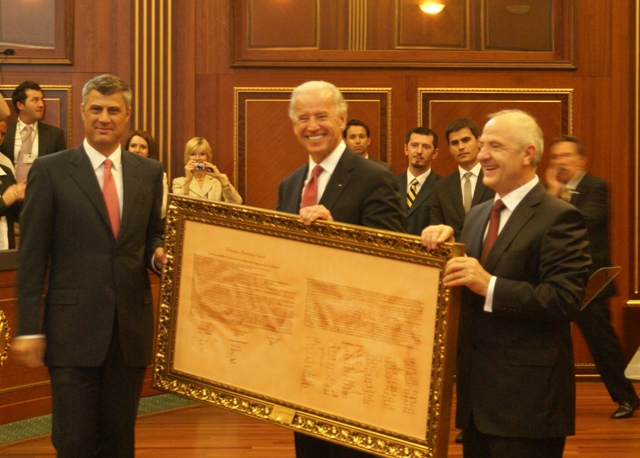
Primeminster Hashim Thaçi (left), U.S. Vice President Joe Biden (centre) and President Fatmir Sejdiu (right) with Kosovo Declaration of Independence, 2009

With the declaration of independence (2008), the Kosovo government has promoted the country both internally and internationally as Newborn generating an ideology that attempts to break with the past and establish a democratic multicultural future. A prominent left wing nationalist movement turned political party Vetëvendosje (Self Determination) has emerged who advocates for closer Kosovo-Albania relations and pan-Albanian self-determination in the Balkans. Another smaller nationalist party, the Balli Kombetar Kosovë (BKK) sees itself as an heir to the original Second World War organization that supports Kosovan independence and pan-Albanian unification. Separate to the political scene there also exists paramilitary formations that aim to create a Greater Albania. Regarded internationally as terrorist during the 2000s the emergence of the militant group the Albanian National Army (AKSh) made up of some disaffected KLA and NLA members operated in Kosovo, Macedonia and Serbia that committed violent acts in those countries.

Albanian nationalism in Kosovo is secular while Islam is mainly subsumed within the parameters of national and cultural identity that entails at times dominant clan and familial identities. Within the public sphere Islam at times resurfaces to challenge the dominant nationalistic view of Albanians being superficial Muslims however the political sphere remains mainly secular. The ambiguity of Islam, its place and role among Balkan (Muslim) Albanians, especially in Albania and Kosovo has limited the ability of it becoming a major component to advance the cause of Great Albania. Greater Albania remains mainly in the sphere of political rhetoric and overall Balkan Albanians view EU integration as the solution to combat crime, weak governance, civil society and bringing different Albanian populations together. In the 2000s onward polling, before Kosovo declared independence, data on Kosovo-Albania unification has waned among Kosovars with support for an independent Kosovo being overwhelming (90.2%). Post independence, support continued to remain high as Kosovo citizens adapted to their statehood, indicating that alongside their Albanian identity a new Kosovar identity has emerged. This factor has been strongly disliked by Albanian nationalists.

However, Albanian nationalism remains popular, with Kosovar Albanians at present supporting the "two states, one nation" platform. This ensures a sustainable Kosovo state, outside of Serbian and foreign control, and a united internal and external front between Kosovo and Albania. Recently, Kosovo's and Albania's governments have signed numerous treaties and memorandums of cooperation which synchronize their policies at home and abroad, including in the diaspora, to create a Pan-Albanian approach without the need for ground unification. The rise of Vetevendosje in Kosovo has further cemented Albanian nationalism and pride within the country, as has a lack of EU integration which has pushed Kosovars to supporting a direct Kosovo-Albania unification to combat isolation, such as with visa liberalization. Gallup surveys between 2008 and 2013 showed 73% of Kosovo Albanians wanted a union with Albania, with independence support being at high over being a part of Serbia. In 2009, one year after Kosovo declared independence, support for Kosovo-Albania unification increased to 77%. Today, Kosovo Albanians see Kosovo as the second Albanian state and unification thus being achieved, yet Albanian loyalty remains higher than loyalty to the new Kosovar/Kosovan state (primarily symbols), as seen with support for the use of the Flag of Albania.
