= Bar massacre =

1945 massacre in Yugoslavia

Coordinates: 42.1°N 19.1°E

- Part of World War II in Yugoslavia
- Location: Bar, Montenegro
- Date: 20 March-30 April 1945
- Target: Kosovo Albanians
- Attack type: Massacre
- Deaths: about 400 to 2995
- Perpetrator: Yugoslav Partisans
- Motive: Retaliation against conscientious objection

The Bar massacre (Albanian: Masakra e Tivarit) was a mass killings of ethnic Albanians from the Serbian province of Kosovo by Yugoslav Partisans in late March or early April 1945 in Bar, a municipality in Montenegro, at the end of World War II.

== Background ==
After the Axis invasion of Yugoslavia in 1941, most of Kosovo region was assigned to Italian-controlled Albania, with the rest being controlled by Germany and Bulgaria. A three-dimensional conflict ensued, involving inter-ethnic, ideological, and international affiliations. Kosovar Albanians collaborated with the Axis powers who promised them a Greater Albania. This was seen as a better alternative to the repressive measures instilled by Serbian politicians during the interwar period, that included the expulsion of Albanians and settlements of mostly Serb colonists in the region. It is estimated that approximately 10,000 Serbs and Montenegrins were killed in Kosovo throughout WWII, mainly by Albanian paramilitaries such as the Vullnetari and Balli Kombëtar. Between 70,000 and 100,000 Kosovar Serbs were transferred to concentration camps in Pristina and Mitrovica or expelled to Serbia proper, in order to Albanianize the province. By 1942, the city of Bar became a home of many Serbs and Montenegrins and other refugees who were forced to flee from Kosovo and to escape the violence done by Albanian units. Many of these joined the Partisan forces and participated in their activities in Bar.

By the end of World War II, Serbian Partisans, including the 27th Serb Brigade, retook Kosovo, a region with a majority Albanian population. Albanian resistance movements opposed the return of Serbian and Montenegrin forces. On 13 March 1945, Miladin Popović, a Montenegrin by origin, was killed in Pristina. During this period, Shaban Polluzha, a prominent Albanian commander of the Drenica Brigade, initially collaborated with the Albanian Partisans of the 6th Brigade. However, with the entry of over 60,000 Serbian forces into Kosovo, numerous violent incidents occurred, including massacres of Albanians in Gjilan, Ferizaj, Dukagjin, Podujevë, and Drenica. Polluzha defied Yugoslav directives, which sought to deploy Albanian men to pursue retreating German forces in the Syrmian Front in Serbia, as long as Serbian and Montenegrin brigades remained stationed in Kosovo, strengthening their control over the region. Following the violence in his home region of Drenica, Polluzha refused Yugoslav Partisan orders and returned to Drenica.

In January 1945, upon returning to Drenica, Polluzha and his forces engaged in intense battles against Serbian and Montenegrin Partisans, particularly the 27th Communist Brigade and the 1st Communist Brigade of Kosovo. Despite fierce resistance, he was ultimately defeated and killed on 21 February 1945 in Tërstenik, Drenica. Though the 27th Serb Brigade suffered heavy losses in these clashes, their defeat further fueled Serbian efforts to deploy Kosovo Albanians, targeting young men to prevent future uprisings. According to Albanian historians from Kosovo, it is presumed that the massacre occurred as vengeance for all these matters in Kosovo.

== Massacre ==
The victims were Albanians from Kosovo, who hid in the mountains in order to avoid being mobilized into the Yugoslav Partisans. During the spring of 1945, Kosovo Albanian men in several echelons were forcibly mobilized under the guise of joining the fight against retreating German forces or to help National Liberation Movement of Albania with the invitation of Enver Hoxha. These men were captured, then assembled in Prizren and marched on foot in three columns to Bar where they were supposed to receive short training and then sent off to the front.

The march took the rugged mountain ranges of Kosovo and Albania to reach its destination. Over the course of March and April, approximately 13,000 men were deported from Kosovo and Macedonia via Bar, in four echelons to the Adriatic Front. Upon arrival, locals reported that these men, who had marched a considerable distance, were "exhausted" and "distressed".

Upon arrival in Bar, the first echelon of Kosovo Albanian men was divided into three distinct groups, each facing drastically different fates. The first group, consisting of approximately 1,200 men, was transported by ferry to Trogir, Croatia, for deployment to the Adriatic Front. In one April night, 65 of these men drowned while crossing to Čiovo. According to historical records, the second group of 400–500 Albanian men was forcibly marched into an old military barracks in Bar. Once inside, they found themselves isolated, with no possibility of escape, as armed forces maintained strict control over the facility. Meanwhile, the third group, comprising 450–500 men, was led to an outdoor area under the presumption of undergoing medical sanitation procedures, specifically delousing. However, instead of receiving medical assistance, they found themselves surrounded by hostile local forces, leading to panic spreading among the prisoners. The presence of American military observers stationed nearby temporarily halted further bloodshed. While many lives had already been lost, the fear of international scrutiny led the forces to delay or reconsider their actions. Ultimately, their involvement provided some relief, preventing the immediate execution of those detained.

According to Robert Elsie and Butka, on 26 March 1945, the second echelon of Kosovar Albanians, numbering approximately 2,370 men, departed from Prizren. They were led to Shkodra, finally reaching on 30 March. Along the way, an estimated 700–800 men lost their lives during the road.

Albanian Franciscan priest Zef Pllumi wrote about the state of the Albanian soldiers upon their arrival at Shkodra as follows:

At the turn in the road we saw an endless stream of soldiers coming towards us. It was a winding road and at each of its turns there were men in that uniform we so hated. We were petrified. We scrambled up onto the rocks, as if for a rest, and waited to see what new tragedy would befall Shkodra with the arrival of a new brigade of partisans. When they got closer and marched past us, we could see more clearly who they were. Only the commanders leading the column of men in lines of four were armed. All the rest of the young men were thin and weakened. No bellies, sunburnt and with protruding cheekbones, weary and exhausted, with buttonless, tattered uniforms, and no weapons. They advanced slowly, plodding forth with great difficulty in rows of four. We were horrified. What could this army be? They hardly had energy to stand on their feet. At a certain distance on both sides of the column, there were armed guards shouting at them: "Get a move on, hurry up!" One of the men, at death’s door, had the courage to speak to us: "For the love of God, give me something to eat. Have you got any bread? ... A few days later, word spread in Shkodra that somewhere near Ulqin (Ulcinj), the partisans had killed all of the young men from Kosovo. Oh Lord, tell me what sins these men had committed that they deserved such punishment!

— Zef Pllumi, Rrno për me tregue

Upon their arrival in Bar, the Kosovo Albanian unarmed recruits were met with an atmosphere of hostility and militarization. The local army and civilian population had mobilized, taking up arms and positioning themselves strategically throughout the town, from every strategic vantage point.

According to other sources, the column was halted beside a water fountain, a deliberate act designed to exploit their desperation for water. The expectation was that some would break ranks to quench their thirst, providing a pretext for mass execution. However, the men, aware of the staged nature of the scene, refrained from acting impulsively. In an attempt to negotiate access to water, Jahir Murtezi, Ramadan Mihaliqi, and Sylë Ali Morina approached the officer guarding the fountain. Their request was met harshly, culminating in the officer ordering his men to open fire. Murtezi and Mihaliqi were killed instantly, while Morina narrowly escaped back to the column under a hail of bullets. The violence escalated further when Serbian and Montenegrin soldiers accused Morina of seizing a weapon and killing one of their own during his retreat. This accusation led to his execution, as soldiers repeatedly shot and stabbed him with bayonets. Although the forces eventually withdrew to fortified positions, the impact of the ordeal left the men in a state of shock. Following these events, by the order given by the commanders of the Montenegrin and Serbian Partisans, the actual massacre took place at dawn on 31 March 1945 during which all the unarmed Albanian soldiers who were waiting to drink water were executed on the spot.

The third echelon of around 2,700 Albanian conscripts, primarily from Macedonia, departed Prizren on 27 March 1945 under escort by the 27th Serb Brigade. By the time they reached Shkodra, 2,626 had survived the arduous barefoot march, with typhoid fever spreading among them. On 1 April, while crossing the Buna River, a Slavic guard drowned, prompting others to open fire, killing about 20 Albanian soldiers. The survivors were detained by the Albanian State Security and sent to Yugoslavia. Most arrived in Bar on 2 April and were later transported to a military storehouse in Old Dubrovnik. There, on 18 April, a fire ignited stored chemicals, producing toxic fumes that killed between 650 and 800 men.

According to one account, the column of men which stretched a few kilometres were gathered on the Barsko Polje. At one point, in Barsko, one of the Albanians from the column attacked and killed one of the Yugoslav officers, Božo Dabanović. Very soon after that somebody from the column threw a smuggled bomb at the commander of the brigade. This created a panic among the Partisans. The guards watching over the recruits then fired into the crowd killing many and prompting the survivors to flee into the surrounding mountains. In another case, several hundred Albanians were herded into a tunnel, near Bar, which was subsequently sealed off so that all of those trapped within the tunnel were asphyxiated. Uran Butka casts doubt on the claims that the men engaged in armed resistance, given that they were disarmed in Prizren before their forced march to Bar. The recruits, having endured a grueling journey across mountainous terrain under harsh conditions, were in a physically weakened state. Moreover, reports of events at Barsko Polje including allegations of an Albanian conscript assassinating a Yugoslav officer and the subsequent detonation of a smuggled bomb, must be critically assessed with the possibility of fabricated or exaggerated narratives, in order to justify reprisal killings.

Other sources cited that the killing started en route for no apparent reason and this was supported by the testimony of Zoi Themeli in his 1949 trial. After the massacre, the site was immediately covered in concrete by the Yugoslav communist regime and built an airport on top of the mass grave.

== Death toll ==
Yugoslav sources put the number of victims at 400 while other sources put the figure at 2,000 killed in Bar alone. According to Croatian historian Ljubica Štefan, the Partisans killed 1,600 Albanians in Bar on 1 April. There are also accounts claiming that the victims included young boys. Journalist Haxhi Birinxhiku states that there were 2995 victims.
