= Battle of Novi Pazar (1941) =

1941 battle in German-occupied Serbia

- Part of World War II in Yugoslavia
Date	November – December 1941
Location	Novi Pazar, German-occupied territory of Serbia (modern-day Serbia)
Result	Albanian victory: Albanians launch a counter-offensive towards Raška; Germans eventually enter Novi Pazar in December

Belligerents
Albania; Sandžak Muslim militia Germany	Chetniks Montenegrin partisans

Commanders and leaders
Shaban Polluzha; Bilal Dreshaj; Aćif Hadžiahmetović; Jakub Kardović; Džemail Koničanin	(Chetniks) Radomir Cvetić † (Chetniks) Vojislav Lukačević; Sveta Trifunović

Units involved
Albanian gendarmerie Vullnetari; Local elements of the Sandžak Muslim militia	(Chetniks) Studenica—Deževo detachment; Kopaonik detachment (two companies)

Strength
600	Unknown

Casualties and losses
60 killed 23 wounded	83 killed 48 wounded
- Civilian victims of terror: 115 Serbs and 61 Muslims

The Battle of Novi Pazar was fought during World War II, between the Pro-Axis Albanian forces against Chetniks and Partisans in the city of Novi Pazar, Sandžak, in the German-occupied Kingdom of Yugoslavia. Despite launching three assaults, the Chetniks and Partisans failed to capture Novi Pazar from the Albanian forces defending it.

During World War II, the territory of Sandžak was the subject of territorial disputes between Germany, Italy, as well as the local Muslim and Albanian populations. Due to the multiple insurgent, ethnic and religious groups in the region, persecution and genocide of Serbs, Jews and Romani people characterised the conflict in Yugoslavia.

== Background ==
=== Axis invasion of Yugoslavia ===
The Axis invasion of Yugoslavia began on 6 April 1941, and within several days it was conquered by Axis forces. On 17 April German troops, the 60th Infantry Division and the 8th Panzer Division, captured the city of Novi Pazar. Yugoslavia was then partitioned between the Axis powers. On 23 April it was agreed that the city would fall within the German occupation zone.

=== Uprisings in Montenegro and Serbia ===
The Uprising in Montenegro occurred on 13 July 1941 and spread into areas of Sandžak. To prevent the uprising from spreading further, Italian forces used various Muslim irregular units from Sandžak, Metohija and Kosovo to intimidate and expel local Serbs, who were considered to be supporters of the movement. During the month, several groups spread disorder in regions surrounding the towns of Rožaje, Plav, Gusinje, Tutin and Pešter.

The situation in Novi Pazar was sensitive, as local Serbs were ruled over by Muslim governors. At the beginning of August 1941, many Serbs began resisting Muslim rule. On 27 October, an agreement was made to divide the region of Sandžak between Germany and Italy. However, Novi Pazar remained under German control, together with Mitrovica and small area of the Sjenica municipality, Duga Poljana.

Many armed conflicts between the Chetniks and Albanian-Muslim forces occurred during the period between October and December 1941, with a front being established between Raška and Novi Pazar. Consequently, civilian villages were often destroyed by both sides. Between June and December 1941, 60 Serbs were killed and a further 144 imprisoned, and 2,016 Serb homes and 776 Muslim homes were destroyed in Novi Pazar. On 23 September, the Chetniks attacked Albanian forces on Rogozna mountain and captured it after a day-long battle. Conflict in the region between the two forces lasted until the end of September.

At the end of October 1941, the Chetniks and the Partisan Kopaonik detachment agreed to attack Novi Pazar together. It was decided that the Chetniks were to attack Novi Pazar from the northern side while the Partisans were to attack from the southern side.

== Forces ==
Germans followed their strategy to protect only points of vital importance during the uprising in Serbia. To protect the lead mine they moved their forces from Novi Pazar to Mitrovica on 4 October. Germans armed units of Albanian Gendarmerie was left to protect the town. In period between 5 October and 7 December 1941 (when German forces returned to Novi Pazar) all Serbs in the town were forbidden to leave the town according to the order of Hadžiahmetović, in order to prevent them to join Chetniks or to inform them about the forces in the town.

On 7 October the first group of Albanian forces commanded by Shaban Polluzha came to Novi Pazar. Hadžiahmetović emphasized that this group turned Serb populated Ibarski Kolašin into dust and ash. In October 1941 the total number of Albanian forces that came to Novi Pazar was around 500. Around 100 Muslim forces from Tutin and Sjenica with forces of Bilall Dreshaj also came to defend Novi Pazar.

== Battle ==
=== Early November attack on Novi Pazar ===
According to the agreed plan, two companies of the Kopaonik Partisan detachment under command of Sveta Trifunović took control over the road between Novi Pazar and Kosovska Mitrovica to prevent armed Albanian forces to use this road to reach the town. One Chetnik detachment joined them and burned some Muslim houses. The next day, Muslim forces from Novi Pazar attacked Serb houses in Trnava and began to burn them. Partisans attacked them and forced them to retreat to Novi Pazar. Because of the split between Chetniks and Partisans Chetniks left their positions at joint Chetnik—Partisan front at Kraljevo in the night between 3 and 4 November. This had direct consequence to Chetnik-Partisan cooperation at Novi Pazar where Partisan forces left their positions to fill the gap at Kraljevo.

Chetniks attacked the town on 4 November at 4 a.m. They managed to advance toward the town until 7 a.m. when the rear flanks of one Chetnik unit were attacked by Muslim forces under command of Bilall Dreshaj, Džemail Koničanin and Mullah Jakup. This caused dismay of this Chetnik unit which retreated from already captured positions. Muslim forces regrouped and pushed back the Chetnik forces who advanced on another part of front (Petrova Crkva — Đurđevi Stupovi — Parničko brdo — Vidovo). The Chetnik casualties were 83 killed and 48 wounded, while defending forces had 60 killed and 23 wounded.

The defenders' success in the battle was celebrated in Novi Pazar, people waved Albanian flags and shouted glorifying Greater Albania. Armed bands killed dozens of Serbs in Novi Pazar in only a couple of hours. Dreshaj's men carried cut off heads stuck on the bayonets of their rifles and threw them on the garbage. To prevent further killings Mulla Jakub proposed to imprison all Serbs older than 18 years. Ahmetović accepted this proposal with intention to use imprisoned Serbs as hostages in the future negotiations with Chetniks.

=== Attack on Raška ===
To provide additional forces, arms and ammunition Hadžiahmetović sent his men to neighboring regions of Yugoslavia annexed to Albania and Italy. Within a couple of days additional forces came to Novi Pazar, mostly from Kosovo, so the total number of armed men in Novi Pazar on 10 November 1941 was around 3,150. A number of guns, machine guns and ammunition was also brought into the town. This encouraged Hadžiahmetović to try to expand borders of the Greater Albania by capturing Chetnik controlled Raška. To buy some time Hadžiahmetović concluded peace agreement with Chetniks on 10 November 1941. According to this agreement Muslims guaranteed safety to Serbs while Chetniks guaranteed safety to Muslims who lived on the territory under their control. During next couple of days additional Albanian and Muslim forces arrived to Novi Pazar. On 14 November Hadžiahmetović had around 5,000 armed men and made decision to attack Raška and burn all Serb villages in the region. On 15 November his forces began with burning of numerous Serb villages and killed many people.

On 16 November at 10 a.m. Muslim and Albanian forces attacked Raška. They quickly advanced toward the town. The situation for the defenders became very difficult, so Vojislav Lukačević, the person of the biggest confidence of Mihailović, personally engaged in the defence of the town. In the late hours of November 16 Albanian forces reached suburbs of Raška, and the town would have fallen if many of unit commanders weren't more interested in plundering that military targets. Failure to capture the town, meant Hadžiahmetović's troops lost momentum and gave time Chetniks to regroup. Villagers from burned villages rallied and joined the defenders. On 17 November they stopped the advance of Hadžiahmetović's forces and forced them to retreat. Attackers had 106 killed men while defenders had killed 34 men, without people killed during burning of the villages. There were significant number of Serb refugees during this attack on Raška, which "District Board for Refugees" estimated to be at 948 families with 6725 members.

=== Late November and early December attacks on Novi Pazar ===
Chetniks attacked Novi Pazar again on 21 November 1941. Vojislav Lukačević, one of the closest associates of Draža Mihailović, participated in this attack. During this attack Chetniks burned all Muslim villages from Požega to Vučinići. Chetniks failed to capture Novi Pazar and retreated suffering casualties of 42 killed men, while defenders had 26 killed. Both sides had around 45 wounded. On 5 December the last Chetnik attempt to capture Novi Pazar failed. Based on the false information that communists captured some parts of Novi Pazar, German forces returned to the town on 7 December 1941.

The epilogue of struggle between Chetniks and Muslim and Albanian forces in the region of Novi Pazar was 447 killed people (287 Serbs, 136 Muslims and 144 Albanians). The victims of terror of the conflicting parties were 115 Serbs and 61 Muslims.

== Sources ==
- Ćuković, Mirko (1964). Sandžak. Nolit-Prosveta.
- Živković, Milutin (2011). "Dešavanja u Sandžaku od julskog ustanka do kraja 1941 godine" (PDF). Baština (in Serbian). 31. Priština, Leposavić: Institute for Serbian Culture.
- Živković, Milutin D. (2017). Санџак 1941–1943 [Sandžak 1941–1943] (Doctoral) (in Serbo-Croatian). Belgrade: University of Belgrade. OCLC 1242119546.
