= Bilall Dreshaj =

Albanian Sandzak collaborator with Fascist Italy

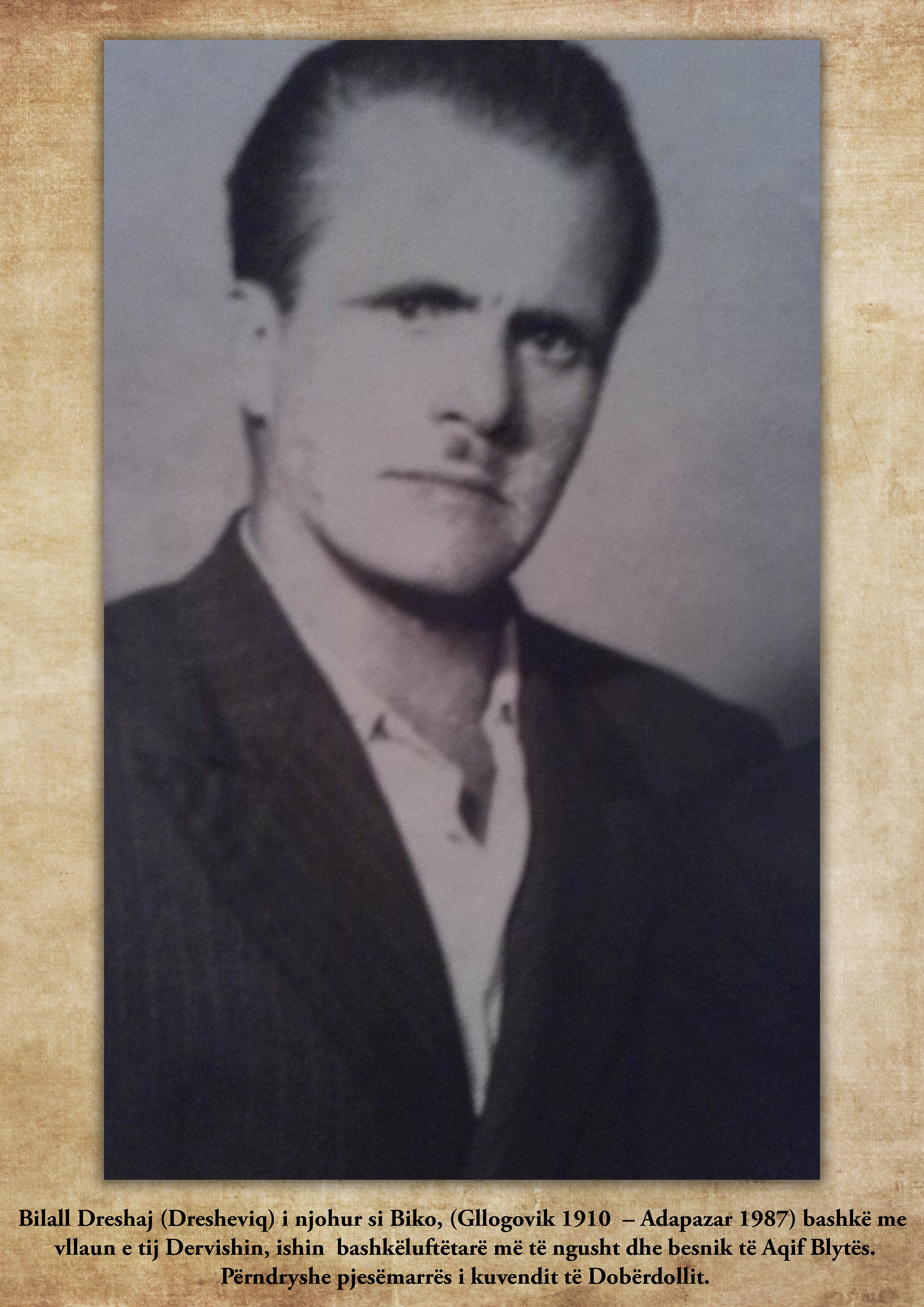
Bikë Pazari, Dresheviq

Bilall Dreshaj (1910–1987), better known as Biko, was an ethnic Albanian military leader and Nazi collaborationist in Kosovo and Novi Pazar in Yugoslavia.

He was born in the village of Glogovik, Tutin, the part of the Ottoman Empire. During World War II he fought in the Battle for Novi Pazar against the communists and the Chetniks.

== World War II ==
Bilall Dreshaj and his men were legalized to the occupier by Aćif Hadžiahmetović, Sandzak collaborationist mayor of Novi Pazar. On October 5 Dreshaj entered the city with noise and gunfire and put themselves under command of local authorities. Billal Dreshaj with his brother Deko led an attack on villages of Gračane, Doljane and Zabrđe on November 2, which their troops burnt down, killing 11 Serbs in the action.

During the Battle of Novi Pazar, Dreshaj's men defended the left wing of the main column. He was one of the main organisers of protests against arrival of Milan Nedić's troops in Novi Pazar during November 1942. Later in the war, Dreshaj became an officer in the Hilfspolizei.

== Sources ==
- Živković, Milutin (2017). Санџак 1941-1943 [Sanžak 1941-1943] (in Serbo-Croatian). Belgrade: University of Belgrade.
