= Polac =

Village in Skënderaj, Kosovo

Polac: Polac (Albanian); Пољанце/Poljance (Serbian)
- Village
- Location in Kosovo
- Coordinates: 42°44′16″N 20°49′24″E
- Location: Kosovo
- District: Mitrovicë
- Municipality: Skënderaj
- First mention: 1330

Area
  - Total: 84.7 sq mi (219.5 km^{2})
- Elevation: 2,100 ft (640 m)

Population (2024)
  - Total: 2,115
- Time zone: UTC+1 (CET)
  - Summer (DST): UTC+2 (CEST)
- Area code: +381 290

Polac (defined Albanian form: Polaci; Serbian: Пољанце / Poljance) is a village located in the Drenica region, within the municipality of Skenderaj in Kosovo. Historically significant as the ancestral home of the prominent Albanian politician and independence leader Hasan Prishtina, the village features a rich local history dating back to antiquity.

The village is exclusively inhabited by ethnic Albanians; in the 2024 census, it had 2,115 inhabitants.

== Geography ==
It lies in the Drenica region, at the source of the Vërbicë river, a left confluence of the Drenica river. It is situated on both sides of the regional Skenderaj-Drenas road, approximately 4–7 km southeast of Skenderaj. The village lies at an elevation of 640–680 m above sea level and covers a total cadastral area of 2,195 hectares.

Monument and family tree plaque in Polac (Drenica), showing the Veliu ancestors of Hasan Prishtina

Polac is traditionally divided into historical neighborhoods or mahalas, which are named after the local Albanian clan families and landmarks: Veliu, Xhamia, Gruda, Kerolli, Koci, Hoti, Kabashi and Zani. The Veliu neighborhood is historically significant as the ancestral home of the Veliu branch of the Berisha tribe, from which the Albanian national figure Hasan Prishtina descended.

== History ==
=== Middle Ages ===
The 1330 Dečani chrysobulls of Serbian King Stephen Uroš III (r. 1322–1331) mention the great village of "Strelac", and several surrounding villages: Čigotovo (Čikatovo), Vrbovec, Poljance, Glabotino and Kudrino (Kudrin). Toponomastic study shows that Poljance bordered Strelac on the northeast.

=== World War II ===
6 soldiers, hailing from Polac, of the "Boro Bukmirović" and "Razim Sadiku" battalions of the First Macedonian-Kosovan National liberation Brigade (Yugoslav Partisans) fell in January and February 1945 during an uprising in Drenica.

=== Kosovo War ===
According to the Serbian newspaper Pravda in January in February 1997, Jonuz Veliqi, an Albanian official working for the state structures of the Republic of Serbia, was nearly killed by during attacks of the Albanian paramilitaries. On August 3, 1998, a civilian worker for the Serbian Interior Ministry was wounded by an automatic weapon. Poljance was in the hands of the Kosovo Liberation Army until March 22, 1999, when Serbian police forces launched an offensive into Drenica. After March 23, 1999, several abducted ethnic Serbs were held prisoners in an old mine near a brick factory in Poljance by Albanians. The KLA regained control of Polac in 31 March 1999 when the Yugoslavs began their withdrawal from the positions in Drenica after fighting in the area.

== Demographics ==
Demographic history
Ethnic group	1948	1953	1961	1971	1981	1991	2011
Albanians					2358		2695
Total	1077	1304	1408	1675	2358	2827	2701

== Notable people ==
- Hasan Prishtina
