= Drenica Uprising (1945) =

Rebellion in Kosovo

- Part of the aftermath of Kosovo during World War II
| Date | January - February, 1945 |
| Location | Drenica, AP Kosovo, Yugoslavia (now Kosovo) |
| Result | Yugoslav victory: Uprising suppressed; Dissolution of the Drenica Brigade |

Belligerents
| Albanian insurgents | (Socialist Federal Republic of Yugoslavia) Yugoslav Partisans |

Commanders and leaders
| Shaban Polluzha †; Miftar Bajraktari †; Mehmet Gradica †; Gani Llaushi † | (Socialist Federal Republic of Yugoslavia) Josip Broz Tito (Socialist Federal Republic of Yugoslavia) Aleksandar Ranković (Socialist Federal Republic of Yugoslavia) Fadil Hoxha (Socialist Federal Republic of Yugoslavia) Sava Drljević (Socialist Federal Republic of Yugoslavia) Petar Brajović (WIA) |

Strength
| 6,500 soldiers | 40,000 soldiers |

Casualties and losses
| around 430 killed | Heavy |
- 6,000 displaced and 150 homes burned

The Drenica Uprising was an armed rebellion by ethnic Albanian fighters in the Drenica region of central Kosovo against the newly established Yugoslav Partisans and the communist government of Democratic Federal Yugoslavia. The uprising began on 22 January 1945 and ended with its suppression on 18 February 1945. The revolt was led by Shaban Polluzha and involved local fighters resisting forced conscription, communist repression, and the centralization policies of the Yugoslav state.

== Background ==
The uprising was sparked after reports of mass killings carried out by Partisans against Albanian civilians in late 1944 and early 1945. One notable incident involved the execution of 75 Albanian notables, whose bodies were dumped into mass graves. According to documents from the Archives of the Secretariat of Interior of Kosovo, the movement was made up of roughly 6,000 to 20,000 local fighters, including former Partisans who defected. They faced approximately 12 to 15 brigades of Yugoslav forces—an estimated 36,000 to 50,000 troops—including Serbs, Montenegrins, Bulgarians, and some Albanians.

== Uprising ==
The fighting started on 22 January 1945 with the insurgents using guerrilla tactics, ambushing Yugoslav forces in villages. During this day, Albanian forces attacked the village of Kolla controlled by the 26th Yugoslav Brigade, killing and capturing many Yugoslav soldiers as well as large amounts of ammunition.

After the battle of Kolla, clashes would break out across all of Drenica, with the most significant ones occurring in Rezalla, Llausha and Prekaz. Throughout these clashes most villages would fall into insurgent hands. In late January, Shaban Polluzha would attack the town of Skenderaj, successfully capturing it and establishing a base there. Yugoslav forces would attempt to take back the town in February, however their offensive failed. From January to February in the village of Polac, 6 Yugoslav partisan soldiers from the "Boro Bukmirović" and "Razim Sadiku" battalions of the First Macedonian-Kosovan National Liberation Brigade had been killed.

At the end of January, a group of insurgents led by Adem Voca began a northern offensive, attacking the Stari Trg mine, killing the Yugoslav troops guarding it, and capturing the mine. Adem Voca's men continued their offensive, capturing several villages near Mitrovica. However, when they attempted to capture the city they would be surrounded by Yugoslav troops. After heavy fighting, the Albanian insurgents retreated, as Adem Voca himself was injured. The remaining insurgents fled to the village of Pantin, where in early February, they would be encircled by Yugoslav soldiers. The fighting would be fierce, however the Albanian insurgents would break through the Yugoslav lines, who in turn retreated.

After the battle of Pantin, Adem Voca called-off his uprising, due to a lack of ammunition and the harsh winter. He would then barricade himself in his kulla located in his hometown village of Sumë. On 10 February his home was attacked by the 3rd battalion of the 25th Yugoslav brigade. The fighting would last until the 12th of February, with all of the 17 Voca family members, including women and children being killed. According to Albanian sources it is said that the Voca family killed 92 Partisans.

By mid-February, the rebellion was crushed. Shaban Polluzha and other key leaders—including Miftar Bajraktari, Mehmet Gradica, and Gani Llaushi—were killed in battle alongside 430 Albanian rebels. Yugoslav Partisans suffered heavy losses in the battle with 2,550 killed, 6,000 wounded and 850 captured. The Partisans responded with punitive actions, burning down more than 150 homes in Drenica and displacing over 6,000 civilians.
