= Tërstenik, Drenas =

Village in Drenas, Kosovo

Tërstenik Trstenik
- Village
- Location in Kosovo
- Coordinates: 42.657515°N 20.854415°E
- Location: Kosovo
- District: Pristina
- Municipality: Drenas

Population (2024)
  - Total: 3,017
- Time zone: UTC+1 (Central European Time)
  - Summer (DST): UTC+2 (CEST)

Tërstenik (Albanian definite form: Tërsteniku), or Trstenik (Serbian Cyrillic: Трстеник), is a village in the district of Pristina, Kosovo. It is located west of Pristina.
