= Shaban Polluzha =

Albanian military leader (1871–1945)

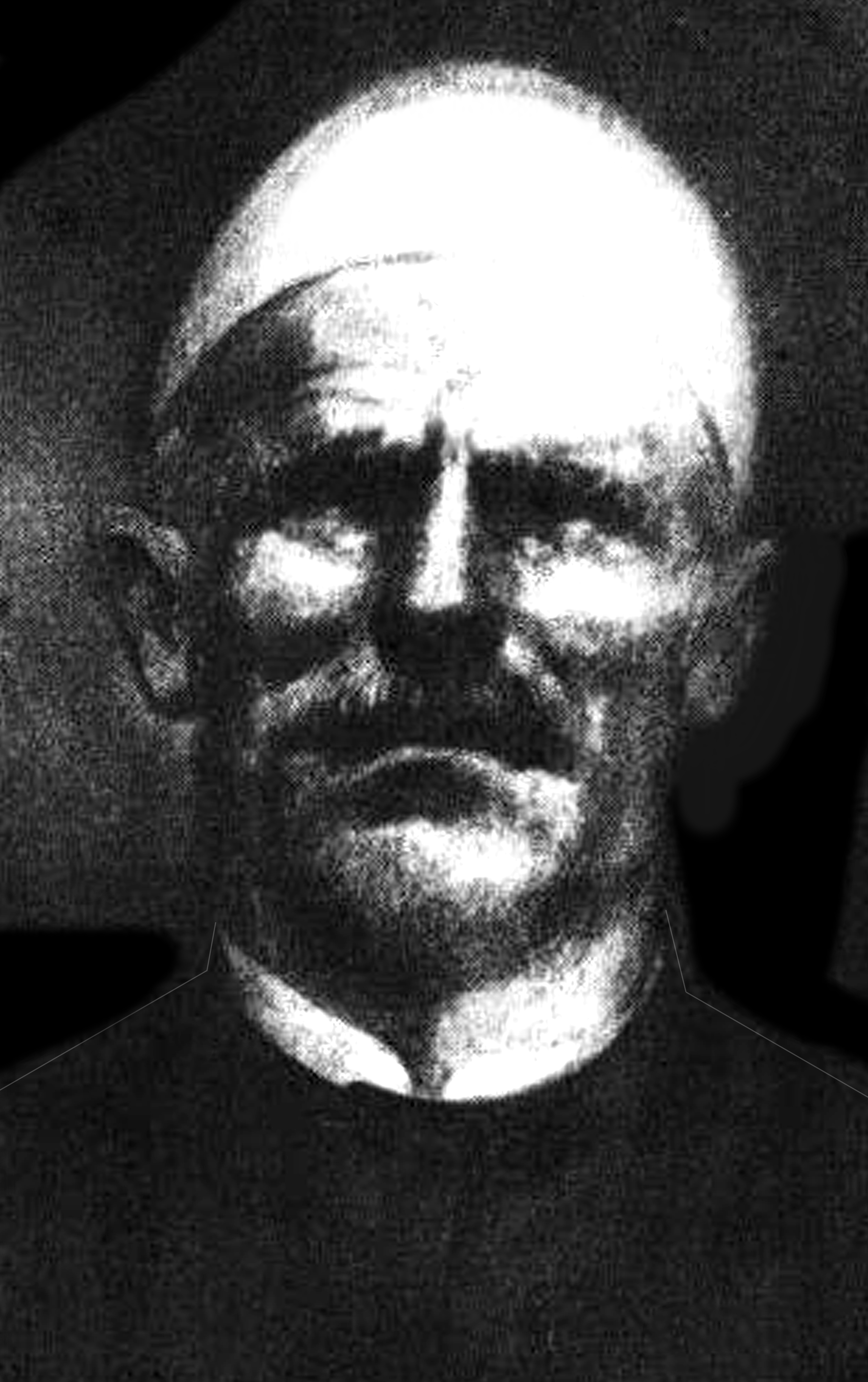
- Born: 1871; Polluzha, Skenderaj, Ottoman Empire (now Polluzha, Skenderaj, Kosovo)
- Died: 21 February 1945 (aged 73–74); Tërstenik, Drenas, DF Yugoslavia (now Tërstenik, Drenas, Kosovo)
- Burial place: Tërstenik, Drenas, Kosovo
- Military career
- Allegiance: Italian protectorate of Albania; Albanian Kingdom (German client)
- Branch: Royal Albanian Army
- Service years: 1941–1945
- Rank: Commander
- Unit: Vulnetari
- Commands: Balli Kombëtar
- Conflicts: World War I; Kachak Movement; World War II; Battle for Novi Pazar; Kosovo Uprising (1945); Drenica Uprising (1945) †
- Awards: Hero of Kosovo; Hero of Albania

Shaban Mustafë Kastrati (1871 – 21 February 1945), known as Shaban Polluzha, was a Kosovo Albanian military leader. His allegiances frequently changed, with him at first aligning with the Axis forces and then aligning with the Allied forces, and later on was known for leading the Drenica uprising against the Yugoslav Forces in 1945. Until 1941, he served in the Royal Albanian gendarmerie and as a commander of the Vulnetari militia, and then served as a member of the Partisan party. He was briefly a member of the Balli Kombëtar. He was designated a National Hero of Kosovo.

== Early life ==
Shaban was born in Polluzha, in the Drenica region (now central Kosovo). He came from a middle-class family and he was not educated, but as a young man he became involved in political life due to the circumstances and injustices of the occupying regimes.

== World War I and II ==
He fought against the Bulgarians and Austrians during the First World War; afterwards he fought for the Kaçak movement against the Kingdom of Yugoslavia. In 1924 he was part of a unit led by Azem Galica, and he covered their retreat to Albanian territory after Galica had been wounded.

Shaban Polluzha was one of the most famous commanders of the Drenica area during the Second World War. During the war, he was also the commander of a part of the front in Montenegro, Kolašin and Sandžak, where he distinguished himself for organization and strategy. He was a member of the Islihat Council (peace court) and, on the proposal of Miftar Bajraktari, he was appointed chairman of the Islihat in Drenica.

In 1941, Shaban Polluzha and his family were imprisoned in Peje because he opposed cooperating with the Italians. Initially, Polluzha was associated with Balli Kombëtar, and during the war he maintained close ties with the anti-fascist National Liberation Movement (Albania) and Yugoslav Partisans, believing their promise that Kosovo would be given self-determination. Around December 1944, attempts were made to forcefully mobilize Kosovo Albanians into the Yugoslav Army. Shaban Polluzha became commander of the Drenica Brigade, which was founded in December 1944 to support the Sixth Albanian Brigade.

On 7 October 1941, Shaban Polluzha and 60 of his men came to Novi Pazar to aid the forces of the town's collaborationist mayor Aćif Hadžiahmetović, who had the ambition to incorporate Novi Pazar into Greater Albania. During the Battle of Novi Pazar, Polluzha was blamed by the city's defense committee for their failed counteroffensive targeting Raška, as his men were 'only interested in plundering'. He left the city on 19 December. He was later arrested in Mitrovica, and his loot was confiscated.

After talks with Fadil Hoxha in late 1944, the brigade was to follow the orders of the Yugoslav command and go north to the front in Syrmia. However, Polluzha was very hesitant and rejected the order, saying that he wanted to stay in Kosovo and defend his home region of Drenica against attacks on Albanians by Chetnik groups. His force of roughly 8,000 men was then attacked by Yugoslav Partisan units in January 1945. It has been estimated that more than 20,000 local Albanians joined Polluzha, the leader of the anti-Yugoslav uprising; fighting in Drenica continued until March, and (mainly Serbian) soldiers destroyed 44 villages there.

Shaban Polluzha was killed by Serbian Partisans in Trstenik on 21 February 1945.

Another uprising of Albanians who refused to leave Kosovo broke out in Mitrovica in February 1945. Yugoslav military operations proceeded with the destruction of the Drenica brigade; by March the revolt was crushed and thousands of Albanians (soldiers and civilians) were killed.

Remains of the Seventh Brigade as well as new recruits, who were recruited deceitfully by telling them that they were to be sent to Albania because Hoxha had called them, were gathered in military barracks in Prizren, disarmed and found themselves made prisoners there; this "was the starting point of the saga which became known as the Bar Tragedy".

== Legacy ==
He was posthumously awarded as "Hero of Kosovo" by the Prime Minister of the Republic of Kosovo, Hashim Thaçi in 2012, later sparked post-WWII controversy and criticism.

== Sources ==
- Elsie, Robert (2010). Historical Dictionary of Kosovo. Scarecrow Press. p. 219. ISBN 978-0-8108-7231-8.
- Malcolm, Noel. "Kosovo." A short history, London (1998).
- Milković, Milutin (1991). PRVA KOSOVSKO-METOHIJSKA PROLETERSKA BRIGADA. Војна штампарија.
- Roszkowski, W., & Kofman, J. (2016). Biographical dictionary of Central and Eastern Europe in the twentieth century. Routledge, p. 793 - 794.
- Živković, Milutin (2017). Санџак 1941-1943 [Sanžak 1941-1943] (in Serbo-Croatian). Belgrade: University of Belgrade.
- Azizi, Ismet. (2022) Aćif ef. Hadžiahmetović-Bljuta: Velikan Sandžaka, Fondacion"Memorijalni centar Handžet", Novi Pazar Faqet 516,:ISBN 978-86-904604-0-3
