= Vullnetari =

Vulnetari
- Active: 1941—1946
- Allegiance: Italy (1941–43): Albania; Germany (1943–44): Albania
- Branch: Militia
- Type: Infantry
- Role: Axis auxiliaries
- Size: 5,000 — 6,000
- Colors: red and black
- Engagements: World War II in Yugoslavia: Uprising in Montenegro; Battle for Novi Pazar; Operation Draufgänger; Kosovo Operation

Commanders
- Notable commanders: Shaban Polluzha; Rizë Umeri; Sali Barjaktari; Zhukë Axhija; Sali Rama; Ramë Alija; Idriz Rexha; Kadri Bistrica; Sali Boletini

Insignia
- Identification symbol: black-red band around their arms

The Vullnetari ("the volunteer") were an Axis collaborationist volunteer militia of Albanians from Kosovo set up in 1941 by Italian forces after the successful invasion of Yugoslavia. They served as an auxiliary force for civilian control and protection of villages.

Some of the militia served as frontier guards under both Italian and German rule. The Vulnetari fought only in their own local areas, so they fought against both Partisans and Chetniks, "against whom they showed themselves skilled and determined fighters". The Vulnetari of the region of Gjakova went to Plav and Gusinje to support the Italian counteroffensive during the Uprising in Montenegro.

Independently, Vulnetari units often attacked ethnic Serbs and carried out raids against civilian targets. According to Serbian scholars, the Vulnetari burned down hundreds of Serbian and Montenegrin villages, killed many people, and carried out plundering campaigns in Kosovo, and neighboring regions.

At the end of World War II, the militia was used to protect retreating German forces. After German forces retreated through Kosovo, members of the Vulnetari militia dispersed in their villages.

== Name ==
The name of this unit is derived from Albanian word Vullnetarë (volunteers).They were also known by the demonym "Kosovars".

== History ==
Confiscations of Albanian land and settlement of Serbian colonists throughout the interwar period drove some Kosovar Albanians during the Second World War to collaborate with the Axis powers who promised a Greater Albania. During the Invasion of Yugoslavia in April 1941 Albanian volunteers put themselves at disposal of general Eberhard, the commander of German 60th Infantry division. They felt that anything would be better than the chauvinism, corruption, administrative hegemonism and exploitation they had experienced under the Serbian authorities during interwar period. The Vulnetari were mostly middle-aged Albanian peasants who lived at their homes and did not wear uniforms but only a black-red band around their arms. They started to undertake actions of revenge, burning Serbian settlements and expelling interwar Serbian and Montenegrin colonists into Serbia proper.

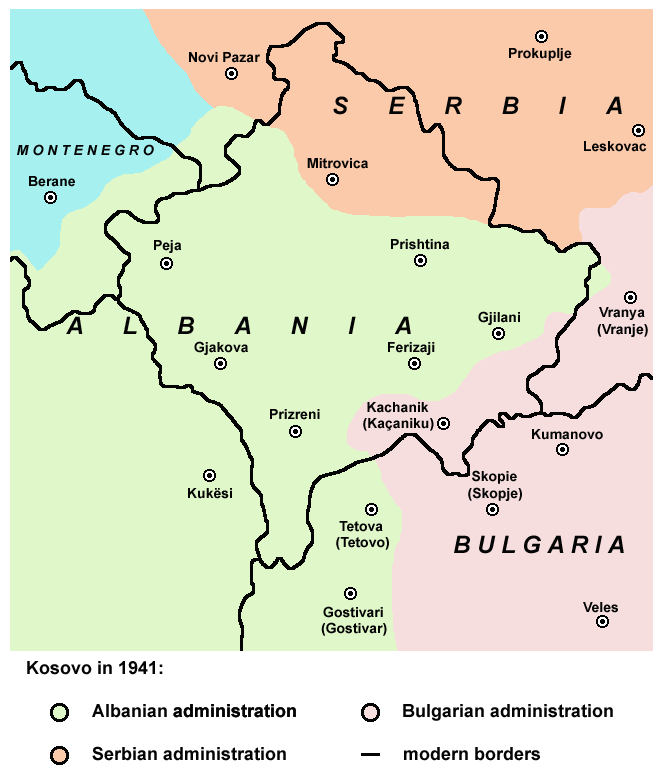
Modern-day region of Kosovo in 1941

According to Smilja Avramov, in June 1941 massacres of the Serbian population in Kosovo took on an organized character as the Vulnetari were established.

The commander of the Vulnetari from Rugova was Riz Umeri. Other commanders included Sali Barjaktari, Zhuk Haxhia and Sali Beba. Ram Alija, from Istog, commanded Vulnetari forces that burned Serbian villages and murdered people in the northern part of Kosovo. During one attack, the forces of Bislim Bajgora, helped by Vulnetari from Drenica led by Idriz Rexha, burned 22 villages and murdered 150 Serbs.

In mid-July 1941, communication was lost between the Central Committee of the Communist Party of Yugoslavia (CK KPJ) and the neighbouring party organizations in Montenegro and Serbia; the regional committee of the KPJ for Kosovo tried to reestablish communication on several occasions and began to move new fighters from their region into Montenegro and Serbia. In two attempts to reach Montenegro and reestablish communication with their Communist organization, more than 20 communists from the Dukagjin region were killed by the Vulnetari.

Thousands of Vulnetari and gendarmes commanded by Bislim Bajgora and Shaban Polluzha attacked northern Kosovo on 30 September 1941. This region was attacked by Vulnetari from Drenica and the Dukagjin region, and their brutal attacks on the villages of northern Kosovo lasted until 10 October 1941. This attack on northern Kosovo was so violent that the Germans referred to it as the "bloody wave".

On 15 October 1941, Chetniks from Suva Planina attacked Vulnetari forces and initially inflicted heavy casualties on them, forcing them to retreat across the Ceranje River but the Vulnetari mamanged to defeat Chetniks later on. The Chetniks entered Ceranje and burned Albanian houses. On the evening of 15 October, strong Vulnetari forces came from Šalja and forced the Chetniks to retreat during the night. On 16 October, the Chetniks again attacked the Vulnetari militia and forced them to retreat across the Ceranje River. After the battles on 14 and 15 October, Chetniks were forced to retreat and all the Serbian houses between Sllatina and Leshak were burned.

On 17 October 1941, the village of Dobrusha, near Peja, was attacked by Vulnetari forces consisting of militiamen from Istok, Drenica and Gjakova. The attack was organized by Xhevat Begolli, the governor of Istog county. Defenders of the village managed to hold on for three days and left the village together with its population. Houses in Dobrusha were then plundered and burned down.

In the period between November and December 1941 groups of Vulnetari forces commanded by Shaban Polluzha were involved in the defence of Novi Pazar from the combined Chetnik-Yugoslav Partisan forces. With the attackers successfully repelled, the mayor of Novi Pazar Aćif Hadžiahmetović, then made the decision to attack Chetnik controlled Raška using the forces he gathered. On 16 November at 10 a.m. Muslim and Albanian forces attacked Raška. They quickly advanced toward the town. The situation for the defenders became very difficult, so Vojislav Lukačević, the person of the biggest confidence of Mihailović, personally engaged in the defence of the town.

On 30 January 1943, the Vulnetari militia captured the village of Grbole and terrorized the residents. At the end of autumn, they expelled the villagers, plundered their houses, and burned them down. Homesteads of the Serb population were routinely sacked by the Vulnetari.

Vulnetari participated in the Operation Draufgänger in July 1944.

Avdyl Dura, from the Kaçanik region, became the commander of 5,000 Vulnetari after the Bulgarian capitulation in September 1944.

== Victims ==
According to Serbian sources, it is estimated that the Vulnetari and other paramilitaries murdered up to 10,000 Serbs and Montenegrins in Kosovo.

== Vulnetari in western Macedonia ==
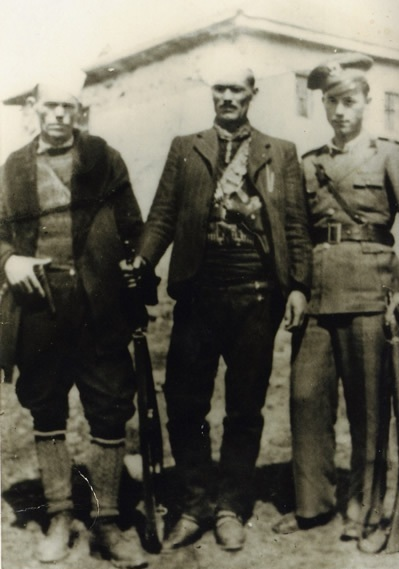
Xhem Hasa (in the middle)

Vulnetari were also set up in western Vardar Macedonia. Five or six companies of between 1,200 and 1,500 vulnetari were set up in Debar.

Around Struga there were two companies of 800 Vulnetari commanded by Bekir aga and Tefik Vlasi. One company of 400 Vulnetari in Rostuša was led by Ali Maliči. The commander of the Kičevo Vulnetari was Mefail, while the commander of the Gostivar Vulnetari was Xhem Hasa.

== Aftermath ==
Sali Rama, Zhukë Haxhija, and several outlaws under their command were arrested and sentenced to prison after World War II. Avdyl Dura surrendered in January 1945 together with about 100 outlaws under his command. Bislim Bajgora was killed in 1947.

In 2010, the Macedonian Albanians political party New Democracy proposed for a monument of Xhemë Hasa to be built in Gostivar. A monument of Hasa has already been built in his birthplace, village Simnica, in 2006.

== Notable people ==
- Rizë Umeri, commander in Rugova
- Shaban Polluzha, General and commander of the Albanian National Army called Vulnetari
- Sali Barjaktari, commander
- Zhukë Haxhija, commander
- Sali Rama, commander
- Ramë Alija, commander from Istok
- Idriz Rexha, commander of the Drenica division (one of the four divisions of the Shaban Polluzhas army)
- Avdyl Dura, commander from Kaçanik
- Xhevat Begolli
- Xhem Hasa, commander in western Macedonia

== See also ==
- Balli Kombëtar
- SS Skanderbeg
