= Aćif Hadžiahmetović =

Yugoslav collaborationist (1887–1945)

- Aqif Blyta
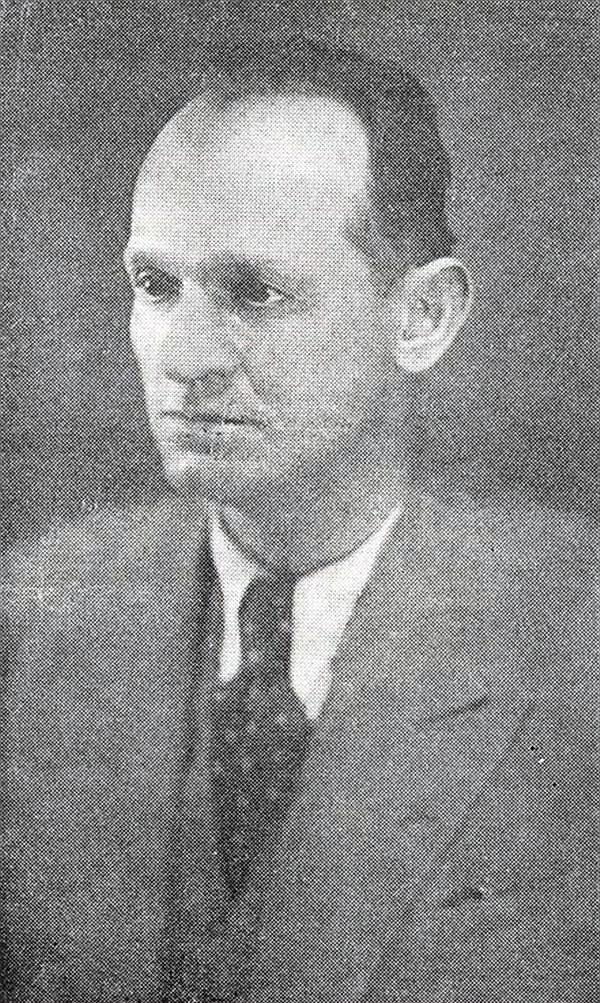
- Aćif c. 1935
- Born: 1887; Novi Pazar, Kosovo Vilayet, Ottoman Empire (now Serbia)
- Died: 21 January 1945 (aged 57–58); Novi Pazar, DF Yugoslavia
- Cause of death: Execution by firing squad
- Citizenship: Ottoman, Yugoslav
- Political party: Džemijet (1919–25)
- Children: 2
- Military career
- Commands: Albanian Gendarmerie
- Awards: Iron Cross (Germany)

Aćif Hadžiahmetović (Serbian Cyrillic: Аћиф Хаџиахметовић, Albanian: Aqif Haxhiahmeti; 1887 – 21 January 1945), known as Aćif Bljuta (Albanian: Aqif Blyta, Serbian Cyrillic: Аћиф Бљута), was an Albanian collaborationist politician in the Sanjak of Novi Pazar region of the Kingdom of Yugoslavia in the interwar period and during World War II.

In the interwar period he was mayor of Novi Pazar and a deputy of Džemijet following the 1923 elections. After the Axis invasion of Yugoslavia in April 1941, he was appointed mayor of Novi Pazar under the German military government of the Territory of the Military Commander in Serbia and in 1943–44 was a deputy of Mitrovica in the Albanian parliament.

He was also a member of the central committee of the Second League of Prizren. Towards the end of the war, he was executed by the Yugoslav Partisans for his collaboration with the Axis for massive war crimes against Serbs and killings of Albanians who were against his rule.

== Origin and early life ==
Aćif Hadžiahmetović was born in 1887 in Novi Pazar (at the time part of the Sanjak of Novi Pazar, now Serbia), to father Emin-aga and mother Jalduza. He was ethnic Albanian, and his family hailed from the area of Gjakova. The patronymic Hadžiahmetović was adopted by him to honour his grandfather, Ahmet, who completed hajj. He kept his paternal surname Bluta, which he especially highlighted since the 1941 occupation, to define himself as Albanian towards the Nazi German rule. He spoke Turkish, Albanian, and Serbian.

He completed a lower gymnasium at Novi Pazar, after which he worked for a time as a municipality registrar in Vushtrri. He then completed the Military Academy in Bitola. He moved to Turkey in 1913. As an officer with the rank of captain, he fought in the Balkan Wars and received the German Iron Cross, 2nd Class for courage.

Aqif Blyta belonged to the Thaçi Tribe (Fis)

Aćif and his wife Mahije had no children of their own but had adopted two orphans from Gjakova, Qamil and Mejreme.

== Biography ==
A member of Džemijet since its foundation in 1919, he was elected mayor of Novi Pazar in 1920. In 1923 he was elected as a representative of the region in the parliament of the Kingdom of Serbs, Croats and Slovenes. A close collaborator of the party's leader Ferhat Draga, his speeches in the parliament focused on the agrarian reform, which he often attacked as a policy that targeted only Albanian farmers. During late 1924 and early 1925, Hadžiahmetović was arrested four times under unclear charges and spent the 1925 elections in jail. After Ferhat Draga's imprisonment and the party's dissolution, many of its members faced attacks. Hadžiahmetović himself survived two assassination attempts.

=== During World War II ===
Hadžiahmetović organized ceremonial welcome and an official banquet in Novi Pazar for German occupying forces on 16 April 1941. In April 1941 German Nazi forces appointed Hadžiahmetović as mayor of Novi Pazar. He established a governing committee in Novi Pazar of 11 members, all Albanians, and also established a Muslim gendarmerie which was pro-Albanian and whose members wore Albanian symbols. His administration violently fired previous local government, many of whom were forced to leave the city. Hadžiahmetović's brother-in-law Ahmet Daca was appointed as County chief. Deževa County was given to occupied Serbia, however Hadžiahmetović and his associates sought a de facto inclusion of Deževa County occupied Albania through their strong ties with Tutin. His governance saw a return of feudal relations in the region, which was agreed with Milan Aćimović, head of Commissioner Government on July 19. He was one of the signatories of the Resolution of Sarajevo Muslims in 1941. During that year, his forces began to conduct war crimes against local Serb civilians and started killings of Albanians who were opposed of his rule. At the same time, with officers like Shaban Polluzha under his command, who was responsible for killing of 150 Serbian civilians in Ibarski Kolašin in September 1941, he organized the defense of the region against attacks by Chetnik forces that targeted Albanian and Muslim civilians and by the Yugoslav Partisans who led the antifascist liberation movement. On October 21, 1941, Hadžiahmetović's troops razed Christian houses in Vojniće and in retaliation, Chetniks razed Muslim houses in the same village. On November 4, Chetnik forces attacked Novi Pazar for the first time, which was repelled by end of the day. Following their victory in the subsequent battle, the Serbs in the city became victims of violence. Between 4 and 15 November, 67 Christians were killed in the city and near-by villages. Hadžiahmetović's administration did not officially condone killing of Serbs, however it did nothing about it either. Between 5–9 November, Hadžiahmetović's troops burnt down and robbed Christian houses in seven villages and Chetniks followed suit with reprisals to Muslim houses in two villages. On November 16, Hadžiahmetović's troops began a counter-offensive towards Raška and easily pushed out Chetnik troops, coming in the vicinity of Raška within a day. After the town was captured, tens of Christian villages were robbed and razed by the attacking forces. The Chetniks reorganized and on November 17, managed to push back Hadžiahmetović's forces to Novi Pazar.

One of the policies that created the greatest revolt among the local Bosniak population was the prohibition of wearing the Muslim hat, fez. Hadžiahmetović used persecution of Serbs in his region of control to buy their property for very cheap prices, with the payments being done in Novi Pazar, where many did not dare to come. This was done in the name of an Albanian bank, but also for increasing his personal wealth. During a public speech made when the first Albanian military forces penetrated into Novi Pazar in October 1941, Hadžiahmetović warned the public present that they are "Albanian, and not Bosniak", and stated: "Behind us stand three million Albanians, our Pazar is the centre of Albania, and we will create a Greater Albania.". At another public speech, Hadžiahmetović is recorded to have said that the population which occupies all lands spanning from Raška (a town in southern Serbia) to the southernmost point of Albania is Albanian.

It was also during his rule, in 1942, that the entire Jewish population of Novi Pazar – 221 individuals, were imprisoned by German forces, sent to the concentration camp Staro Sajmište and killed.

In 1943 he joined the Second League of Prizren and was elected a member of its central committee. A few months later, after the incorporation of Mitrovica into Albania he became a representative of the region in the Albanian parliament along with Ferhat Abidi, Hysen Hysnija and Shaban Mustafa. Hadžiahmetović organized a conference to promote recruitment for the SS Handschar in Novi Pazar. One of the speakers at the conference was Xhafer Deva, head of the administration in Mitrovica in 1943. In September 1943, Albanian collaborationist forces organized an action against the remaining Serb population in the Draževa srez. 15 Serb villages were burnt down during the action and at least 18 were killed. German police agents noted that Hadžiahmetović was 'hiding the extent of the crimes against Serbs, refusing to persecute the perpetrators and shielding them from justice'.

He was considered a collaborator with the Axis powers during World War II and was executed in 1945 by the Yugoslav government, after he was found guilty of the murder of nearly 7,000 Serbs.

== Legacy ==
In the late 2000s the Bosniak National Council initiated the process of his historical rehabilitation in Serbia. Among others Muamer Zukorlić has praised him as a "hero of Bosniak people". The campaign culminated in the inauguration of a memorial dedicated to Hadžiahmetović on August 3, 2012, in Novi Pazar. This event was attended by Sulejman Ugljanin (Minister Without Portfolio of Serbia), Esad Džudžević (president of the Bosniak National Council) and Ahmedin Škrijelj (deputy mayor of Novi Pazar). The Ministry of Justice and State Administration of Serbia instructed the local administration to remove the memorial. There is also an initiative to name the City Stadium of Novi Pazar after him.

Opponents of the rehabilitation of Aćif Hadžiahmetović emphasize that he fought for Greater Albania project, that his aim was to Albanize the Bosniak population of Sandžak, that he collaborated with occupying forces of the Third Reich in the whole period of occupation during World War II, sent a number of communists from Novi Pazar into concentration camps, as well as allowed the elimination of Serbian, Jewish and Roma population of Novi Pazar. For his collaboration he was awarded with Iron Cross by Nazi Germany.

== Sources ==
- Dželetović, Pavle (15 September 2012). "Aćif Bljuta vođa krvavog talasa". Novosti. (in Serbo-Croatian)
- Maliković, Milija K. (1971). Raška i okolina (in Serbian). Istorijski arhiv. pp. 81, 83, 93.
- Živković, Milutin (2012). "Aćif Hadžiahmetović Bljuta: prilozi za biografiju 1919–1941" (PDF). Istorija 20. Veka (in Serbian). XXX (3). Belgrade: ISI: 71–94. doi:10.29362/ist20veka.2012.3.ziv.71-94. Archived from the original (PDF) on 2016-10-20.
- Živković, Milutin (2017). Санџак 1941-1943 [Sanžak 1941-1943] (in Serbo-Croatian). Belgrade: University of Belgrade.
