= Agios Georgios, Grevena =

Agios Georgios Άγιος Γεώργιος
- Community
- Location within Greece
- Coordinates: 40°11.8′N 21°24.5′E
- Country: Greece
- Administrative region: Western Macedonia
- Regional unit: Grevena
- Municipality: Grevena
- Municipal unit: Irakleotes

Area
  - Community: 23.129 km^{2} (8.930 sq mi)
- Elevation: 800 m (2,600 ft)

Population (2021)
  - Community: 324
  - Density: 14.0/km^{2} (36.3/sq mi)
- Time zone: UTC+2 (EET)
  - Summer (DST): UTC+3 (EEST)
- Postal code: 510 30
- Area code: +30-2462
- Vehicle registration: PN

Agios Georgios (Greek: Άγιος Γεώργιος, before 1927: Τσούρχλι – Tsourchli) is a village and a community of the Grevena municipality. Before the 2011 local government reform it was a part of the municipality of Irakleotes, of which it was a municipal district and the seat. The 2021 census recorded 324 residents in the village. The community of Agios Georgios covers an area of 23.129 km^{2}.

== Demographics ==
According to the statistics of Vasil Kanchov ("Macedonia, Ethnography and Statistics"), 200 Greek Christians, 400 Greek Muslims and 40 Romani lived in the village in 1900.

Tsourchli was a mixed village and a part of its population were Greek speaking Muslim Vallahades. The 1920 Greek census recorded 919 people in the village, and 400 inhabitants (90 families) were Muslim in 1923. Following the Greek–Turkish population exchange, Greek refugee families in Tsourchli were from Asia Minor (15) and Pontus (111) in 1926. The 1928 Greek census recorded 785 village inhabitants. In 1928, the refugee families numbered 124 (413 people).

== Notable people ==
- New Martyr Saint George 1808-1838

Bekir Fikri (1882–1914), Ottoman military officer

== See also ==
- List of settlements in the Grevena regional unit
