= Young Turk Revolution =

1908 restoration of constitutional rule in the Ottoman Empire

- Part of the collapse of the Ottoman Empire
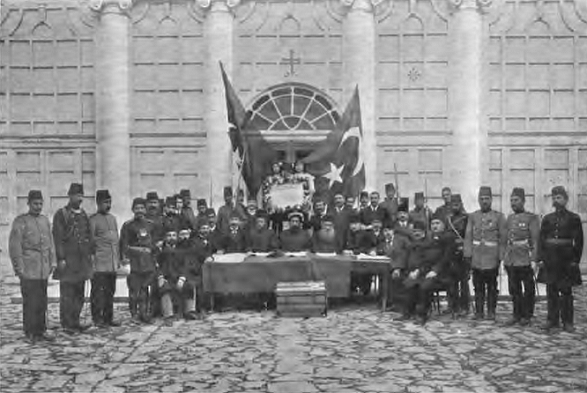
- Declaration of the Young Turk Revolution by the leaders of the Ottoman millets in 1908
Date	3–24 July 1908
Location	Ottoman Empire
Result	Young Turks victory; Second Constitutional Era begins; Repromulgation of the Constitution; Reinstatement of the Parliament; General elections are called; Bulgaria declares independence; Bosnian Crisis begins

Belligerents
Committee of Union and Progress	(Ottoman Empire) Ottoman Imperial Government

Commanders and leaders
Ahmed Niyazi; Ismail Enver; Eyub Sabri; Mehmed Talât; Bekir Fikri; Salahaddin Bey; Hasan Bey	Abdul Hamid II (surrendered) (Ottoman Empire) Mehmed Ferid Pasha (Ottoman Empire) Shemsi Pasha X (Ottoman Empire) Tatar Osman Pasha (POW)

The Young Turk Revolution (July 1908; Turkish: Jön Türk Devrimi) was a constitutionalist revolution in the Ottoman Empire. Revolutionaries belonging to the Internal Committee of Union and Progress (CUP), an organization of the Young Turks movement, forced Sultan Abdul Hamid II to restore the Constitution, recall the parliament, and schedule an election. Thus began the Second Constitutional Era which lasted from 1908–1912 and also the Turkish Revolution, an era of political instability and social change which lasted for more than four decades.

The revolution took place in Ottoman Rumeli in the context of the Macedonian Struggle and the increasing instability of the Hamidian regime. It began with CUP member Ahmed Niyazi's flight into the Albanian highlands. He was soon joined by İsmail Enver, Eyub Sabri, and other Unionist officers. They networked with local Albanians and utilized their connections within the Salonica based Third Army to instigate a large revolt. A string of assassinations by Unionist Fedai also contributed to Abdul Hamid's capitulation. Though the constitutional regime established after the revolution eventually succumbed to Unionist dictatorship by 1913, the Ottoman sultanate ceased to be the base of power in Turkey after 1908.

Immediately after the revolution, Bulgaria declared independence from the Ottoman Empire and Austria-Hungary's annexation of nominal Ottoman territory sparked the Bosnian Crisis.

After an attempted monarchist uprising known as the 31 March incident in favor of Abdul Hamid the following year, he was deposed and his half-brother Mehmed V ascended the throne.

== Background ==
Sultan Abdul Hamid II was brought to the throne in August 1876 after a series of palace coups by constitutionalist ministers overthrew first his uncle Abdul Aziz, and then his half-brother Murad V. Under duress, he promulgated a constitution and held elections for a parliament. However, with the unsuccessful war with Russia which ended in 1878, he suspended enforcement of the constitution and prorogued parliament. After further consolidating his rule by purging the Young Ottomans he governed as an absolutist monarch for the next three decades. This left a very small group of individuals able to partake in politics in the Ottoman Empire.

Countering the conservative politics of Abdul Hamid II's reign was the amount of social reform that occurred during this time period. The development of educational institutions in the Ottoman Empire also established the background for political opposition. Abdul Hamid's political circle was close-knit and ever-changing.

== Rise of the opposition ==
The origins of the revolution lie within the Young Turk movement, an opposition movement which wished to see Abdul Hamid II's authoritarian regime dismantled, and saw themselves as successors of the Young Ottomans. Being imperialists, they believed Abdul Hamid was an illegitimate sultan for giving away territories in the Berlin Treaty and for not being confrontational enough to the Great Powers. In addition to a return to rule of law instead of royal arbitrary rule, they believed that a constitution would negate any motivation for non-Muslim subjects to join nationalist separatist organizations, and therefore negate any justification by the Great Powers to intervene in the Empire. Most of the Young Turks were exiled intelligentsia, however by 1906–1908 many officers and bureaucrats in the Balkans were inducted into the Committee of Union and Progress, the preeminent Young Turk organization.

While the Young Turks were in consensus that some reform was necessary for Ottomanism, the idea of national unity among the ethnic groups of the Ottoman Empire, they disagreed how far reform should go. The anti-Hamidians in the Ottoman Empire that joined the CUP were conservative liberal, imperialist, technocratists. To what extent they could have achieved praxis was dubious, as Ahmet Rıza, the exiled CUP leader, initially denounced revolution. Some Young Turks wished for a federation of nations under an Ottoman monarch, as exemplified in Prince Sabahaddin's movement, though after his failed coup attempt in 1903 his faction was discredited.

== Causes ==
=== Grievances by oppressed minorities ===
The struggles of oppressed nationalities within the Ottoman Empire also contributed significantly to the movement led by the Young Turks. These included Armenian, Macedonian, Bulgarian, and Albanian struggles against Hamidian rule.

The Armenian Revolutionary Federation (ARF) was one of the most important revolutionary organizations opposing Abdul Hamid II, and its alliance with Young Turk factions helped transform unrest in eastern Anatolia into a constitutional political movement. The cooperation was operational as well as political: in Van in 1907, Unionist and ARF fedais jointly resisted government troops and coordinated a threat against the governor, while practical cooperation also occurred in Erzurum. Turkish and Armenian revolutionaries jointly challenged provincial authority and helped formulate a common programme encompassing strikes, tax resistance, military propaganda, armed resistance, and general insurrection. By organizing Armenian peasants around land repossession and resistance, the ARF inserted the material grievances of an oppressed population into constitutional politics and encouraged the Committee of Union and Progress (CUP) to pursue a broader uprising.

=== Economic issues ===
By the 20th century, the Hamidian system seemed bankrupt. Crop failures caused a famine in 1905, and wage hikes could not keep up with inflation. This led to civil unrest in Eastern Anatolia, which the CUP and the Armenian nationalist Dashnak Committee took advantage of. In December 1907 the government put down the Erzurum Revolt. Constitutionalist revolutions occurred in neighbors of the Ottoman Empire, in Russia in 1905, and in Persia the next year. In 1908, workers began to strike in the capital, which kept the authorities on edge. There were also rumors that the Sultan was in poor health on the eve of the revolution.

=== Situation in Ottoman Macedonia ===
Starting in the 1890s, chronic intercommunal violence took hold of Ottoman Macedonia in what came known as the Macedonian struggle, as well as in Eastern Anatolia. The Ottoman military based in Macedonia resented the anarchy which it found itself in: sectarian militias not only skirmished with the army but among themselves to achieve the most influence among the provincial Orthodox population which hadn't yet strongly identified with either Greece or Bulgaria. Muslim Macedonians would get caught up in the violence, bearing the brunt of attacks like the Bulgarian nationalist Internal Macedonian Revolutionary Organization (IMRO) or Greek Nationalist Macedonian Committee, compelling Muslim Turks and Albanians to form militias of their own. Terrorist attacks by national liberation groups were regular occurrences. In response to the Ilinden Uprising of 1903, the Ottoman Empire capitulated to international pressure to implement reforms in Macedonia, known as the Mürzsteg program, under Great Power supervision, offending Muslims living in Macedonia and especially army officers. In 1905, another intervention by the Great Powers for reform in Macedonia was greeted with dread amongst the Muslim population.

Throughout this period, the Ottoman Empire's weak economy and Abdul Hamid's distrust of the military meant the army was in constant pay arrears. The Sultan was weary of having the army train with live ammunition anyway, lest an uprising against the order occurred. This sentiment especially applied to the Ottoman navy; once the third largest fleet in 19th century Europe, it was rotting away locked inside the Golden Horn.

The defense of their empire was a matter of great honor within the Ottoman military, but the terrible conditions of their service deeply affected morale for the worse. Senior alaylı officers, temperamentally conservative and some of them illiterate, distrusted Mektebli officers, upstart graduates of the modern military schools, resulting in promotions becoming increasingly bottlenecked. Those stationed in Macedonia were outraged against the sultan, and believed the only way to save Ottoman presence in the region to join revolutionary secret societies. Many Unionist officers of the Third Army based in Salonika were motivated by the fear of a partition of Ottoman Macedonia. A desire to preserve the state, not destroy it, motivated the revolutionaries.

== Preparation for the revolution ==
Following the 1902 Congress of Ottoman Opposition, Ahmed Rıza's Unionists abandoned political evolution and formed a coalition with the Activists, which were political revolutionaries. With the fall of Prince Sabahaddin, Rıza's coalition was once again the leading Young Turk current. In 1907 a new anti-Hamidian secret society was founded in Salonica known as the Ottoman Freedom Committee, founded by figures which achieved prominence post-revolution: Mehmed Talaat, Bahaeddin Şakir, and Doctor Nazım. Following its merger with the CUP, the former became the Internal Headquarters of the CUP, while Rıza's Paris branch became the External Headquarters of the CUP.

In the CUP's December 1907 Congress, Rıza, Sabahaddin, and Khachatur Malumian of the Dashnak Committee pledged to overthrow the regime by all means necessary. In practice, this was a tactile alliance between the CUP and Dashnaks which was unpopular in both camps, and the Dashnaks did not play a significant role in the coming revolution.

In the lead up to the revolution the CUP courted the many ethnic committee of the volatile melting pot that was Macedonia. With the conclusion of the IMRO's left-wing congress in May–June 1908, the CUP reached a deal for the left's support and neutrality from their right, but the Macedonian-Bulgarian committee's disunity and their late decision also meant no joint operations between the two groups during the revolution. The Unionists did not seriously court the Serbian Chetniks, but did reach out to the Greek bands for support. Using more sticks than carrots, the CUP walked away with a tenuous declaration of neutrality from the Greeks. The most resources were invested in attaining Albanian support. Albanian feudal lords and notables enjoyed CUP patronage. While the Unionists were less successful in recruiting bourgeois nationalists to their cause they did cultivate a relationship with the Bashkimi Society. The CUP always held a close relationship with the non-Muslim groups of the Vlachs, their Christianity being an important propaganda asset, and the Jews.

According to Ismail Enver the CUP set the date for their revolution to be sometime in August 1908, though a spontaneous one happened before August anyway.

== Revolution ==
Flag of the Young Turks: Adalet, İttihat, Uhuvvet, Müsavat, Hürriyet, meaning "Justice, Unity, Brotherhood, Equality, Freedom"

The event that triggered the revolution was a meeting in the Baltic port of Reval between Edward VII of the United Kingdom and Nicholas II of Russia on 9–12 June 1908. While "the Great Game", had created a rivalry between the two powers, a resolution to their relationship was sought after. The Anglo-Russian Convention of 1907 brought shaky British-Russian relations to the forefront by solidifying boundaries that identified their respective control in Persia (eastern border of the Empire) and Afghanistan. It was rumored that in this latest meeting another reform package would be imposed on the Ottoman Empire which would formally partition Macedonia.

With the newspaper reports of the meeting, the CUP's Monastir (Bitola) branch decided to act. A memorandum was drawn up by Unionists that was distributed to the European consuls which rejected foreign intervention and nationalist activism. They also called for constitutional government and equality amongst Ottoman citizens.

With no action taken by the Great Powers or the government, the revolt began in earnest in the first week of July 1908. On 3 July Major Ahmed Niyazi began the revolution by raiding the Resne (Resen) garrison cache of money, arms, and ammunition and assembled a force of 160 volunteers to the mountains surrounding the city. From there he visited many villages around the predominantly Muslim Albanian area to recruit for his band and warn of impending European intervention and Christian supremacy in Macedonia. Niyazi would highlight the government's (not the sultan) weakness and corruption as the reason for this crisis, and that a constitutional framework would deliver the systematic reform necessary to negate Western intervention. Niyazi's Muslim Albanian heritage worked to his advantage in this propaganda campaign which also involved settling clan rivalries. When touring Christian Bulgarian and Serbian villages, he highlighted that the constitution would bring about equality between Christians and Muslims, and was able to recruit Bulgarians into his force.

Other Unionists, following Niyazi's example, took to the mountains of Macedonia: Ismail Enver Bey in Tikveş, Eyub Sabri in Ohri (Ohrid), Bekir Fikri in Grebene (Grevena), and Salahaddin Bey and Hasan Bey in Kırçova (Kičevo). In each post office the rebels came across, they transmitted their demands to the government in Constantinople (Istanbul): reinstate the constitution and reconvene the parliament otherwise the rebels would march on the capital.

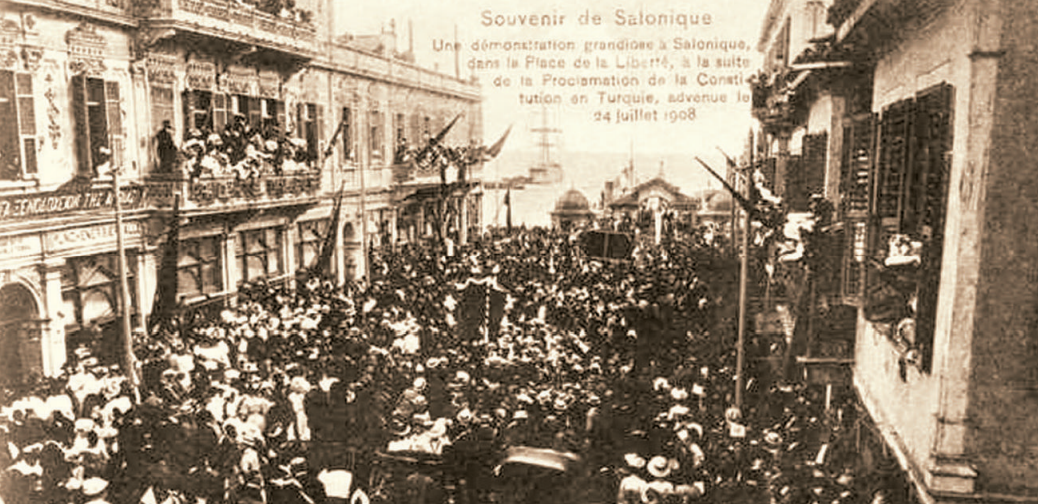
Proclamation of the Constitution in Eleftherias Square, Salonica

On 7 July, Şemsi Pasha arrived at Monastir. Abdul Hamid II dispatched him from Mitroviçe (Mitrovica) with two battalions to suppress the revolt in Macedonia. An ethnic Albanian, he also recruited a pro-government band of Albanians on the way. He informed the palace of his arrival in the city at the local telegraph station, and as he walked out of the building he was assassinated by a Unionist fedai, Âtıf Kamçıl. His Albanian bodyguards and the pasha's aide de camp, who was his son, were also CUP members. Tatar Osman Pasha, Şemsi's replacement, was captured soon after. On 22 July, Monastir fell to the rebels, and Niyazi proclaimed the constitution to the citizens. That day Grand Vizier Mehmed Ferid Pasha was sacked for Said Pasha.

Coincidentally, Albanians of Ferizaj, having mobilized massive demonstrations against the opening of a new Austrian-German school in early July, by now pledged their support to the CUP's revolution; Abdul Hamid therefore lost support of the Albanians (see Ferizaj assembly). Elsewhere, Hayri Pasha, field marshal of the Third Army, was threatened by the committee into a passive cooperation. At this point, the mutiny which originated in the Third Army in Salonica took hold of the Second Army based in Adrianople (Edirne) as well as Anatolian troops sent from Smyrna (Izmir).

The rapid momentum of the Unionist's organization, intrigues within the military, discontent with Abdul Hamid's autocratic rule, and a desire for the Constitution meant the sultan and his ministers were compelled to capitulate. Over the course of a three day meeting with his Council of Ministers, a unanimous decision was reached to reinstate the constitution. Under pressure of being deposed, on the night of 23–24 July 1908, Abdul Hamid II issued the İrade-i Hürriyet, reinstating the Constitution and calling an election to great jubilation.

Celebrations were held intercommunally, as Muslims and Christians attended celebrations together in both churches and mosques. Parades were held throughout the Empire, with attendants shouting Egalité! Liberté! Justice! Fraternité! Vive la constitution! and Padişahım çok yaşa! (Long live my emperor). Armed bands of Serbian, Bulgarian, and Greek chetas, one time enemies of each other and the government, took part in celebrations before ceremoniously turning in their firearms to the government. Niyazi, Enver, and the other Unionist revolutionaries were celebrated as "heroes of liberty", and Ahmed Rıza, returning from his exile was declared "father of liberty".

== Aftermath ==
=== Impact on the Second Constitutional Era ===
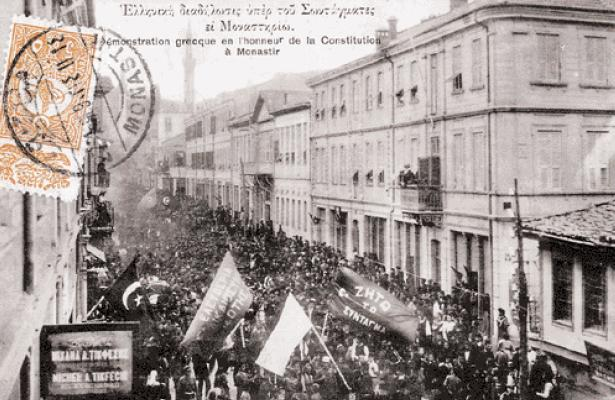
Greek demonstration in Monastir in favour of the constitution

24 July 1908 started the Ottoman Empire's Second Constitution Era. There after, a number of decrees are issued, which defined freedom of speech, press and organizations, the dismantlement of intelligence agencies, and a general amnesty to political prisoners. Importantly, the CUP did not overthrow the government and nominally committed itself to democratic ideals and constitutionalism; however, since the revolution, the Ottoman government began to curtail organized labour and repress of non-Muslim communities, particularly those which were Christian.

The Committee of Union and Progress's post-1908 authoritarian turn has been characterized in scholarship as a betrayal the revolution, particularly through its repression of organized labor,, repression of non-Turkish minorities, and its replacement of genuine constitutionalism with authoritarian party rule, Between the revolution and the 31 March Incident, the CUP's emerged victorious in a power struggle between the palace (Abdul Hamid II) and the liberated Sublime Porte. Until the December election, the CUP dominated the empire in what Şükrü Hanioğlu deemed a Comité de salut public.

Following the revolution, many organizations, some of them previously underground, established political parties. The several political currents expressed amongst the Young Turks lead to disagreements on what liberty meant. Among these the CUP and the Liberty Party and later on Freedom and Accord Party, were the major ones. There were smaller parties such as Ottoman Socialist Party and the Democratic Party. On the other end of the spectrum were the ethnic parties which included the People's Federative Party (Bulgarian Section), the Bulgarian Constitutional Clubs, the Jewish Social Democratic Labour Party in Palestine (Poale Zion), Al-Fatat, and Armenians organized under the Armenakan, the Hunchaks and the Dashnaks.

The 1908 Ottoman general election took place during November and December 1908. Due to its leading role in the revolution, the CUP won almost every seat in the Chamber of Deputies. The large parliamentary group and the then lax laws on party affiliation eventually whittled the delegation into a smaller and more cohesive group of 60 MPs. The Senate of the Ottoman Empire reconvened for the first time in over 30 years on 17 December 1908 with the living members like Hasan Fehmi Pasha from the First Constitutional Era.

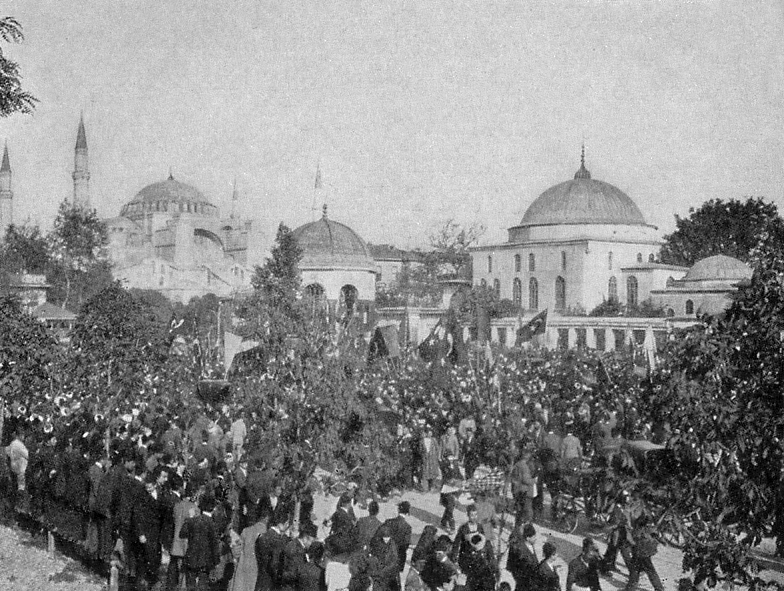
Demonstration in Sultanahmet

While the Young Turk Revolution had promised organizational improvement, once instituted, the government at first proved itself rather disorganized and ineffectual. Although these working-class citizens had little knowledge of how to control a government, they imposed their ideas on the Ottoman Empire. The CUP had Said Pasha removed from the premiership in less than two weeks for Kâmil Pasha. His quest to revive the Sublime Porte of the Tanzimat proved fruitless when CUP soon censored him with a no-confidence vote in parliament, thus he was replaced by Hüseyin Hilmi Pasha who was more in-line with the committee's ways.

Abdul Hamid maintained his throne by conceding its existence as a symbolic position, but in April 1909 attempted to seize power (see 31 March Incident) by stirring populist sentiment throughout the Empire. The Sultan's bid for a return to power gained traction when he promised to restore the caliphate, eliminate secular policies, and restore the Sharia-based legal system. On 13 April 1909, army units revolted, joined by masses of theological students and turbaned clerics shouting, "We want Sharia", and moving to restore the Sultan's absolute power. The CUP once again assembled a force in Macedonia to march on the capital and restored parliamentary rule after crushing the counter-revolution on 24 April 1909. The deposition of Abdul Hamid II in favor of Mehmed V followed, and the palace ceased to be a significant player in Ottoman politics.

=== Impact on Christian communities ===
The Young Turks initially encouraged non-Muslim groups to expect equal citizenship, protection of their national rights and redress of longstanding grievances, but these expectations gave way to disillusionment as the Committee of Union and Progress (CUP) prioritized ethno-religious nationalism over communal demands. The CUP curtailed the autonomy of non-Muslim communities by opposing administrative decentralization, seeking to abolish their ethno-national privileges, imposing Ottoman Turkish in communal schools and restricting the civil liberties through which these groups defended their interests. After the Balkan Wars, the CUP initiated a policy of "national economy" intended to create a Muslim-Turkish bourgeoisie by directing state patronage, commercial opportunities and employment toward Muslims at the expense of established non-Muslim merchants and property owners. Although Ottoman Greeks were initially the principal targets, this policy increasingly discriminated against non-Muslims as a general category through commercial boycotts, picketing, physical intimidation and harassment, pressure against buying from or working for non-Muslim businesses, and demands that Muslim employers hire Muslim workers. The discrimination against Christians under the CUP eventually transpired into genocide.

=== New elites ===
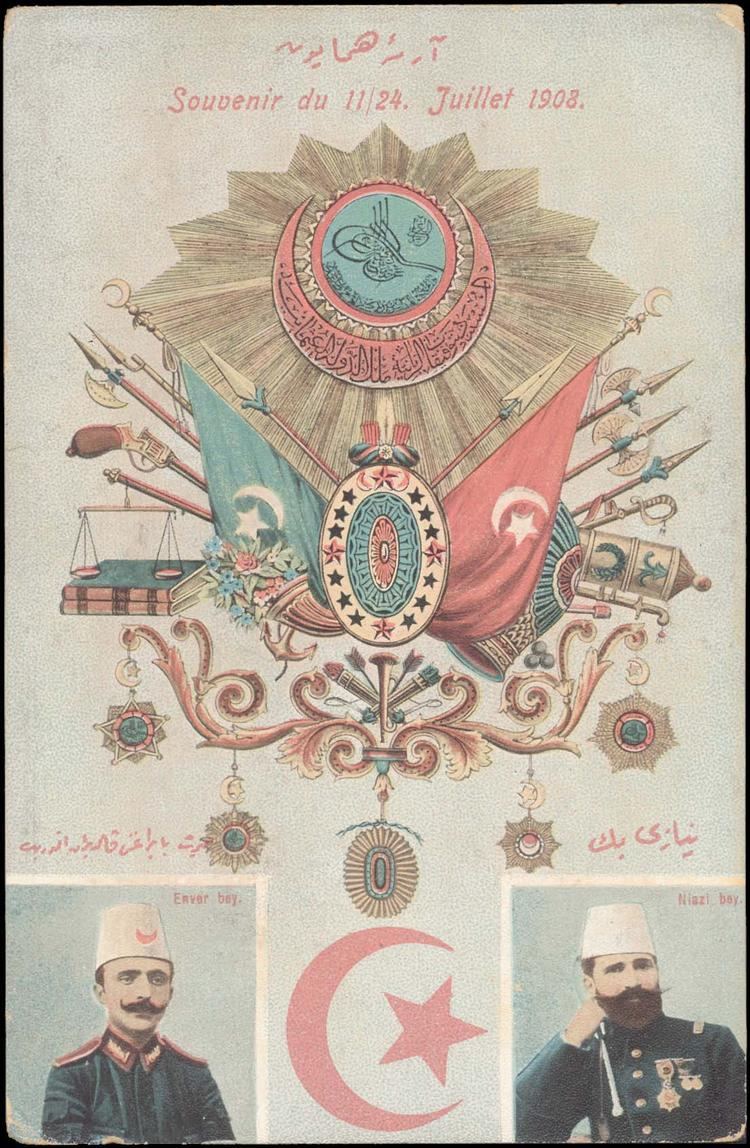
Enver Bey and Niyazi Bey from a postcard in 1908.

These developments caused the gradual creation of a new governing elite. No longer was power exercised by a small governing elite surrounding the Sultan, the Sublime Porte's independence was restored and a new young clique of bureaucrats and officers gradually took control of politics for the CUP. The parliament confirmed through popular sovereignty both old elites as well as new ones. In 1909 a purge in the army demoted many "Old Turks" while elevating "Young Turk" officers.

The post-revolution CUP undertook a consolidation of itself in order to define its ideology. Those intellectual Unionists that spent years in exile, such as Ahmed Rıza, would be sidelined in favor of the new professional organizers, Mehmed Talât, Doctor Nazım, and Bahaeddin Şakir. The organization's home being Rumeli, delegations were sent to local chapters in Asia and Tripolitania to more firmly attach them to the organizations new headquarters in Salonica. The CUP would dominate Ottoman politics for the next ten years, save for brief interruption from 1912 to 1913. 5 of these years would be a dictatorship established in the aftermath of the 1913 coup and Mahmud Shevket Pasha's assassination, during which they drove the empire to fight alongside Germany during World War I and commit genocide against Ottoman Christians.

The revolution also served as a downfall for the non-Muslim elites which benefited from the Hamidian system. The Dashnaks, previously leading a guerilla resistance in the Eastern Anatolian countryside, became the main representatives of Armenians in the Ottoman Empire, replacing the urban centered pre-1908 Armenian amira class, which had been composed of merchants, artisans, and clerics. The Armenian National Assembly used the moment to oust Patriarch Malachia Ormanian for Matthew II Izmirlian.

The elite Bulgarian community of Istanbul were similarly displaced by a youthful nationalist-intellectual class involved with IMRO, as was the Albanian Hamidian elite. Arab and Albanian elites, which were favored under the Hamidian regime, found many privileges lost under the CUP. The revolution continued to destabilize the subservient Sharifate of Mecca as several claimed the title until November 1908, when the CUP recognized Hussein bin Ali Pasha as Emir. In some communities, such as the Jews (cf. Jews in Islamic Europe and North Africa and Jews in Turkey), reformist groups emulating the Young Turks ousted the conservative ruling elite and replaced them with a new reformist one. Social institutions like notable families and houses of worship lost influence to the burgeoning world of party politics. Political clubs, committees, and parties were now the main actors in politics. Though these non-Turkish nationalists cooperated with the Young Turks against the sultan, they would turn on each other during the Second Constitutional Era over the question of Ottomanism, and ultimately autonomy and separatism.

== Cultural and international impact ==
Memoirs

The memory is so intense that to this day, I cannot think of it unmoved. I think of it as a final embrace of love between the simple peoples of Turkey before they should be led to exterminate each other for the political advantage of foreign powers or their own leaders

— Halide Edip

Two European powers took advantage of the chaos by decreasing Ottoman sovereignty in the Balkans. Bulgaria, de jure an Ottoman vassal but de facto all but formally independent, declared its independence on 5 October. The day after, Austria-Hungary officially annexed Bosnia and Herzegovina which used to be de jure Ottoman territory but de facto occupied by Austria-Hungary. The fall of Abdul Hamid II foiled the rapprochement between Serbia and Montenegro and the Ottoman Empire which set the stage for their alliance with Bulgaria and Greece in the Balkan Wars.

Following the revolution a new found faith in Ottomanism was found in the various millets. Violence in Macedonia ceased as rebels turned in their arms and celebrated with citizens. An area from Scutari to Basra was now acquainted with political parties, nationalist clubs, elections, constitutional rights, and civil rights.

The revolution and CUP's work greatly impacted Muslims in other countries. The Persian community in Istanbul founded the Iranian Union and Progress Committee. The leaders of the Young Bukhara movement were deeply influenced by the Young Turk Revolution and saw it as an example to emulate. Indian Muslims imitated the CUP oath administered to recruits of the organization. Discontent in the Greek military saw a secret revolutionary organization explicitly modeled from the CUP which overthrew the government in the Goudi Coup, bringing Eleftherios Venizelos to power.

== In popular culture ==
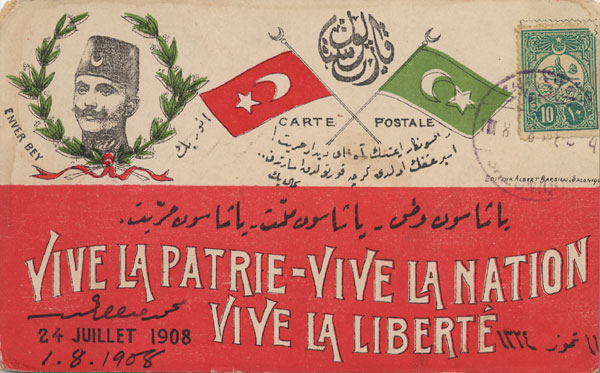
Postcard for the new constitution in Ottoman Turkish and French

The Young Turks is a news commentary show named after the historical movement and live streamed since 2002 on social media platforms, such as YouTube and Twitch.

In the 2010 alternate history novel Behemoth by Scott Westerfeld, the Young Turk Revolution in 1908 fails, igniting a new revolution at the start of World War I.

=== Historiography ===
Historian Ronald Grigor Suny states that the revolution had no popular support and was actually "a coup d'état by a small group of military officers and civilian activists in the Balkans". Hanioğlu states the revolution a watershed moment in the late Ottoman Empire but it was not a popular constitutional movement.

== See also ==
- Bosnian Crisis

== Bibliography ==
- Bedross Der Matossian (2014). Shattered Dreams of Revolution: From Liberty to Violence in the Late Ottoman Empire. Stanford University Press. ISBN 978-0-8047-9263-9.
- Benbassa, Esther (1990), Un grand rabbin sepharde en politique, 1892-1923 [A great sephardic Rabbi in politics, 1892–1923] (in French), Paris, pp. 27–28.
- Erickson, Edward (2013). Ottomans and Armenians: A Study in Counterinsurgency. Palgrave Macmillan. ISBN 978-1137362209.
- Lévy-Aksu, Noémi; Georgeon, François (2017). The Young Turk Revolution and the Ottoman Empire: The Aftermath of 1908. Bloomsbury Publishing.
- Hanioğlu, M. Şükrü (1995), The Young Turks in Opposition, Oxford University Press, ISBN 0-19-509115-9
- Hanioğlu, M Şükrü (2001), Preparation for a Revolution: The Young Turks, 1902–1908, Oxford University Press, ISBN 0-19-513463-X.
- Kieser, Hans-Lukas (26 June 2018), Talaat Pasha: Father of Modern Turkey, Architect of Genocide, Princeton University Press (published 2018), ISBN 978-0-691-15762-7
- Kinross, Lord (1977). The Ottoman Centuries: The Rise and Fall of the Turkish Empire. New York: William Morrow and Company, Inc.
- McMeekin, Sean (2016), The Ottoman Endgame: war, revolution, and the making of the modern Middle East, 1908–1923, New York, New York: Penguin Random House, ISBN 9781594205323
- Rakovsky, Christian (August 1908). The Turkish Revolution.
- Unal, Hasan (1998). "Ottoman policy during the Bulgarian independence crisis, 1908–9: Ottoman Empire and Bulgaria at the outset of the Young Turk revolution". Middle Eastern Studies. 34 (4): 135–176. doi:10.1080/00263209808701247. hdl:11693/51943.
- Zürcher, Erik Jan (2019). "Young Turk Governance in the Ottoman Empire during the First World War". Middle Eastern Studies. 55 (6): 897–913. doi:10.1080/00263206.2019.1590820. S2CID 150573160.
- Zürcher, Erik Jan (2019). "The Young Turk revolution: comparisons and connections". Middle Eastern Studies. 55 (4): 481–498. doi:10.1080/00263206.2019.1566124. S2CID 151308653.
