= Atıf Kamçıl =

Turkish statesperson (1880–1947)

Atıf Kamçıl Bey
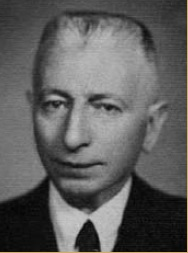
- Born: 1880; Istanbul, Ottoman Empire (present-day Turkey)
- Died: 21 January 1947 (aged 66–67); Istanbul, Turkey
- Citizenship: Ottoman, Turkish
- Occupations: First Lieutenant (Mülâzım-ı Evvel), politician

Atıf Kamçıl, also known as Atif Bey, Atif Efendi (1880–1947) was an Ottoman revolutionary and Turkish politician.

== Biography ==
=== Young Turk Revolution and assassination of Shemsi Pasha ===
On 3 July 1908 Adjutant Major Ahmed Niyazi Bey deserted the Ottoman army fled into the mountains with a guerilla band and initiated the Young Turk Revolution calling for the restoration of the constitution of 1876. By 7 July, General Shemsi Pasha with one unit of volunteers and two army battalions reached Monastir (modern Bitola) by train and was tasked by Ottoman authorities to end the Young Turk (CUP) rebellion. Shemsi and his military forces were viewed as a threat by the CUP Monastir branch and took the decision to assassinate Shemsi before he would begin his military campaign. First Lieutenant Atıf Kamçıl, a CUP revolutionary and member of the self-sacrificing volunteer division of the CUP Monastir branch wrote later in life that he alone decided to assassinate Shemsi. Kamçıl stated he asked the CUP Monastir branch for a gun and had talks about the matter with Süleyman Askerî, the branch's guide. The director of the CUP Monastir branch, Lieutenant Colonel Sadik Bey (Șehreküștü) stated that it was only himself who gave the fatwa (order) for killing Shemsi. In a telegram by the CUP Monastir branch they wrote that a "self-sacrificing" volunteer himself wanted to undertake the task.

During his stopover in Monastir Shemsi telegraphed the palace regarding military operations. As he left the telegraph office and went to enter the carriage Shemsi was assassinated in front of his Albanian bodyguards on July 7 by Atıf Kamçıl. Kamçıl, as he fled from the location was wounded in the leg and later hid in the home of Lieutenant Mahmut Soydun. The Albanian bodyguards of Shemsi had been swayed by the CUP to their side that during the incident they only shot their firearms into the air, did not chase after Kamçıl and later fled from the scene themselves.

For the revolution the murder of Shemsi was a turning point that demoralised the palace and it removed a dangerous opponent for the CUP that could have mobilised Albanians in the Balkans against their forces. The CUP gained a major advantage in the conflict as the assassination galvanised people to their cause. Facing a deteriorating situation in the Balkans on July 24 sultan Abdul Hamid II restored the constitution of 1876.

=== Post revolution ===
Following the revolution individuals like Kamçıl involved in assassinations went unpunished by the CUP and instead they were hailed as heroes and given important positions within the state. Kamçıl became a deputy in the Ottoman Parliament representing Siirt and also the first director of the Ottoman State Tobacco Monopoly based in Çankırı.

After the revolution, some rebels were sidelined in favour of more famous ones and CUP founder Ibrahim Temo felt that at times some peoples rights were violated with individuals being underappreciated like Atıf Bey, an important participant in the revolt. Temo paid a publisher based in Vienna to produce 10,000 postcards with the image of Atıf Bey. On postcards Atıf Bey appears in an image alongside Adem Bey and Çerçiz Topulli symbolising the cooperation of different communal groups of people involved in the revolution.

Later with the establishment of the Turkish Republic Kamçıl served in the National Assembly as a deputy representing Çanakkale. At the Hill of Eternal Freedom (Hürriyet-i Ebediye Tepesi) Kamçıl is buried as a hero of the Turkish state.
