= Biševo, Rožaje =

Biševo Бишево
- Village
- Location within Montenegro
- Country: Montenegro
- Municipality: Rožaje

Population (2011)
  - Total: 434
- Time zone: UTC+1 (CET)
  - Summer (DST): UTC+2 (CEST)

Biševo (Serbian Cyrillic: Бишево; Albanian: Bisheva) is a village in the municipality of Rožaje, Montenegro.

== Demographics ==
According to the 2011 census, its population was 434.

Ethnicity in 2011
Ethnicity	Number	Percentage
Bosniaks	385	88.7%
Montenegrins	9	2.1%
Albanians	6	1.4%
other/undeclared	34	7.8%
Total	434	100%

== Notable people ==
- Jakup Kadrović (Jakup Kadria), Albanian commander of the Sandžak Muslim militia
- Shemsi Pasha (general), Ottoman Albanian general.
