= Eyüp Sabri Akgöl =

Turkish politician

Eyüp Sabri Bey
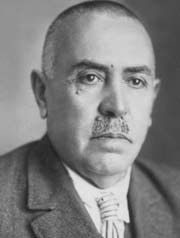
- Eyüp Sabri Akgöl (c. 1930s)
- Born: 1876; Ohri, Ottoman Empire (present-day North Macedonia)
- Died: 16 August 1950; Istanbul, Turkey
- Citizenship: Ottoman, Turkish
- Occupations: Adjutant Major (kolağası), revolutionary, politician
- Movement: Committee of Union and Progress

Eyüp Sabri (Albanian: Ejup Sabriu), Ohrili Eyüp Sabri (1876–1950) known as Eyüp Sabri Akgöl (literally 'white lake') after the 1934 Surname Law, was an Ottoman-Albanian revolutionary and one of the leaders of the Young Turk Revolution (1908).

== Biography ==
Sabri was of Albanian descent and born in Ohri (modern Ohrid), Ottoman Empire in 1876. Ismail Enver Bey recruited Sabri into the Committee of Union and Progress (CUP) movement. Foreigners such as Ernst Jäckh who came into contact with Young Turk (CUP) leaders like Sabri described him as being an Albanian. He was a prominent military leader of the CUP. Adjutant Major Sabri possessed strong authority among fellow Muslims in the area where he resided and could communicate with them as he spoke both Albanian (his mother tongue) and Turkish.

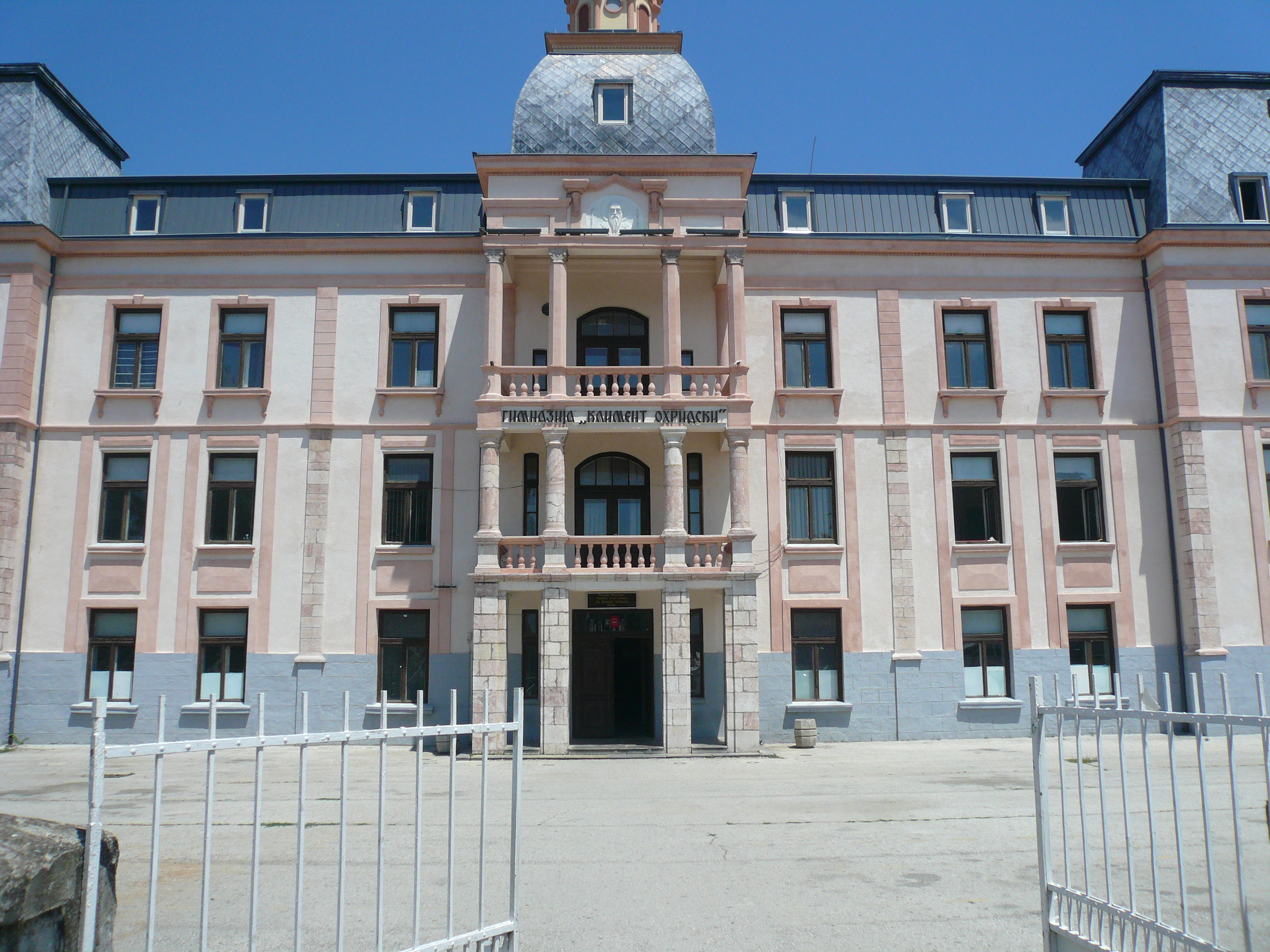
Mejtebot (the Meyteb), a school built by Eyüp Sabri and now used as the St. Kliment Ohrid gymnasium

In Ohri an armed band called the Special Muslim Organisation (SMO) composed of 40 members, mostly notables was created in 1907 to protect local Muslims and fight Internal Macedonian Revolutionary Organization (IMRO) bands. Sabri along with Enver Bey recruited the organisation and turned it into the Ohri branch of the CUP with its band becoming the local CUP band. On July 3, 1908 Ahmed Niyazi Bey protesting the rule of Abdul Hamid II fled with his band from Resne (modern Resen) into the mountains where he initiated the Young Turk Revolution and issued a proclamation that called for the restoration of the constitution of 1876. Following that example other officers like Eyüp Sabri in Ohri and Enver Bey in Tikveş also went into the mountains and formed guerrilla bands (çetes).

During the revolution Subgovernor Sülayman Kâni and Sabri organised the SMO group into the CUP Ohri National Regiment. Under Sabri's command the band went into the mountains. From the outset in July Sabri worked closely with Niyazi. Tatar Osman Pasha, an Ottoman official was kidnapped after the Resne band of Niyazi, the Ohri band of Sabri and two Albanian bands conducted an attack on Monastir (modern Bitola). Toward the end of the revolution CUP Internal headquarters gave orders to the CUP Monastir branch that if the situation persisted a march on Istanbul would commence on 26 July and they in turn told Sabri that his regiment along with Second Lieutenant Mazhar Efendi to leave for the mountains. Facing a deteriorating situation in the Balkans on July 24 sultan Abdul Hamid II restored the constitution. After the revolution Sabri, along with Niyazi and Enver got popular acclaim as Hürriyet Kahramanları (Heroes of Freedom). During the late Ottoman period, Sabri, the town bazaar and donations from the CUP in Istanbul financed the construction of a large school (Mejtebot) in Ohri. The Balkan Wars interrupted its construction and the completed building serves as a gymnasium in modern Ohrid.

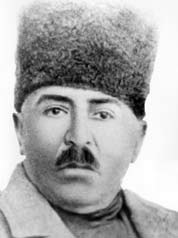
Eyüp Sabri (1920s)

Sabri was a delegate representing Ohri at the Congress of Dibra (1909) organised by the CUP regarding Albanian ethno-linguistic rights and he refused to sign any resolutions due to disagreements with other delegates over its contents. The Ottoman Ministry of Interior in March 1911 sent telegrams to its officials in the Albanian provinces that removed some restrictions on the Albanian alphabet and schools and the CUP tasked Sabri and Haxhi Adil bey as emissaries to keep the populations of Ohri, Starova, Korça and Dibra regions calm. In June 1911 Mehmed V on a stopover in Monastir during his Balkans tour had a scene from the revolution reenacted by Niyazi and Sabri. Both men wore their old clothes, rode horses accompanied by a gun carriage with the event recorded on camera by the Manakis brothers and the film titled Sultan Rešad's Visit to Bitola currently preserved in the Macedonian Archives.

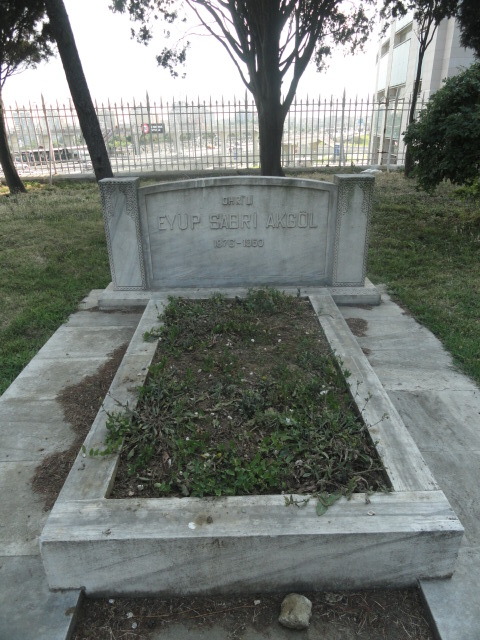
Eyüp Sabri's grave in Şişli

Throughout the Young Turk era, Sabri was a seminal member of the CUP central committee from 1908 to 1918 with his position being renewed by the committee in 1917. He was a fedayi (a militant fighting for the cause). Sabri was a member of the Ottoman Teşkilât-ı Mahsusa (Special Organisation), a group involved in guerrilla warfare. As such the Imperial War Ministry during World War I sent him to the Balkans where he agitated among Albanians with acts of subversion committed in Macedonia and Albania. Those activities later resulted in his imprisonment at Malta by the French, one of the Allied Powers. By 1921 Sabri was a supporter of Enver Pasha and belonged to the group Halk Zümresi. Sabri was involved in the Turkish War of Independence and was a supporter of the Nationalist Movement yet he was marginalised by followers of Mustafa Kemal Atatürk. After the fall of the Turkish Empire and the establishment of the Turkish Republic Sabri was awarded an annual salary for services to the state and served in five Turkish parliaments as a CHP MP for Eskişehir (1), Çorum (5, 6, 7) and Erzurum (8) within the Grand National Assembly of Turkey.
