= Ahmed Niyazi =

Ottoman revolutionary (1873–1913)

Ahmed Niyazi Bey
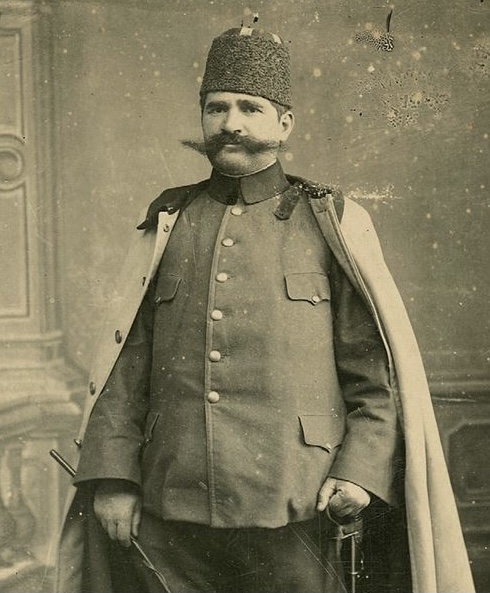
- Born: 1873; Resne, Rumelia Eyalet, Ottoman Empire
- Died: 1913 (aged 39); Vlorë, Independent Albania
- Occupations: Bey, Adjutant Major (kolağası) and revolutionary

Ahmed Niyazi Bey (1873–1913) (Turkish: Resneli Niyazi Bey, Ahmet Niyazi Bey; Albanian: Ahmet Njazi Bej Resnja; "Ahmet Niyazi Bey from Resen") was an Ottoman revolutionary who was the bey of the Resne (now Resen, North Macedonia) area in the late 19th and early 20th centuries. An ethnic Albanian, Niyazi was one of the heroes of the 1908 Young Turk Revolution and of suppressing the 1909 countercoup as he played leading roles in both events. Niyazi is also known for the Saraj, a French-style estate he built in Resne.

== Life ==
=== Early years and education ===
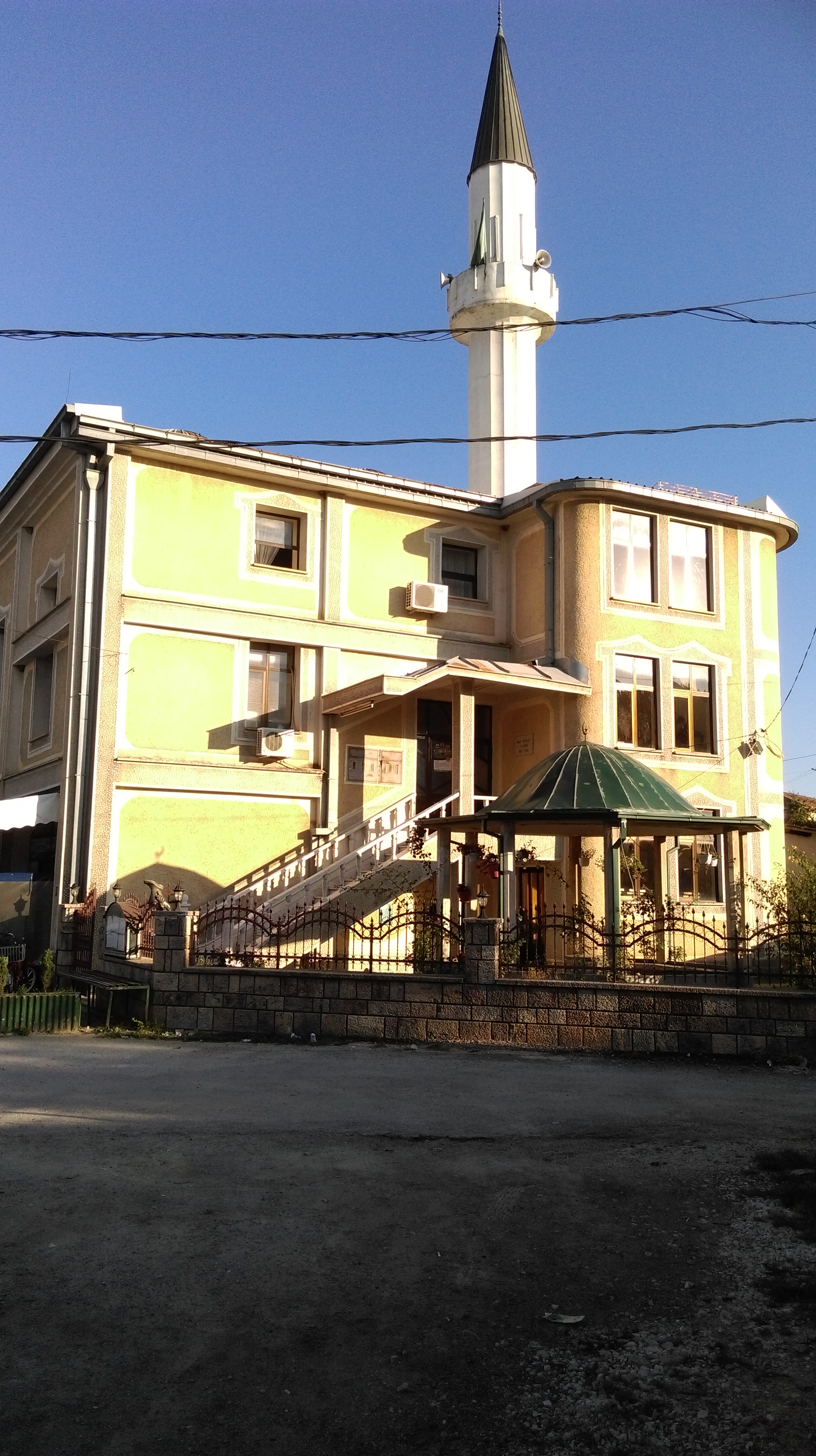
Haji Murat Mosque, Resen

Ahmed Niyazi Bey was born to a Tosk Albanian landowning family from Resne in 1873. His father was Abdullah Aga. Niyazi was educated at the Ottoman Civil Service Academy, and later at the Military High School in Monastir (modern Bitola). Many years later, he stated that he transferred to the Monastir school out of a desire to be taught by some of its instructors, who "[advocated] love for humanity, patria, progress, and society." In his memoirs, Niyazi would recall that as a student in the 1880s he had heard Ottoman and French stories of patriotism, and been strongly influenced by them. He credited these stories, and the teachers who told them, with inculcating ideas of loyalty and love of country in him. He was particularly influenced by the Ottoman writer Namık Kemal; according to Niyazi, Kemal was frequently referred to when they discussed global issues.

After completing his secondary schooling in Monastir, Niyazi studied at the Ottoman War Academy between 1894 and 1897. Like many other students who would eventually rise to hold officer ranks in the army, he received training from the German military, and developed a degree of respect for Germany. While studying in Istanbul, he was again exposed to the writing of Kemal, despite the fact that they were banned because they questioned the authoritarianism of Sultan Abdul Hamid II. Abdul Hamid had dissolved parliament and governed alone. According to Niyazi, Kemal's works inspired him; "an intoxicating patriotism prepared my heart, my innocent heart, for revolutions...", he later wrote. After reading Kemal's work, he told his friends that their education lacked patriotism. In 1896, Niyazi also renovated and upgraded the Haji Murat Mosque of Resne, built in 1612, with the rooms of the ground floor reserved for schooling and the remaining space for prayers.

=== Young Turk membership and early military career ===
During his time training at the Istanbul War Academy, a fellow Ottoman officer Ismail Enver Bey initiated Niyazi into the Committee of Union and Progress (CUP) movement. He became a lieutenant (mülazım) and joined the Ottoman army at a young age in 1896. Niyazi fought with distinction during the Greco-Turkish War (1897), in particular at the Battle of Beşpınar in Epirus, and returned to Istanbul with prisoners of war. Sultan Abdul Hamid II proposed that Niyazi become his aide-de-camp at the palace. Niyazi refused the offer due to the government campaign launched against suppressing the CUP and decided to return home. Among the CUP of his time, Niyazi became disillusioned with exiled opposition figure Murad Bey after he reconciled with the sultan and took a government position following an amnesty for Young Turk members. Niyazi despised the despotism of the sultan and nepotism at the royal court, where ranks and other positions were given at times to people with close social connections.

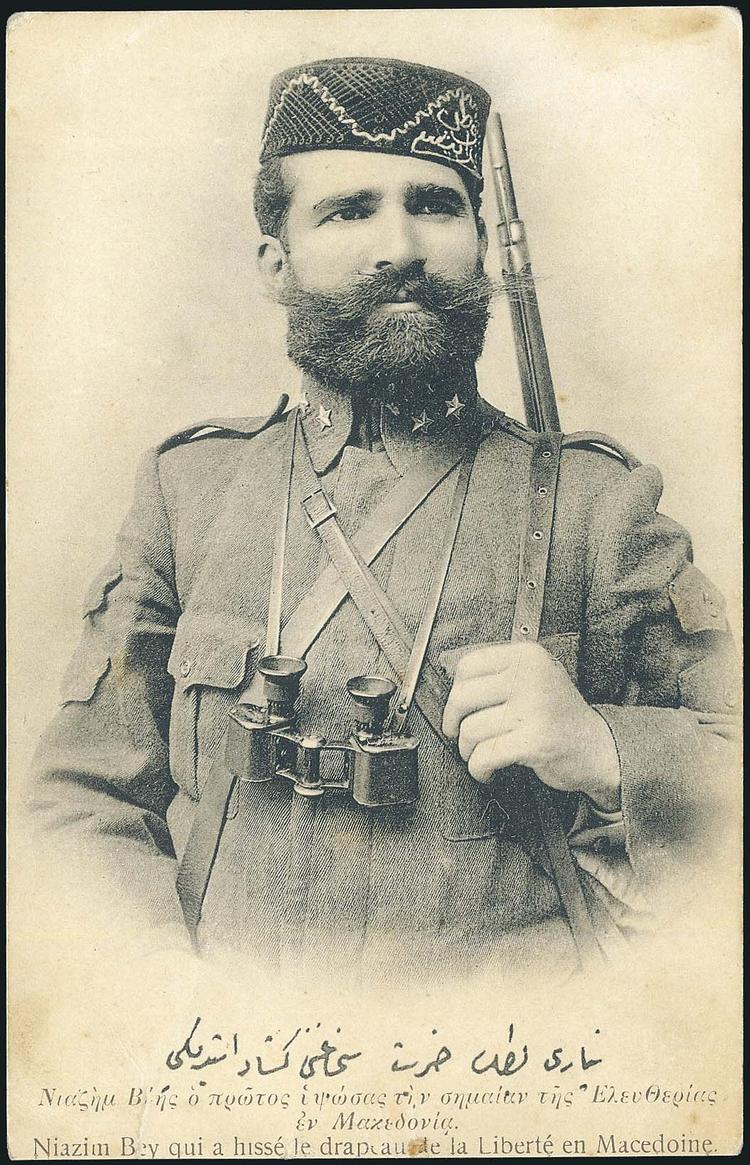
Niyazi Bey in military gear (post 1908)

Between 1899 and 1903 Niyazi was stationed in Ohri as an officer in charge of the ammunition depot in a company of reservists. During his time there he monitored the preparations of the Macedo-Bulgarians for an uprising and noticed how various Russian and Bulgarian missionaries, teachers, officers and advisers contributed to the organisation of this revolt. Through the press and his correspondence with Mecduddin Efendi, a captain based in Izmir, Niyazi followed the activities of the Young Turks within Europe, in particular the decisions and split of the CUP First Congress in Paris (1902). In August 1903, the Internal Macedonian Revolutionary Organisation (IMRO) staged an uprising against the Ottomans in Macedonia and Niyazi was assigned to the third regiment of the Ottoman Third Army. During these events he had an active role in the Monastir branch of the CUP with his status raised to war hero and had gained great notoriety among the Muslim Albanian population of Macedonia. Beginning from 1904 and for five years prior to the revolution he served in an Ottoman chasseur battalion becoming renown for the effective pursuit of bandits in mountainous terrain. Niyazi became committed to the ideas of Ahmet Rıza Bey, a CUP member who advocated for constitutional restoration through revolution and was against foreign intervention in the empire or reforms for a specific community based on preferential treatment.

Military service and a deteriorating security situation in Macedonia affected individuals such as Niyazi who felt that the plight of local Muslims was little known and like other peoples in the region had experienced attacks due to guerrilla activity. He was influenced by reforms implemented in the region by the empire under pressure from the Great Powers after the Ilinden revolt of 1903. Niyazi thought that European powers were pushing Ottoman Christians into uprisings against the state to defeat the empire and wanted to prevent the development of propaganda by the Russians and Austrians in Macedonia. He felt that Ottomans were viewed negatively in the West and that the Great Powers did not care about the majority Muslim population of Macedonia, as they wanted to partition the empire. Niyazi and his colleagues preferred to preserve the empire with all its multiethnic and multireligious population and denounced attacks by reactionary Muslims against Christians, yet they had limited knowledge of Ottoman politics.

Coming from an area where the strongest supporters of the Young Turks among Albanians in the Balkans originated from central and southern Macedonia, those events motivated Niyazi to become part of the CUP. He became an army captain (kolağası). The position was obtained for him by the CUP through its powerful underground influence in government and Niyazi was stationed in Resne where the committee thought he could be most useful toward the cause. At Resne he played an influential role in recruiting people into the CUP. In military operations against bands, Niyazi's actions were done on behalf of the CUP instead of the Ottoman government. Niyazi had a reputation of being an Albanian with close connections to other Albanians living in Macedonia, possessed strong authority among fellow Muslims in the area where he resided and could communicate with them as he spoke both Albanian (his mother tongue) and Turkish.

=== Young Turk Revolution (1908) ===
I explained that our working for the goal of justice would assure absolute equality because we are all brothers, the Turk, Albanian, Bulgarian, Greek, Vlach, Serb.

— Ahmet Niyazi Bey, 1908,

==== Planning for revolution ====
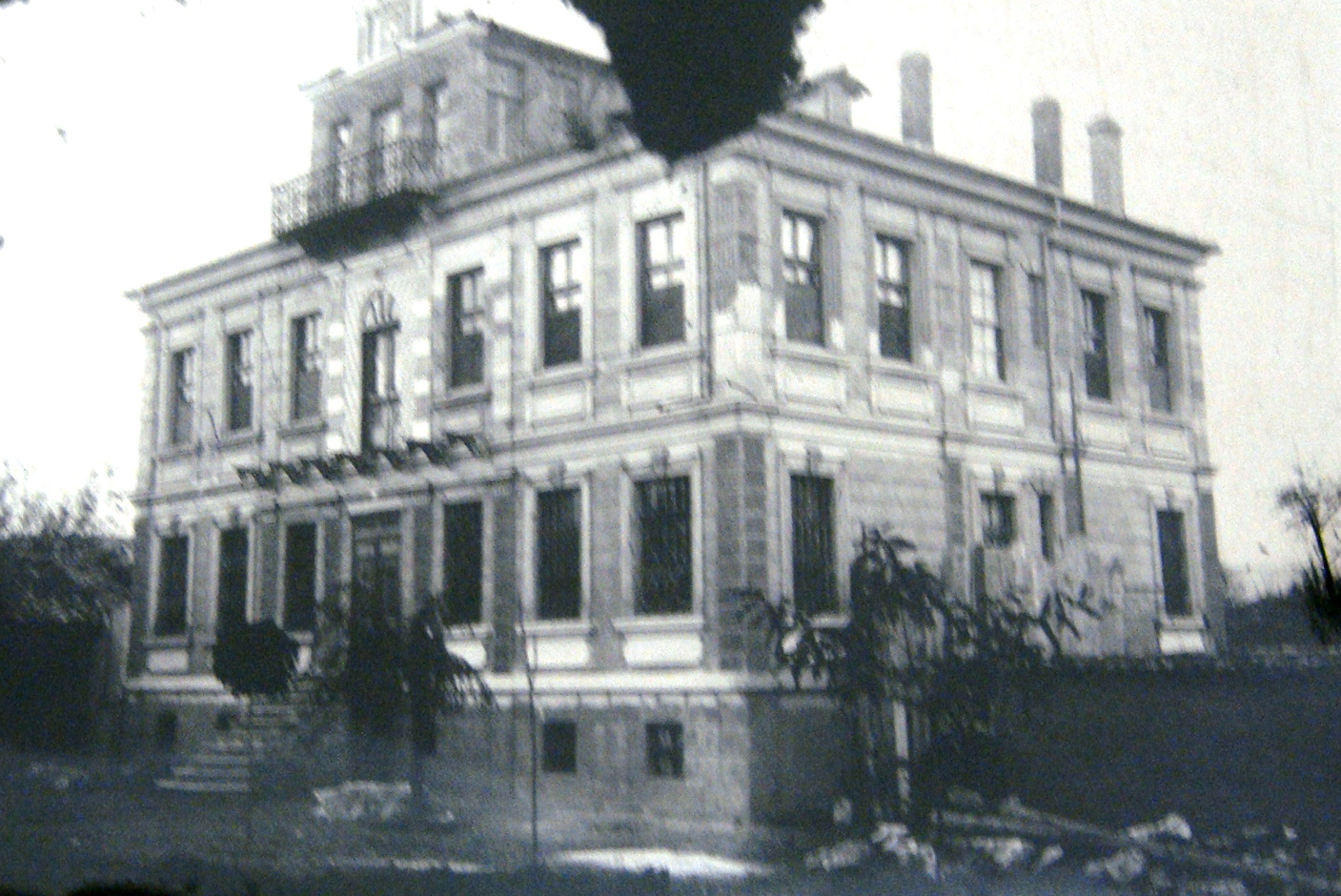
Niyazi Bey's house in Resen, 1909

Niyazi was an important member of the councils held by the Young Turks. Starting from March 1908 some soldiers initiated mutinies after the CUP organised meetings and encouraged them to demand better work conditions. Niyazi stated that troops who achieved redress attributed their success to the committee. CUP publications calling for action against the sultan and prevention of foreign occupation like Şura-yı Ümmet, Mechveret Supplement Français and Ahmed Rıza's pamphlet on the army influenced junior officers such as Niyazi who described their "extraordinary impact in illuminating minds". Following a meeting in Reval between Tsar Nicholas II and Edward VII (9-12 June 1908) rumors of a partition of Macedonia through imminent Russo-British intervention spread and were accelerated by the CUP, whereas Niyazi took it as a signal to act immediately. At the time Niyazi heard rumors regarding the Reval meeting and experienced three sleepless nights that left him "flushed with anxiety and excitement" which shaped his conviction that he "found salvation in sacrifice and death". He discussed matters with the local CUP membership and the CUP Monastir branch that followed on with a decision by Niyazi to form a band and head into the mountains.

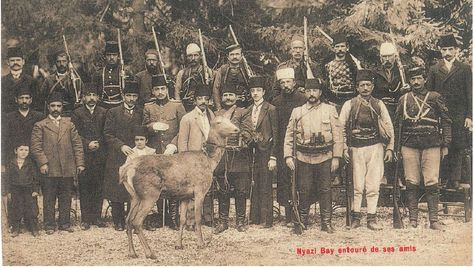
Niyazi Bey in the center with his band in 1908. Hoca Cemal Efendi, the town mayor, can be seen in white turban and black robe two men to Niyazi's left.

On 28 June 1908 Niyazi at his home advised Hoca Cemal Efendi, the mayor and Tahir Efendi, the police commissioner of Resne to form a band and on 29 June repeated those calls to a larger group of Muslims where he inscribed on his hat the words "Hürriyet ya da ölüm" (freedom or death). The group was placed under the direction of the CUP. Niyazi modeled his guerrilla band on Bulgarian, Serb and Greek bands operating in Macedonia that had been formed in the preceding decade in the region. In his memoirs Niyazi wrote that he formed his CUP band on 28 June 1908, yet for some time before that he had been giving confiscated weapons from Macedo-Bulgarian villages to fellow members as CUP headquarters planned to mobilise bands from mid-June. Cemal Efendi, as the mayor of Resen, a spiritual leader (Sufi cleric) and a member of the Young Turks had traveled to Monastir for talks with its CUP branch about the details of action to be taken and had obtained approval.

==== Start of revolution ====
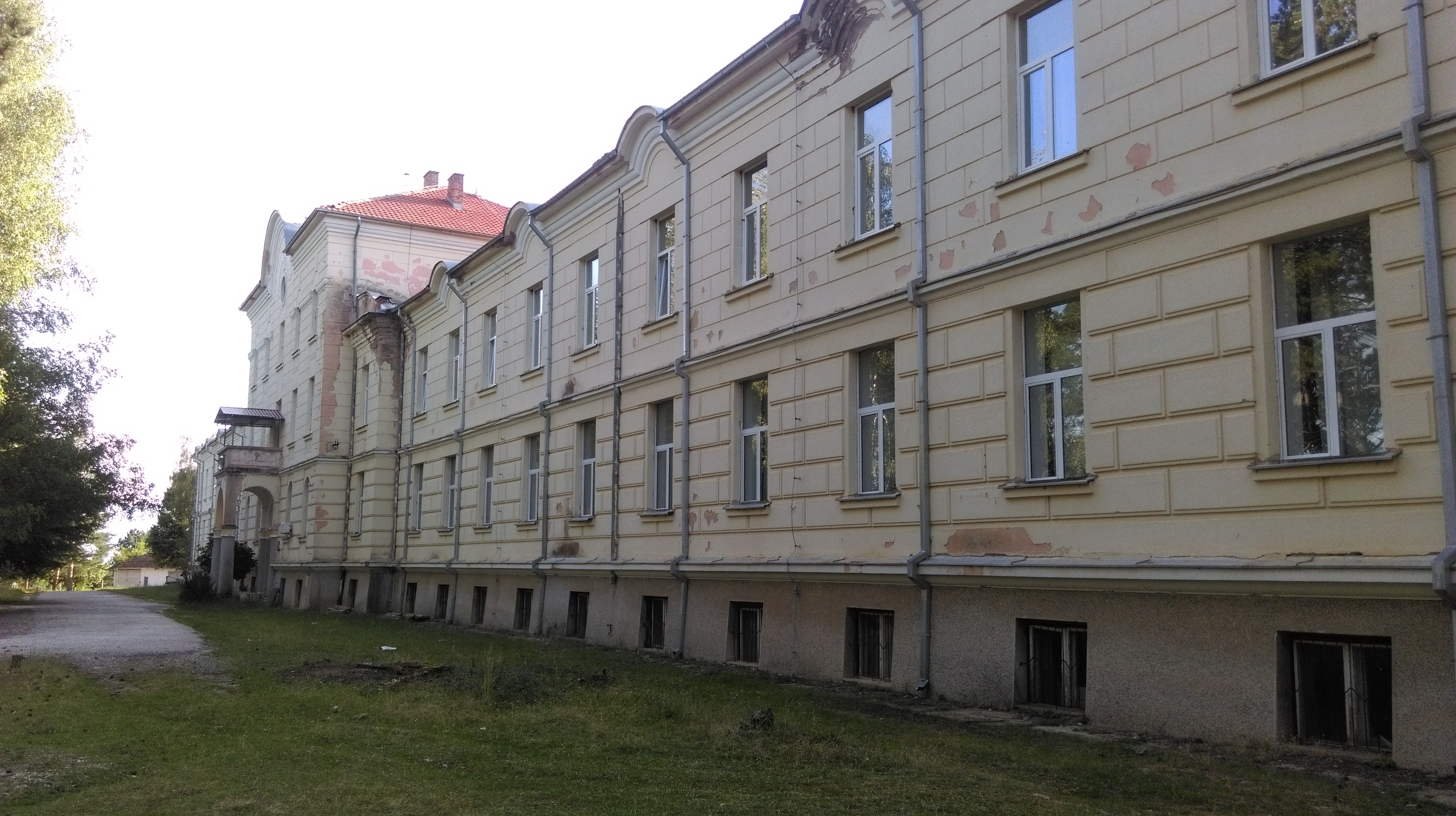
Resne Ottoman army barracks reused as a secondary school in modern Resen

In July the CUP conspiracy involving Niyazi was uncovered by the military mufti of the Ottoman Third Army stationed in Monastir. The mufti, a palace spy and police agent was shot and wounded to stop him from reporting back to Istanbul. A military commission was sent from Istanbul to investigate subversion within the army in the area. Fearing discovery on 3 July 1908 Niyazi spread rumors of an approaching Bulgarian band and lured out most of the Resne garrison and its commanding officers from the town. In Resne, as some other officers were attending Friday prayers, Niyazi along with mayor Cemal Efendi, police commissioner Tahir Efendi, tax commissioner Tahsin Effendi and two hundred men raided the military depot. From the Resne depot they seized fifteen boxes of ammunition, seventy rifles that were given to volunteers and 600 Ottoman liras from the garrison safe that was divided among people within the band. All escaped from Resne into the nearby mountains from where Niyazi initiated the Young Turk Revolution and issued a proclamation that called for the restoration of the constitution of 1876 without specifically mentioning the CUP. On the night prior to his departure Niyazi entrusted the care of his family to his brother in law Ismail Hakki Bey, an Albanian national awakening figure.

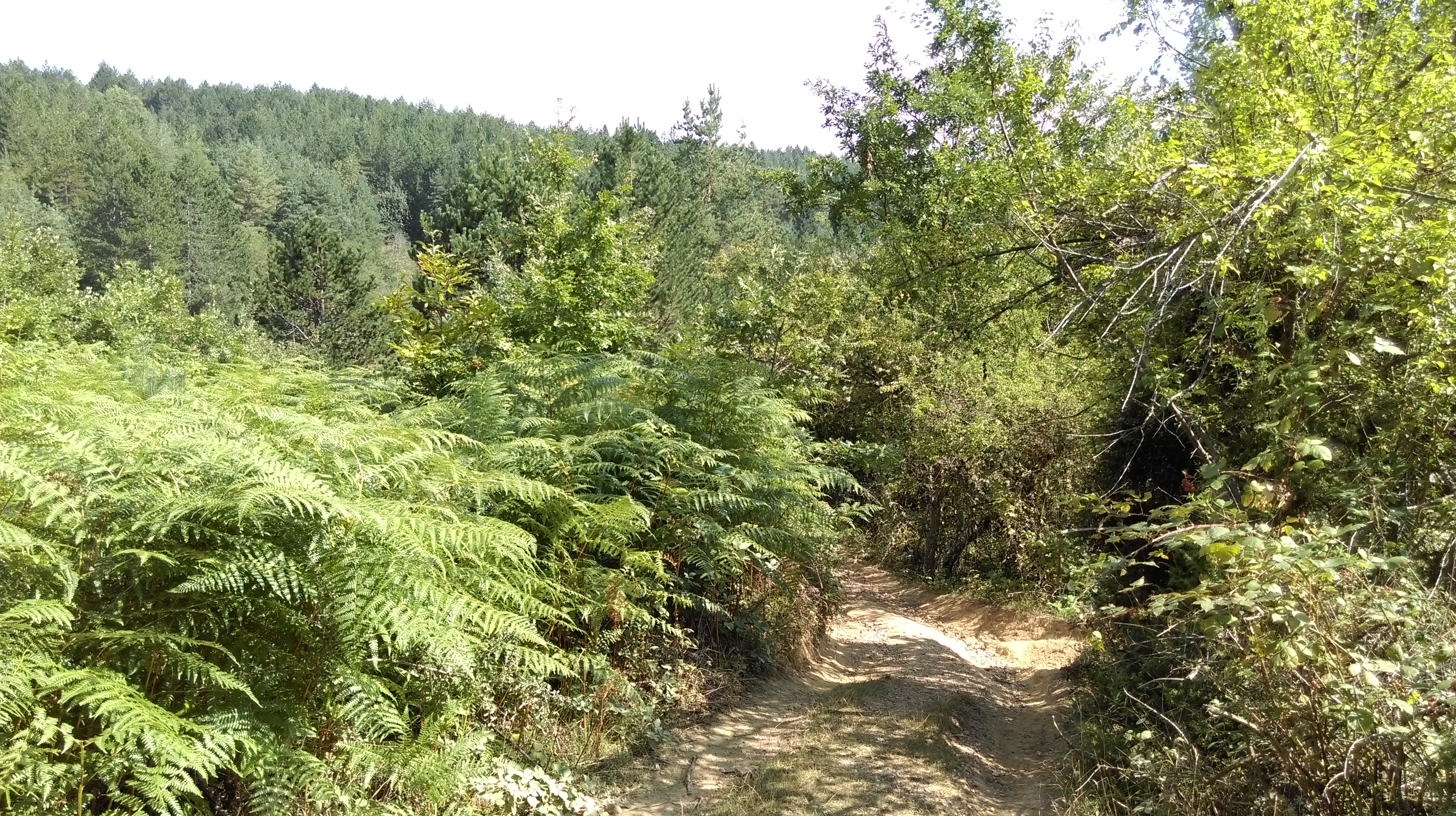
Forest and hilly terrain surrounding the former Ottoman barracks, Resen

Initially composed of 160-240 volunteers (mostly of Albanian descent), Niyazi's band was named the CUP Resne National battalion. The group consisted of civilian supporters who were in the belief that they were in pursuit of a Bulgarian band and CUP members involved in plotting the revolution from 28 June. Nine soldiers from Niyazi's battalion participated and once in the mountains thirty more volunteers from the Prespa region joined. Later, the initial reason of pursuing a Macedo-Bulgarian band was discarded and Niyazi informed his troops and volunteers that there was no such band and four of his soldiers left and returned to the Resne barracks. Niyazi's band grew to 500 troops at the end of the first week and was joined by 800 armed civilians in the mountains. In short time the band was joined by two more officers, other officials and people from the Prespa region.

Niyazi sought to build his support base among local Muslims as the uprising was mainly a Muslim movement. To gain the support of Muslim villagers, officers focused on local issues of discontent with government, lack of services such as schools and roads, heavy taxation and protection from roaming armed bands as opposed to invoking the constitution. Niyazi also undertook other measures such as forcing local clans into truces were blood feud was active among northern Geg and some southern Tosk Albanians. In Albanian villages officers induced locals to make a besa (oath) of support. The band grew as they visited surrounding Albanian Muslim villages adding local Albanian notables, Muslim bands, army deserters and other volunteers into its ranks. Niyazi presented his 'national battalion' as a patriotic Ottoman band and that made it recognisable for other similar bands, Albanian Tosk nationalists, deserters and criminals to join the group. The deserters and criminals referred to by Niyazi as "vile blackguards" due to their "past crimes" took oaths and joined his band after he granted them a pardon.

The well developed imperial telegraph network was used by Niyazi and on behalf of his band he sent proclamations to provincial and local officials along with the palace that demanded injustices and inequality be combated and the constitution restored. Ottoman authorities that Niyazi addressed through appeals and ultimatums were a declaration to the Governor General in Monastir, Inspectorate General of Rumelia and Palace secretariat along with letters of accusation to the Gendarme Officer of Resne and Commandant of the Gendarmerie in Monastir. He also made appeals addressed to various social and ethnic groups in the empire. It is unclear whether the CUP had a fixed date for the revolution and in comments to a journalist following the event Niyazi said that they acted earlier than was planned, but did not give a date for the predetermined day. Niyazi also stated that documents with details giving information to executors about certain plans were according to strict CUP orders burned by branch executive committees.

==== Spread of the revolution ====
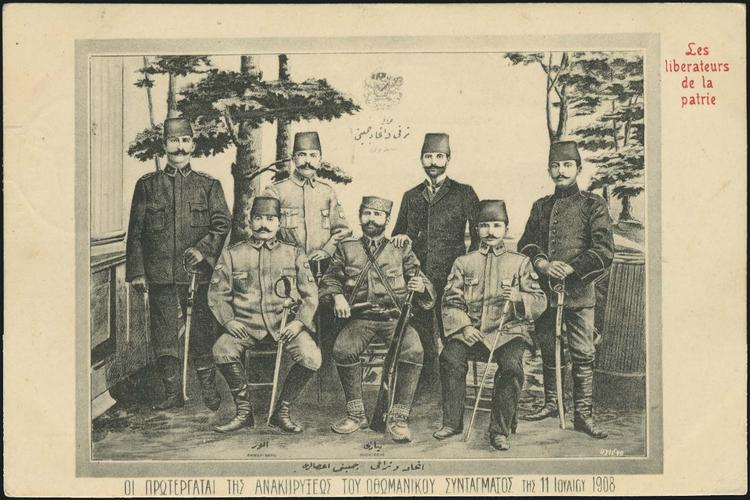
Niyazi Bey (first row, centre) with other CUP members, 1908

At the same time and following Niyazi's example, Enver Bey in Tikveş, Eyüp Sabri in Ohri and Bekir Fikri in Grebene were three of several officers who went into the mountains and formed guerrilla bands (çetes). From the outset in July Sabri worked closely with Niyazi. No order had come from the Young Turk (CUP) committee in Salonica and instead the uprising developed spontaneously as news spread from one Ottoman army unit to another and among the various local CUP committees. For the revolt to get local support Niyazi and Enver played on fears of possible foreign intervention. Notables of Resne supported Niyazi's band as Muslims in much of the town and surrounding villages were CUP members. Niyazi's reasons for going against the sultan was to defend liberty, initiate reforms for both Muslims and Christians and was of the view that "Rather than live basely, i have preferred to die... either death or the salvation of the fatherland".

To deal with Niyazi and other guerrilla bands formed by deserting Ottoman soldiers, Abdul Hamid II sent general Shemsi Pasha with two battalions to Resne and while in Monastir he was assassinated on 7 July by an Ottoman officer and CUP revolutionary Atıf Kamçıl. For the revolution the murder was a turning point that demoralised the palace and it removed a dangerous opponent for the CUP that could have mobilised Albanians against their forces. Ahmet Tevfik Pasha, the Ottoman foreign minister sent letters to Ottoman ambassadors. He described the palace position on events and accused Niyazi of organising bands made up of deserters, subversives and other people influenced by such individuals and instructed them to inform foreign governments and the press.

==== Overtures to the Macedo-Bulgarian population ====
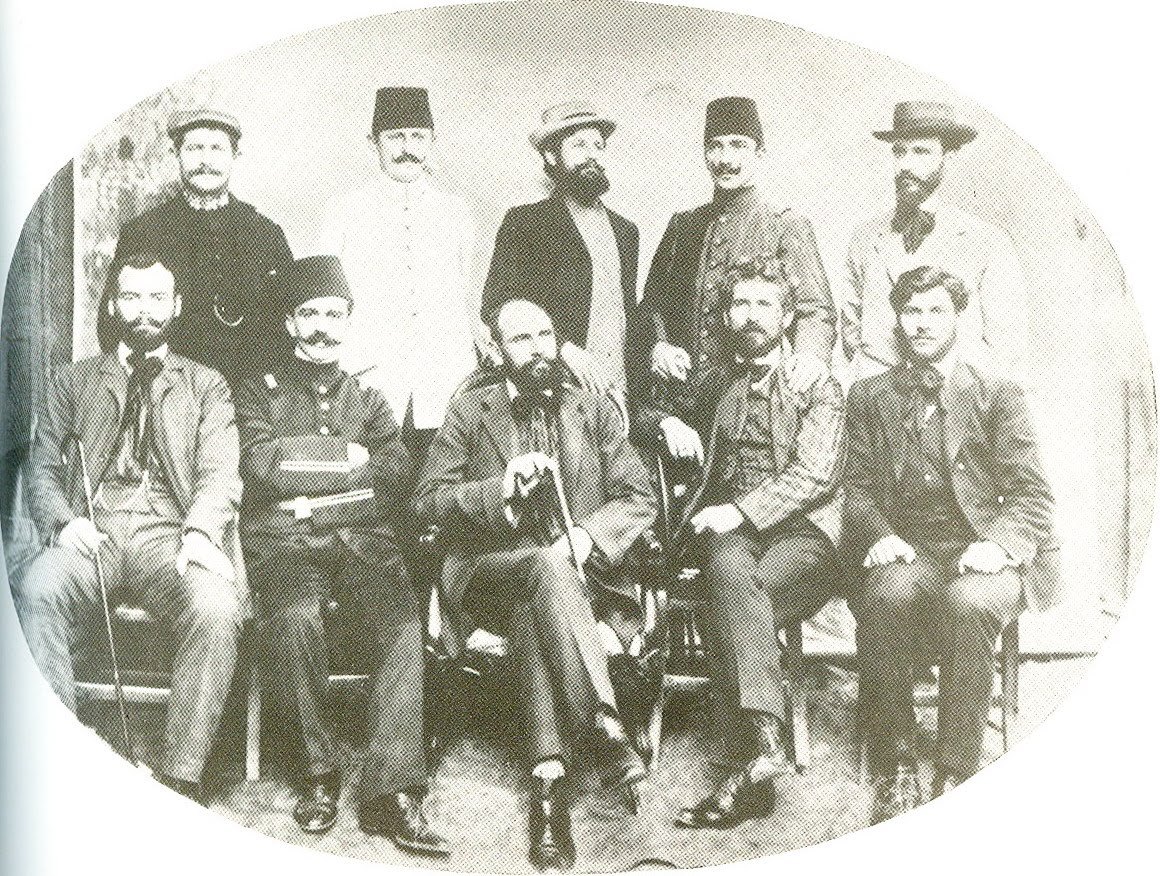
Niyazi Bey (first row, second left) with Bulgarian revolutionaries, 1908

Niyazi made several overtures to the local Macedo-Bulgarian population of the Resne area to join the revolution. During the revolution, a sister of an IMRO voyvoda (chieftain) whose band Niyazi annihilated years earlier asked him to rescue her kidnapped son from a Serbian band. Viewing the appeal as a "blessing of God", Niyazi took a Serb teacher from Resne as hostage to force the Serbian band to release the child. The Serb teacher eventually became a CUP member translating Niyazi's appeals into Bulgarian and Serbian while also assisting him in establishing contacts with Serb villagers and forcing the Serb band to release the boy.

Among local Macedo-Bulgarians the image of Niyazi was boosted with the release of the child. A local band leader who was his foe and badly beaten by Niyazi in 1906 joined the CUP band and told him that "now i will die for you". Amidst these events an appeal was issued by Niyazi to local Bulgarians that outsiders would not be allowed to rule the region and placed blame on the government and its "corrupt officials" for "causing bad things to happen". He promised justice and equality for Bulgarians while warning that people disobeying those "orders" would be hung, a punishment extended to notables of a settlement if a band entered a town or village and CUP authorities were not informed. Approving of Niyazi's actions the CUP Monastir branch cautioned against the recruitment by force of "Bulgarian or other Christian" people into his band.

==== Recruitment of Albanians ====
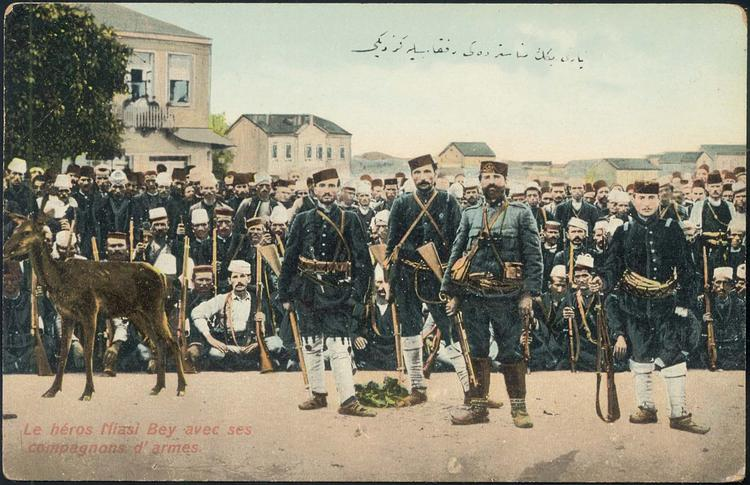
Ahmet Niyazi Bey (first row, second right), his famous deer (first left) and mostly Albanian forces (background) during the Young Turk Revolution of 1908

At first Albanian recruits into the CUP originating from the army and among other coreligionists that came from Ohri, Resne, and Monastir were accepted and those from the Albanian committee rejected. Niyazi placed his efforts on mobilizing and working with Albanians for the cause such as his comrades in the army and as circumstances changed during the revolution he also recruited prominent individuals like Çerçiz Topulli whom he regarded as "the Chief of the Tosk Committee of Albanians". During those attempts to secure Albanian support, Niyazi commented that Albanians complained about the Turks focusing on their own nationalist interests. In Albanian inhabited territories, Niyazi visited Elbasan, Korçë, Debre and Ohri whereas his revolutionary methods involved expelling Ottoman officials, tax collectors and creating Albanian militia to maintain order. Niyazi sent a letter to Topulli inviting him for a meeting to talk about conditions for a union.

Representatives from Topulli met with Niyazi in Korçë. Albanian delegates accused the Turks of lacking commitment to Ottomanism resulting in their struggle to defend themselves from foreigners and Ottomans, whereas Niyazi replied that Turks made much effort toward promoting Ottomanism with the creation of the CUP being evidence of that endeavour. Revolutionary support from Korçë rested upon the condition for the establishment of Albanian autonomy and during negotiations with Albanian committee members Niyazi accepted their proposal for an autonomous Albania to be administered under a governor selected by the sultan. After the discussion Albanian delegates accepted the CUP invitation. All joined through an oath ceremony and were enrolled with promises to bring Topulli and other prominent Albanian committee members for a final meeting to talk about details of the agreement.

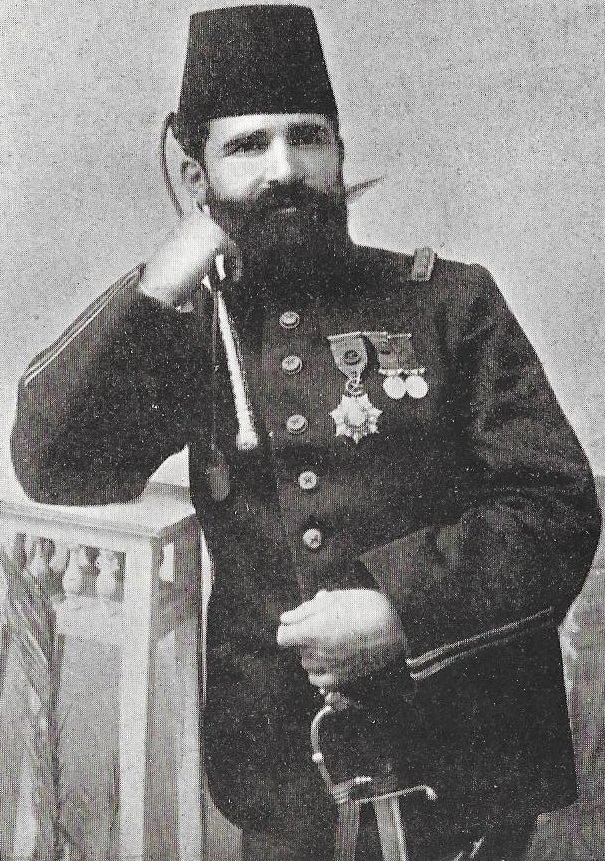
Ahmet Niyazi Bey, 1908

Hyrsev Starova Bey, a local Albanian notable and friend of Niyazi's father was tasked with arranging the meeting that was scheduled to occur in Pogradec. Hyrsev also contacted Hysen Baba, an Albanian Bektashi sheikh from the Melçan tekke who acted as mediator between Niyazi and Topulli that influenced the latter along with other brigand leaders to support the CUP cause. Niyazi viewed the meeting as mainly unimportant due to local Albanians already pledging allegiance to the CUP. During negotiations with Albanian committee members the significance of Albanian participation made Niyazi remark that "most of the leaders and partisans of [the movement for] constitutional administration were not Turkish". The Korçë Albanian committee lent support to Niyazi and at the request of the CUP called upon guerrillas based in the mountains around Korçë to join Ottoman insurgent bands with the Ohri Albanian committee heeding the directive. Topulli was hard pressed by fellow Albanians to meet with Niyazi to talk about joint action and he arrived in Pogradec with his band on 21 July 1908.

Niyazi also worked to recruit other Muslim guerrilla bands to the revolutionary cause. Throughout the revolution, guerrilla bands of both Niyazi and Enver were Muslim (mostly Albanian) paramilitaries. Niyazi described that Albanian Tosk bands and Bulgarian bands had been united under Topulli in Ohri. Topulli's guerrilla band gave important support to Niyazi and his forces during their capture of the Resne garrison and the event was a small military victory in the campaign to oust the Hamidian regime. Niyazi's band numbered 2000 men in the third week of the revolution and he along with Enver got like minded officials and civilian notables to send multiple petitions to the Ottoman place. Activists in Kosovo organised a large demonstration in support of Niyazi and the wider anti-Hamidian opposition. Many of the Muslim Albanians involved in the revolution like Niyazi saw themselves as CUP members first and not as Albanian activists. Unlike organisers such as Behaeddin Shakir and Talaat Pasha, Niyazi and other Albanians involved in revolutionary actions did not have decision-making positions within the CUP, yet they felt that the revolution was an Albanian undertaking and expected in return special treatment.

==== Declaration of constitutional government and end of revolution ====
Niyazi's band adopted a deer that appeared to them while they were in a village near Monastir, as the animal was interpreted by the group as a spiritual guide sent by god directing them toward their objective. Tatar Osman Pasha, Shemsi's replacement was kidnapped after the Resne band of Niyazi, the Ohri band of Sabri and two Albanian bands conducted an attack on Monastir. On 22 July Monastir was captured on orders from the CUP with news of Niyazi's actions reaching Salonica early in the morning on 23 July and was spread all over Macedonia by the CUP controlled telegraph service. Niyazi proclaimed the constitution on 23 July in front of large crowds of Muslims and Christians, Ottoman officials, the town garrison and battalions from other areas gathered in Monastir, actions that were simultaneously replicated in several towns of Macedonia.

On 23 July Niyazi returned to Resne and met with guerrilla leaders Topulli and Mihal Grameno where he expressed his gratitude and viewed the declaration of the CUP constitution as advantageous for the Albanian nation. The worsening situation in the Ottoman Balkan provinces and lack of government control along with army desertions motivated the sultan to issue an imperial decree restoring the 1876 constitution on 24 July 1908.

=== Post revolution ===
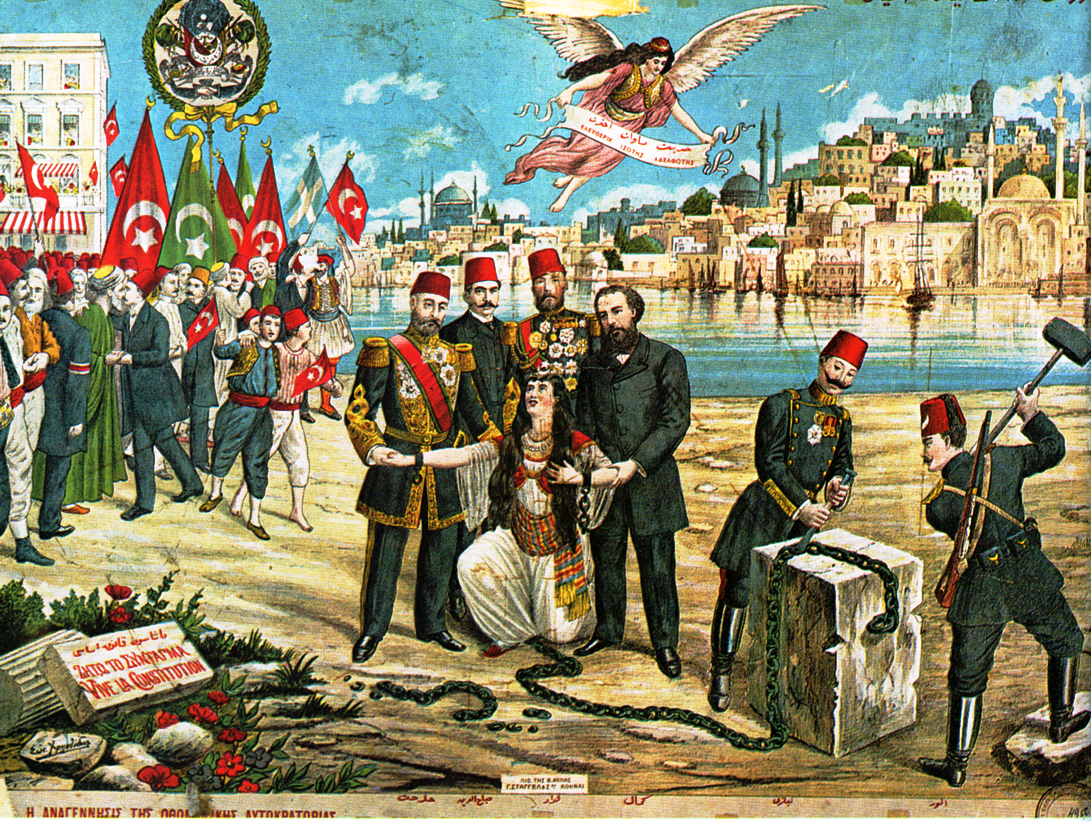
Ottoman poster celebrating the 1908 revolution. Niyazi is depicted in the lower right hand corner with a large mustache freeing Liberty, personified as a woman, from her chains.

In the aftermath of the revolution Niyazi and Enver remained in the political background due to their youth and junior military ranks with both agreeing that photographs of them would not be disturbed to the general public, yet this decision was rarely observed. Instead Niyazi and Enver as leaders of the revolution elevated their positions into near legendary status with their images placed on postcards and distributed throughout the Ottoman state. During the revolution the Manakis brothers had photographed Niyazi and their pictures reconstructed him as an ordinary man of the people with his prominent dust covered mustache giving an appearance of a recent arrival from the hills commanding rebels. In one iconic photograph showing Niyazi and his famous deer they are portrayed as the materialisation of freedom with him and his rifle depicting a military figure of power represented by his surrounding soldiers and bandits. In other photographs taken by the Manakis brothers of the revolution, Niyazi is present alongside revolutionaries Topulli and Grameno. Niyazi also appeared on a prominent poster as a figure with a big mustache having freed Liberty personified by a woman from her chains and surrounded by other figures from the revolution.

Toward the latter part of 1908, photographs of Niyazi and Enver had reached Istanbul and among school children in the city immersed in fanfare, they played with masks that depicted the revolutionaries. In other images produced of the time the new sultan Mehmed V is presented in the centre flanked by Niyazi and Enver to either side. As the actions of both men carried the appearance of initiating the revolution, Niyazi, an Albanian and Enver, a Turk (with Albanian heritage on his mother's side) later got popular acclaim as "heroes of freedom" (hürriyet kahramanları) and symbolised Albanian-Turkish cooperation. Niyazi was also known by the sobriquets "Hero of the Revolution" and the "Turkish Garibaldi".

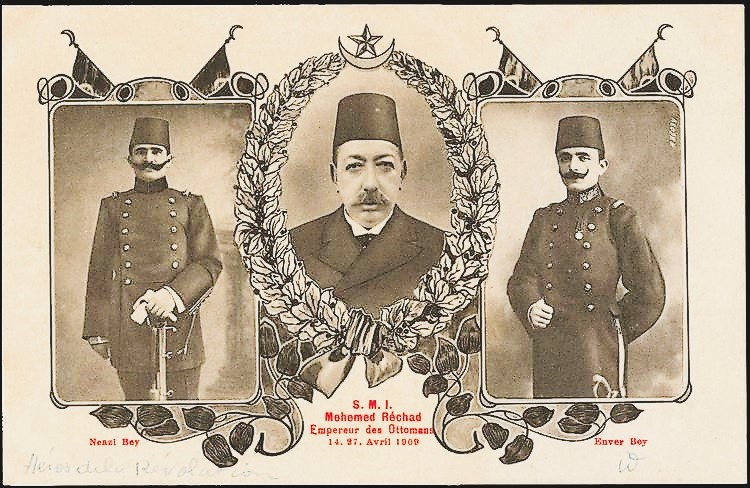
Postcard of Mehmed V flanked by Niyazi Bey (left) and Enver Bey (right)

Soon after the success of the revolution, Niyazi attempting to raise hopes for the new order condemned the former Hamidian regime in a speech delivered in Resne and it was published in a pamphlet during 1908. Niyazi warned his audience about the risks of Macedonia and Anatolia becoming colonies of other countries like other former Ottoman territories. In 1908 the CUP committee held its congress at the conclusion of the revolution and agreed to publish Niyazi's memoirs as a book which appeared toward the end of the year. The Committee wanted Niyazi to exaggerate the role the CUP played in the revolution and give the appearance that they directed all actions during those events.

Later in 1910 they were published by the CUP Monastir Central Committee in Istanbul and the memoirs consist of detailed biographical information about Niyazi from 1887 to 1908 relating to his military action and politics in Macedonia. Niyazi felt the military and political hierarchy blamed him for his personal fame arising from the revolution and he was compelled to justify it in his memoirs. His memories of events also contain contradictions and in his introduction Niyazi warns the reader that the memoirs are not a complete account of the revolution and they should not rely on it having revelations about the history or way the CUP was founded. Niyazi's memoirs are full of information about the Lake Prespa region, the towns of Resne and Ohri and he highlighted the contributions of Albanians during the revolution for its success and his efforts to gain their support. As with documents he published that included letters and telegraphs which were sent or received, Niyazi kept insisting in his memoirs on the action he took and conducted personally along with his group while little attention was devoted toward Enver. In his memoirs Niyazi enriched them with photographs taken of him and his revolutionaries by the Manakis brothers. For a limited period the self glorifying memoirs of Niyazi were a prime text for the revolutionaries.

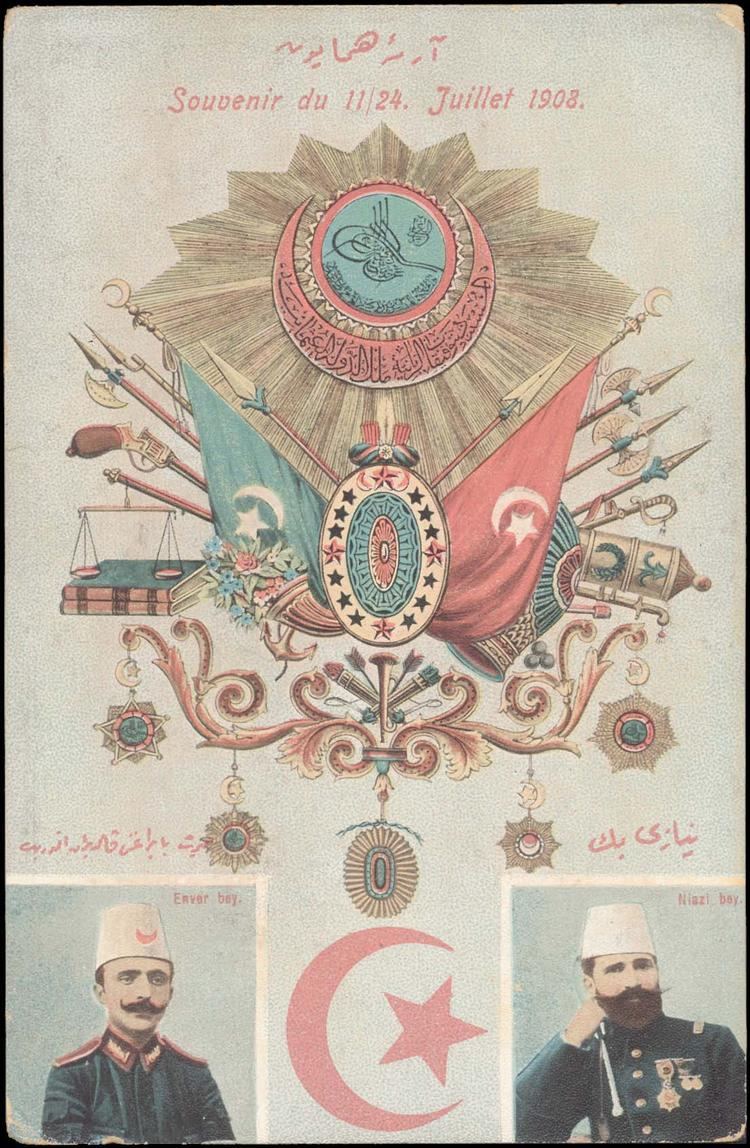
Niyazi Bey (right) and Enver Bey (left) on an Ottoman postcard celebrating the 1908 Young Turk Revolution

In the aftermath of the revolution, CUP unity gave way to personal rivalries which by March 1909, rumor had it that Niyazi had fallen out with the main views of the Young Turks and began to have a liberal outlook regarding the situation in Macedonia. Niyazi was a delegate representing Resne at the Congress of Dibra (July 1909) organised by the CUP regarding Albanian ethno-linguistic rights. He refused to sign any resolutions due to disagreements with other delegates over its contents. Niyazi was a CUP member till his death and never managed to generate a considerable following among prominent and other rank CUP members apart from his involvement during the revolution. The Ottoman newspaper Volkan, a strong supporter of the constitution published adulatory pieces about Niyazi and Enver in 1909.

=== Counterrevolution (1909) and retirement from army ===
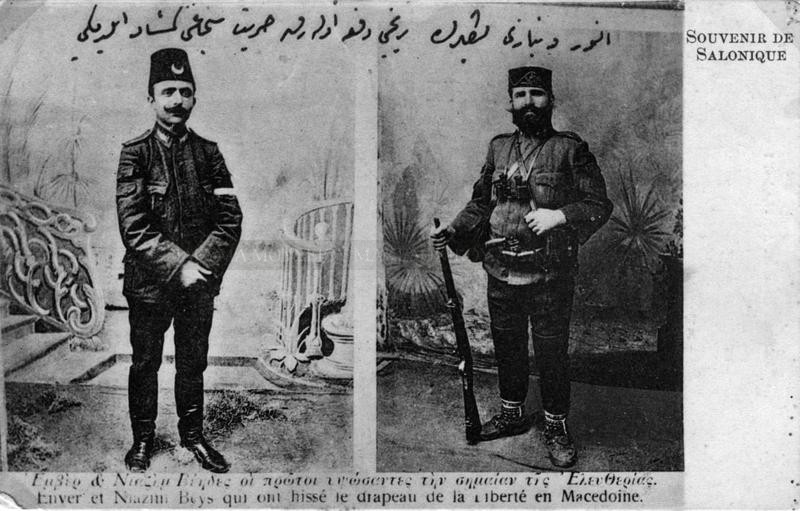
Postcard of the Young Turk Revolution showing Enver Bey (left) and Niyazi Bey (right)

A group of mainly Albanian soldiers stationed in Istanbul mutinied after CUP authorities planned to replace them with other army units from Macedonia and they attempted a countercoup in 1909 to undo the 1908 revolution. The Ottoman Third Army, stationed in Macedonia and led by Mahmud Shevket Pasha was joined by Niyazi who brought 1,800 men from Resne. Niyazi led volunteer units consisting mainly of Albanians that reinforced regular army units and he played a leading role in suppressing the counterrevolution. Together in military operations that were directed by a fellow Albanian Ali Pasha Kolonja they retook Istanbul (23 April) with little resistance from the mutineers and deposed sultan Abdul Hamid II.

After those events he retired from the army and he devoted himself to the development of Resne where he built public buildings, schools and a palatial home, the Saraj. The construction of the Saraj began in 1905 after Niyazi received a postcard of Versailles that inspired his desire to have a French-style estate whose exterior was completed in 1909 after the CUP revolution. As he died years later in Albania, Niyazi never lived to see his estate completed. By 1911 Niyazi still remained in Resne and barely hid his exasperation at the deteriorating security situation in Macedonia related to fighting between guerrilla bands and Ottoman forces.

=== Sultan's Balkan tour (1911) ===
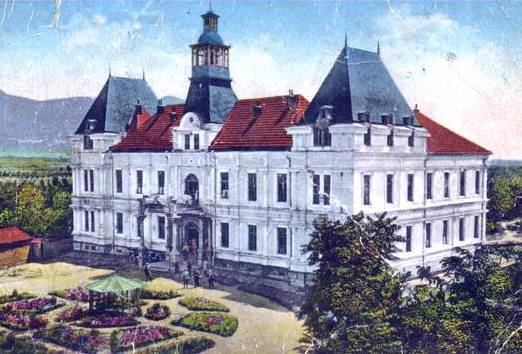
The Saraj of Resen, built by Niyazi Bey in the early 1900s

The Albanian uprisings of 1910 and 1911 made the CUP send Mehmed V on a goodwill tour of Kosovo and Macedonia during June 1911 to recover loyalty from the Albanians, inspire patriotism and solidarity among local peoples and to counter nationalism. Niyazi arrived with 600 men from Resne and as a Mücahit-i Muhterem (honoured fighter) the sultan received him in Salonica on 9 June. Due to his Albanian ethnicity, role as hero of the revolution and being a revered yet politically marginal CUP member Niyazi became a central figure in the royal tour of Macedonia.

On 11 June, the sultan proceeded to Üsküp on a slow seven-hour train ride with many stopovers and Niyazi traveled on a separate pilot train in front of the imperial entourage with an announcement that anyone seen coming close to the tracks would be shot. Later after returning from Kosovo the sultan visited Monastir where Niyazi reenacted scenes from the revolution such as the entry into town by soldiers under his command in 1908. The reenactment by Niyazi also involved Eyüp Sabri where both men wore their old clothes, rode horses accompanied by a gun carriage with the event recorded on camera by the Manakis brothers. The film titled Sultan Rešad's Visit to Bitola is currently preserved in the Macedonian Archives.

=== Balkan Wars (1912-1913) and death ===
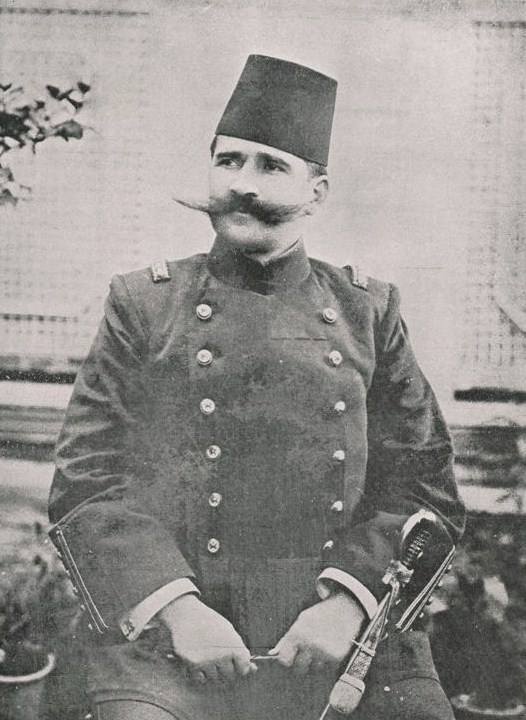
Ahmet Niyazi Bey, 1912

During the Balkan Wars (1912-1913), Niyazi and his Resne regiment remained until the end of the conflict and fought alongside Cavit Pasha. In April 1913 he arrived in Vlorë to board a ferry departing for Istanbul where he was shot by four men on the port docks. No one claimed responsibility for his death as rumors of the time speculated that either someone having a personal vendetta, an Albanian nationalist or a CUP rival ordered the assassination. Niyazi was killed by Albanian committee members who were the men of Ismail Toptani and Ismail Kemal. As the death of Niyazi was the result of people close to him and not of war or battles, the event is remembered in a Turkish rhyming proverb as "Ne şehittir ne gazi, hiç yoluna gitti Niyazi" (Neither a martyr nor a gazi, Niyazi died for nothing).

== Personal life and family ==
Niyazi was married to Feride Hanım (died 1966), who originated from an old Istanbulite family in the Saraçhanebaşı (Saraçhane) neighbourhood of the Fatih district of the city. He had two sons Mithat (born 1911) and Saim (born 1913) with Feride and during the Balkan Wars she went back to Istanbul. Niyazi has descendants from both sons in Istanbul and they carry the surname Resnelioğlu in honour of their ancestor. The Resnelioğlu family unsuccessfully lobbied the Turkish government in the 1980s-1990s for assistance to have the body of Niyazi exhumed from Vlorë, Albania and reburied in Turkey at the Hill of Eternal Freedom (Hürriyet-i Ebediye Tepesi).

== Cultural references ==
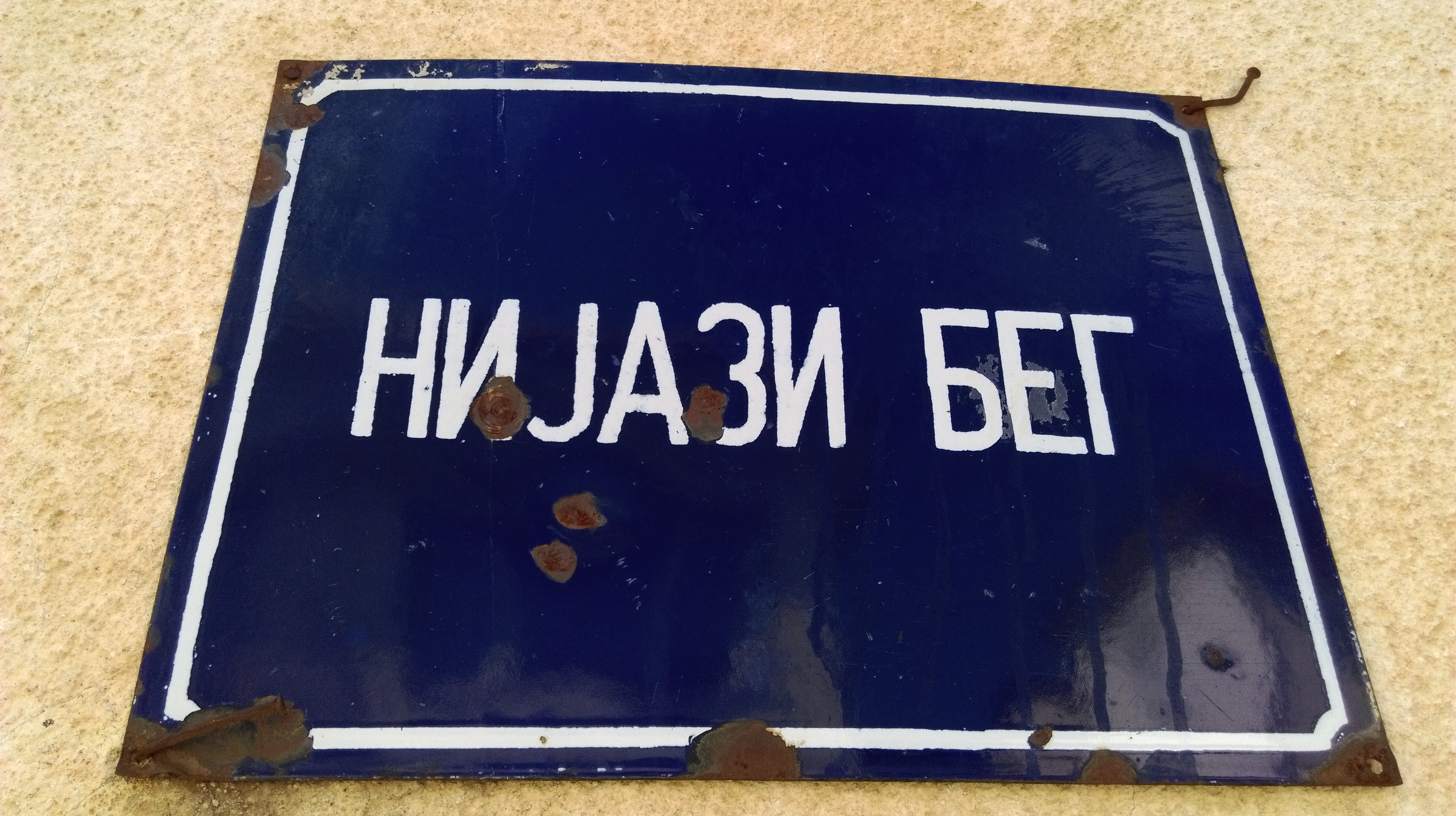
Niyazi Beg (Niyazi Bey) street in modern Resen

As a tribute to his role in the Young Turk Revolution that began the Second Constitutional Era of the Ottoman Empire, Niyazi is mentioned along with Enver in the March of the Deputies (Turkish: Mebusan Marşı or Meclis-i Mebusan Marşı), the anthem of the Chamber of Deputies, the lower house of the Ottoman parliament. It was performed in 1909 upon the opening of the parliament. The fourth line of the anthem reads "Long live Niyazi, long live Enver" (Turkish: Yaşasın Niyazi, yaşasın Enver). In the 1910s Niyazi was mentioned in other songs that reflected the Young Turks move toward a Turcocentric ideology.
