= Bekir Fikri =

Albanian Ottoman revolutionary (1882–1914)

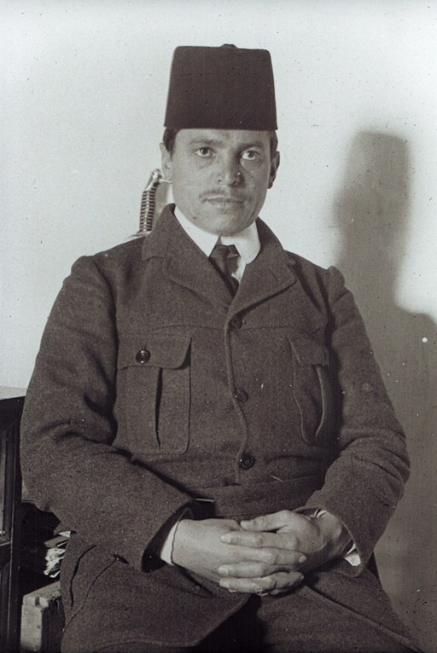
- Bekir Fikri, 1914
- Born: c. 1882; Çorhlu, Ottoman Empire (present-day Greece)
- Died: 21 December 1914 (aged 31–32); Sarikamish, Russian Empire (present-day Turkey)
- Occupations: Lieutenant colonel (Binbaşı) and revolutionary
- Movement: Committee of Union and Progress
- Children: Kemal Grebene
- Relatives: Bekir Yaşar Grebene (grand children), Kemal Grebene (great-grandchild), Kamil Grebene (great-grandchild)

Bekir Fikri (c. 1882 – 21 December 1914), was an Ottoman revolutionary that participated in the Young Turk Revolution (1908) and fought with distinction during the Balkan Wars (1912–1913).

== Biography ==
=== Origin ===
Bekir Fikri / Beqir Grebenea was of Albanian origin. He was born into an Albanian-Turkish family Fikri ethnically belonged to the Vallahades community (Greek speaking Muslims of the Grebene region). He was from Çorhlu (modern Agios Georgios) located in the kaza of Grebene, Ottoman Empire in 1882.

=== Early life and career ===
Fikri attended the Monastir Military High School where he was exposed to propaganda that questioned the absolutism of sultan Abdulhamid II and later studied at the Ottoman War Academy graduating in 1903. Later he was sent to participate in the Ottoman conflict in Yemen and returned after three years where he was much affected by his wartime experience. Fikri married a woman whose father had also served in the Yemen conflict. In 1907, he was appointed within his home region in a battalion that fought against bands (çetas). In December of that same year, he joined the Committee of Union and Progress (CUP). Fikri possessed strong authority among fellow Muslims in the area where he resided and could communicate with them as he spoke Albanian, Turkish and Greek as his mother tongue (ethnically he belonged to the so called Vallahades).

As Fikri lived in the southern area of the vilayet of Monastir the threat of Greece made him think that Turks and Albanians had to unite against the "Greek danger". He was convinced that the Ottoman government had to help the Albanians and vice versa, a view that was disliked by some CUP officers that considered any recognition of Albanianism as dangerous for the unification of the empire. The idea of Ottoman-Albanian cooperation had led Fikri to a more conciliatory attitude towards the teaching of Albanian and the choice of the alphabet. Fikri believed that Albanianism was not powerful enough to oppose Hellenism.

=== Young Turk revolution (1908) ===
From 1907 to 1908, he was a member of the Young Turks (CUP). Shortly after his transfer to Alasonya (modern Elassona) in 1908, Fikri learned that Adjutant Major Ahmet Niyazi had deserted the Ottoman army and initiated the Young Turk Revolution. He followed his example by going to Grebene (modern Grevena) where he gave a short speech to local Muslims and within a few hours thereafter formed a large guerrilla band (çeta). The Muslims of Grebene viewed Fikri as their protector from Greek bands. On July 22, Fikri distributed rifles from the town military depot to his band of 360 men and volunteers while leaving a reserve force of 410 well armed locals to control Grebene. Fikri informed Ottoman authorities of the area that his reserve force would take control of Grebene. Facing a deteriorating situation in the Balkans on July 24 sultan Abdul Hamid II restored the constitution of 1876.

=== Balkan Wars (1912–1913) ===
During the Balkan Wars the father, mother, uncle, and two sisters of Fikri were killed by the Greeks. Fikri was of the view that Turks and Albanians must fight together against the Greeks in order to take revenge. He participated in the Balkan Wars and fought to keep the region around Grebene under Ottoman rule. During January 5–6, 1913 Fikri and 1000 men under his command fought to the north of lake Yanya in the Battle of Dristinik when they attacked a Greek force that included some marines. Both sides suffered minimal losses and the battle was inconclusive. He defended the town of Grebene close to the Ottoman-Greek border. As a provincial gendarmerie officer Fikri united the remaining reserve troops (redifs), border guards and gendarmerie, some 800 people under his control and he mobilised civilians. Some Vallahades also fought with Fikri.

The withdrawal of the Ottoman Muretteb VII Corps made Fikri wage a six-month guerrilla campaign against Greek army units and irregular gangs. During that time he covered a mountainous area that was some 100-kilometers long between Yanya (modern Ioannina) and Kozana (modern Kozani) and kept at bay 10-15 Greek battalions and other irregular gangs. In the area between Leskovik and Koniçe (modern Konitsa), his irregular forces devastated the Greek army. Existing power struggles with the Ottoman system made some beys fight against the imperial army and Fikri cited the case of a bey of Nasliç who offered his services to the Greek army. Due to the efforts of Muslims that fought with Fikri, sultan Mehmet V bestowed upon them the honorific of "vatansever" meaning a patriot that loves their homeland. Fikri received the epithet of "Grebene kahramanı" (Hero of Grebene) for his heroism and attained the military rank of captain (yüzbaşı). After the war, Fikri served in Istanbul and protected the palace and government ministries. Later he went to Albania again to intervene in its affairs after the Balkan Wars.

=== Plot for an Ottoman-Albanian military alliance (1913–1914) and death ===
The CUP government in Istanbul had tasked Fikri to bring Albania under Ottoman suzerainty as they viewed the country a threat to Greece and Serbia in any future war. The aims of the CUP wished to compensate for the loss of Ottoman land and reputation during the Balkan Wars and to increase their power in the Balkans again. Dissatisfaction over the selection process of an Albanian monarch in Albania provided the CUP that opportunity. Fikri, by then a lieutenant colonel (binbaşı) worked in Albania on propaganda activities to ensure the establishment of an Ottoman king instead of the German Prince Wilhelm of Wied to the Albanian throne. The CUP supported Ahmed Izzet Pasha, an Ottoman-Albanian officer and CUP member that sought the Albanian throne in 1913. Fikri, as a CUP member was sent by the Ottoman government to prepare for Albania. He travelled from Istanbul to Sofia then Budapest and arrived at Shkodër in November 1913 with 5,000 gold Napoleons to use as an incentive to make people side with him, to hold diplomatic talks and provide them with confidential correspondence with Istanbul. Fikri managed to convince the notables of Shkodër to support Izzet Pasha. Later Fikri traveled to Durrës and through a secret letter to the Istanbul government asked them to deliver troops and ammunition to the town. In same letter Fikri outlined his views that he wanted Izzet Pasha as king of Albania, and to pursue that aim in the southern parts of the country he requested for a transporter, stunner, cannon and ammunition delivery to Durrës. Fikri thought that southern Albania could be convinced through force of arms.

Fikri acting as Izzet Pasha's emissary contacted Ismail Kemal who had declared Albanian independence in November 1912 during the Balkan Wars. He presented Kemal with a plan that envisaged joint Ottoman, Albanian and Bulgarian military action against Greece and Serbia. Albania's reward in the military venture would have been the allocation of Kosovo and Chameria, areas given to Serbia and Greece by the Conference of Ambassadors. Kemal assured Fikri of his loyalty to Izzet Pasha as monarch of Albania and supported a plan from the CUP government in Istanbul to secretly infiltrate troops and weapons into the country to conduct a guerrilla war against Serbian and Greek forces. After these negotiations Fikri sent telegrams to Istanbul, and asked the government to send 200-300 ammunition boxes with bullets, 4 machine guns and 4 cannons to Vlorë. In a telegram sent from Brindisi, Fikri advised that Ismail Kemal and Izzet Pasha should meet somewhere in Europe. In January 1914, 200 Ottoman soldiers and 19 officers with ties to Kemal boarded the steamship Maran for Vlorë. Dressed as Albanian civilians, their objective was to seize the town at night and make Izzet Pasha the monarch of Albania.

The Serbs uncovered the plot and the Serbian consul in Vlorë, Gavrilović, reported the operation to the International Control Commission (ICC), an organisation set up by the Great Powers to temporarily administer Albania until its own political institutions were developed. The ICC disturbed by events allowed Dutch officers sent as a neutral force by the Great Powers to serve as the Albanian Gendarmerie to declare a state of emergency and stop the activities of Fikri. In a raid on the port of Vlorë they discovered during 7–8 January 1914 a total of 11 Ottoman officers and more than 200 soldiers. Another twenty people, including Fikri, were arrested. During Fikri's trial the plot emerged and an ICC military court under Colonel Willem de Veer condemned him to death and he was later pardoned with life imprisonment, while Kemal and his cabinet resigned. Due to the efforts of the Ottoman government Fikri was released from imprisonment on 18 August 1914. Later in 1914 Fikri fought and died at the Battle of Sarikamish during the First World War.

== Literary works and themes ==
=== Balkanlarda tedhiş ve gerilla ===
In the 1900s Fikri fought against Balkan separatist movements and he wrote a book on counter insurgency titled Balkanlarda tedhiş ve gerilla (Terror and Guerrillas in the Balkans). Fikri viewed military innovation as an important factor in warfare. In same book which were also his memoirs, Fikri denounced the activity of Greek bands (çetas), as well as the inaction of the Ottoman administration toward them. He referred to the tyranny of "the so-called civilised, barbarous Greeks" in an introduction of his translation to what Fikri described was a diary belonging to a Greek sergeant that was included within his memoirs. Fikri stated that the diary was the sergeant's narration of sexual assaults of Muslim girls and women and their resistance to those events.

He was of the view that Muslims were in a much worse situation than Christians as the latter were developed due to trade, crafts, education, and support from the Patriarchate. For Fikri Muslims had spent their youth facing death in Yemen or Tripoli and the graveyards of distant borderlands were crowded with Muslim graves. Fikri described that in his village, the number of Christian homes had grown, while that of Muslim homes had diminished. He also wrote that Muslim clerics and soldiers did not receive salaries and had poor living conditions that due to poverty limited their ability to pursue an education. In his book Fikri gave a Muslim point view about the Hellenisation efforts of St. Cosmas in spreading the Greek language and commented that Christian traders were told not to sell goods to Muslims if they did not use Greek to request for them. According to Fikri, the Vallahades are descendants of the first conqueror of Macedonia, Salur, a member of the Oghuz Turks who were placed within the region by the Ottoman administration to subdue the Christian inhabitants and convert them to Islam. After the Greco-Turkish population exchange (1923) the claim put forward by Fikri of a Turkish origin for the Vallahades was used by them as a myth to gain acceptance in their new homeland of Turkey.

=== Ban Ordusunda Kuvva-i Seyyare yahut Grebene ===
Fikri also wrote patriotic works in the Ottoman language. Shortly after the Balkan wars he wrote a book titled Ban Ordusunda Kuvva-i Seyyare yahut Grebene on his wartime experiences. In the early 1920s the Ankara government published an English language report for international audiences on "Greek atrocities in Asia Minor". The Turkish government used contents from Fikri's book Ban Ordusunda to support its claims and create a narrative of continuity that the Greek position was against Turkish existence within the Balkans and Anatolia which spanned from the Balkan Wars until the Turkish War of Independence.
