= Shemsi Pasha (general) =

Ottoman general

Shemsi Pasha Pasha
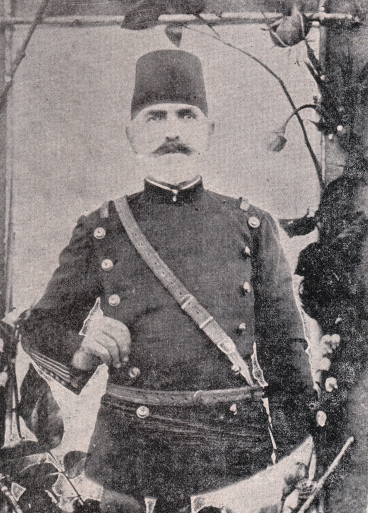
- Shemsi Pasha
- Born: Šemso Čolović; 1846; Biševo, Sanjak of Novi Pazar, Ottoman Empire (present-day Montenegro)
- Died: 7 July 1908 (aged 61–62); Monastir, Ottoman Empire (present-day North Macedonia)
- Other names: Šemsi-paša Biševac, Šemso
- Citizenship: Ottoman
- Occupation: General (ferik)
- Movement: Unionism
- Children: Five

Shemsi Pasha (Turkish: Şemsi Paşa, Serbo-Croatian: Šemsi-paša Biševac, Albanian: Shemsi Pasha; 1846–1908) was an Ottoman general active in the Balkans.

== Biography ==
=== Early life and military career ===
Shemsi was born in the village of Biševo near Rožaje in 1846. Biševo was a small village within the İpek Sanjak of the Kosovo Vilayet. His father was hajji Destan Čolović and his mother was from the Hankušić family. His paternal family had distant origin in Kuči and his maternal family belonged to the Hoti tribe of Peja. Although apparently of "mixed Albanian-Bosnian background", he was known as an Albanian, according to G. Gawrych (2006).

Originating from a humble background and being unschooled, he began his military career first as a private and later was promoted to ferik (general). Shemsi as such was an alaylı (a person that rises through the army ranks to become an officer) and not a mektepli (a person who gets military school education and then enters the officer corps). At 16 years of age he volunteered in a division based in Montenegro. In 1866 he was based in Bosnia and was promoted to lieutenant and captain. He participated in the Russo-Turkish War (1877-1878) in which he was wounded.

In 1901 Shemsi, a favorite and trusted official of Abdul Hamid II, was appointed as commander of the 18th Infantry Division based in Mitroviçe (modern Mitrovica) that protected an important northern entry route into the empire. For seven years the 18th Division was under his command and the sultan came to rely on him as someone with ingenuity who could take care of local problems in the region of Kosovo. The Mektepli officers viewed him as a simple man with an old mindset while regular soldiers respected him as he came from their ranks and rose in the army based on demonstrated skills gained from experience. Shemsi was also the military envoy to the Ottoman inspector general based in Selanik (modern Thessaloniki).

In his career Shemsi had to deal with corrupt or incompetent officials in difficult circumstances. During February 1905 he attempted to remove Brigadier Javid Bey as mutasarrıf of İpek (modern Peja) for having caused problems due to disrespect toward Albanian customs and traditions. In Elbasan of May 1907 Shemsi placed blame for a small disturbance on two bad officials who later got promoted for their disservice.

=== 1907–08 religious conflict in Kosovo ===
Religious conflict between Muslims and Catholics erupted in villages around Yakova (modern Gjakovë) and Shemsi Pasha was sent to bring order to the area, as he was in charge of resolving conflicts in Kosovo. An Albanian, Süleyman Külçe, the adjutant and personal secretary of Shemsi thought that Abdul Hamid II was mistaken in selecting officers whom lacked an education like the General for resolving problems of the area. During the start of the Muslim religious holiday Bayram, Shemsi got a telegram in early September 1907 about an incident in Smolicë regarding the profanation of the village mosque with a dead pig. The Italian consul in Kosovo thought it was a reaction by Catholics to the kidnapping of a Catholic priest held captive in Smolicë by Muslims, a first time act by them in the area and tensions rapidly rose between both religious communities. Edith Durham, a British traveler present in the region commented that the priest was held by Muslims whom demanded that Ottoman authorities release a relative of one of the captors in exchange for the hostage.

In short time Shemsi told the local Islamic clergy to soften the reactions of Muslims and stated to them that the pig's dead body did not profane the mosque and ordered the people responsible for the incident be found. In January 1908, an order was received by Shemsi to go with soldiers to Yakova. Later at the town Shemsi was met by a Catholic priest who passed on a letter about local Christians having been killed in the area. Shemsi then assembled Muslim notables of Yakova and the wider area and said that most Catholics subjected to attacks were innocent. Troops were left in the town after Shemsi departed. During his time in Yakova, Shemsi received a telegraph from Prizren about a mosque profanation incident. The General dismissed the claim as being untrue due to the discovery of the pig being in the river.

Tensions continued in the region and the sultan thought that the events in Kosovo had supposed links to Ismail Kemal and his activities. Abdul Hamid II instructed Shemsi to travel to Prizren and tasked him with appeasing Muslims and protecting Christians. Shemsi was unable to break and stop a besa (pledge) which targeted Catholics through boycotts. Religious tensions continued as the boycott spread and some Catholics fearing a loss of employment converted to Islam while Shemsi also met with the leadership of the remaining Catholics in the area. During these events Catholics had sought protection with Ottoman forces and after Shemsi withdrew his troops from the countryside incidents of violence against them occurred.

Another conflict in 1908 occurred in Yakova between local chieftains and the Curri family with Shemsi instructed to resolve the dispute. The Curri family refused an invitation for negotiations with the General. Shemsi assembled all the Catholic and Muslim notables in April. He convinced all sides to sign an agreement which stated an end to persecution of the peasantry, that trade would be unhindered and concerns held by people would be brought to government officials and not consuls of foreign powers. In the agreement Shemsi attempted to sever the links between Christians and the Great Powers through use of Ottoman government channels for conflict resolution. The General also requested that Muslims not give a pretext for foreign intervention into the region.

In Kosovo the Austro-Hungarian vice-consul was of the view that the attitude of Shemsi did not assist in resolving the conflict as he arrived with soldiers representing the authority of the government and did nothing to halt events. Külçe, Shemsi's secretary also commented that the General was unable to apply policy as suggested by the Grand Vezir and Inspector General due to the stance of the local Vali who was more in line with the sultan's position of not intervening against Muslims. The position of Shemsi was also undermined according to Külçe as the General brought soldiers and did not use them. Toward the end of June the situation was not settled and Shemsi had to go back to Prizren.

Shemsi was seen by Abdul Hamid II as a political and loyal General who could maintain a certain amount of order in Kosovo through his connections with Northern (Gheg) Albanians and notables of the area and functioned as the sultan's cultural intermediary. As division commander Shemsi had easy and direct access to the place. During the Albanian revolts of the time Shemsi undertook important services as a General for Abdul Hamid II. Even with Shemsi's presence in Kosovo, parts of the region and the porous frontier with Serbia continued to be a security problem for the Ottoman Empire. His intervention in conflicts within Kosovo were part of the wider geopolitical situation encompassing the region and Ottoman Empire at the time.

=== Young Turk Revolution and death ===
On 3 July 1908 adjutant-major Ahmed Niyazi Bey deserted the Ottoman army, fled into the mountains with a guerrilla band and initiated the Young Turk Revolution calling for the restoration of the constitution of 1876 with other officers like Enver Bey following his example. During that summer Shemsi encouraged a pro-government gathering at Firzovik (modern Ferizaj) and subsequent events at the meeting took an unexpected turn when demands for constitutional restoration were made. To deal with the revolt of Niyazi, Enver and other guerilla bands formed by deserting Ottoman soldiers, the government called up fresh reserve battalions from Aydin province with Abdul Hamid II placing them under Shemsi's command upon their arrival in the Balkans. Shemsi at Prizren was telegraphed by the palace First Chamberlain and told to gather local troops during the wait for the Anatolian soldiers and to march his combined force against the insurgents. Half an hour later a second cable was received by Shemsi from the sultan. Abdul Hamid II instructed Shemsi to take as many regiments as he wanted from the Mitroviçe Division and gather as many volunteers as he was able and dress them in uniform to act against the insurgents without waiting for the Anatolian troops to arrive.

Moving quickly Shemsi got two mobilised battalions from the Mitroviçe Division to board a train for Monastir (modern Bitola). He managed to draft a small group of Albanian volunteers into a unit, told them that Muslims were being massacred by Christians and that they would be fighting them. Niyazi accused Shemsi of making such comments against Christians to mobilise Albanian volunteers against the Young Turks (CUP). After the revolution Müfid Shemsi, a CUP member, an aide de camp to the General and son of Shemsi wrote in a book that his father never made that declaration and he protected Christians from injustices done by Muslims. Shemsi telegraphed Albanian notables for assistance to fight against the insurgents.

On 7 July 1908, Shemsi with his small unit of Albanian volunteers and two army battalions reached Monastir by train. Shemsi lacked hard intelligence about the location of Niyazi's guerrilla band and he planned to travel to Resne (modern Resen) and conduct his operations from there. The Young Turks (CUP) viewed Shemsi and his military forces as superior to their bands and that any clash between them and Ottoman military forces composed of Albanian soldiers and volunteers would damage Albanian-CUP relations. The CUP Monastir branch took the decision to assassinate Shemsi before he would begin his military campaign. The first lieutenant Atıf Kamçıl, a member of the "self-sacrificing volunteer division" of the CUP Monastir branch wrote later in life that he alone decided to assassinate Shemsi, and had talks about the matter with branch guide Süleyman Askerî, and a branch telegram stated that "a self sacrificing" volunteer undertook the task alone. During his stopover in Monastir Shemsi telegraphed the palace and exchanged messages with the First Chamberlain giving them advice to mobilise those Albanian chiefs that were for years under imperial patronage and to fight the revolting officers. As he left the telegraph office and went to enter the carriage Shemsi was assassinated in front of his Albanian bodyguards on July 7 by Atıf Kamçıl. Kamçıl, as he fled from the location was wounded in the leg. The Albanian bodyguards of Shemsi had been swayed by the CUP to their side that during the incident they only shot their firearms into the air, did not chase after Kamçıl and later fled from the scene themselves.

For the revolution the murder of Shemsi was a turning point that demoralised the palace and it removed a dangerous opponent for the CUP that could have mobilised Albanians against their forces. Lieutenant-colonel Re'fet Bey, the son-in-law of Shemsi and gendarme commander of Monastir was ordered to pursue the insurgents with the military forces gathered by his father-in-law. Unknown to the government was that Re'fet Bey was a CUP member and that the CUP Monastir branch told him to stall for time while CUP leaders understood that forces assembled by Shemsi would not conduct an attack. After his death Shemsi was replaced with Marshal Osman Tatar Pasha and the CUP gained a major advantage in the conflict as the assassination galvanised people to their cause. During these events Ismail Mahir Pasha, a relative of Shemsi was also assassinated. Facing a deteriorating situation in the Balkans on July 24 sultan Abdul Hamid II restored the constitution of 1876. Following the revolution people involved in the assassinations went unpunished by the CUP and instead they were hailed as heroes and given important positions within the state.

== Sources ==
- Clayer, Natalie (2011). "The dimension of confessionalisation in the Ottoman Balkans at the time of Nationalisms". In Hannes, Grandits; Clayer, Nathalie; Pichler, Robert (eds.). Conflicting Loyalties in the Balkans: The Great Powers, the Ottoman Empire and Nation-building. IB Tauris. ISBN 9781848854772.
- Gawrych, George (2006). The Crescent and the Eagle: Ottoman rule, Islam and the Albanians, 1874–1913. London: IB Tauris. ISBN 9781845112875.
- Halilović, Enes (11 May 2022). "Из историје Ибарског Колашина: Добро срце и жестока рука Шемси-паше Бишевца, од Рожаја до Стамбола". RTS.
- Hanioğlu, M. Șükrü (2001). Preparation for a Revolution: The Young Turks, 1902-1908. Oxford University Press. ISBN 9780199771110.
- Zarković, Vesna S. (2023). "Štampa na nemačkom jeziku o delovanju Šemsi paše Biševca u Kosovskom vilajetu". Baština. 61: 309–25. doi:10.5937/bastina33-47816.
- Özdemir, Hakan (2013), Towards the Revolution of 1908: The Assassination of Şemsi Paşa, Fatih University
