= M. Şükrü Hanioğlu =

Turkish historian

M. Şükrü Hanioğlu is a Turkish professor of late Ottoman history in the Department of Near Eastern Studies at Princeton University. Between 2005 and 2014, he was the department chair. Currently, he is an associated faculty member at Princeton's History and the Practice of Diplomacy Program.

== Education ==
He received his B.A. in political science and economics and his Ph.D. in political science from Istanbul University. His thesis was on the political activities and thought of one of the founders of the Committee of Union and Progress (CUP), Dr. Abdullah Cevdet.

== Research ==
He has done extensive research on the history of the CUP during the period from 1889 to 1908, i.e. from its foundation to the Young Turk Revolution using organization's own papers (since it was an underground organization), archival sources including those found in the Turkish, German, Austrian, French, Swiss, Italian, Greek, and British archives. He was also the first foreign scholar to visit the national archives of Albania, during the period when hardly anyone could visit the country.

== Representative publications ==
- Bir siyasal düşünür olarak Doktor Abdullah Cevdet ve Dönemi, Istanbul, 1981
- Bir siyasal örgüt olarak Osmanlı Ittihad ve Terakki Cemiyeti ve Jon Türklük, Istanbul, 1986
- Young Turks in Opposition, Oxford University Press, 1995
- Preparation for a Revolution: The Young Turks, 1902–1908, Oxford University Press, 2001
- Brief History of the Late Ottoman Empire, Princeton, 2008
- "Transformation of the Ottoman intelligentsia and the idea of science," Anuarul Institutului de Istorie si Arheologie A.D., Xenopol, 1987
- "Notes on the Young Turks and the Freemasons," Middle Eastern Studies, 25 (1989)
- "Der Jungtürkenkongress von Paris (1902) und seine Ergebnisse," Die Welt des Islams 33 (1993)
- "Transformation of the Ottoman intelligentsia and the idea of science," Anuarul Institutului de Istorie si Arheologie A.D., Xenopol, 1987
