= Alban Meha =

Kosovar footballer (born 1986)

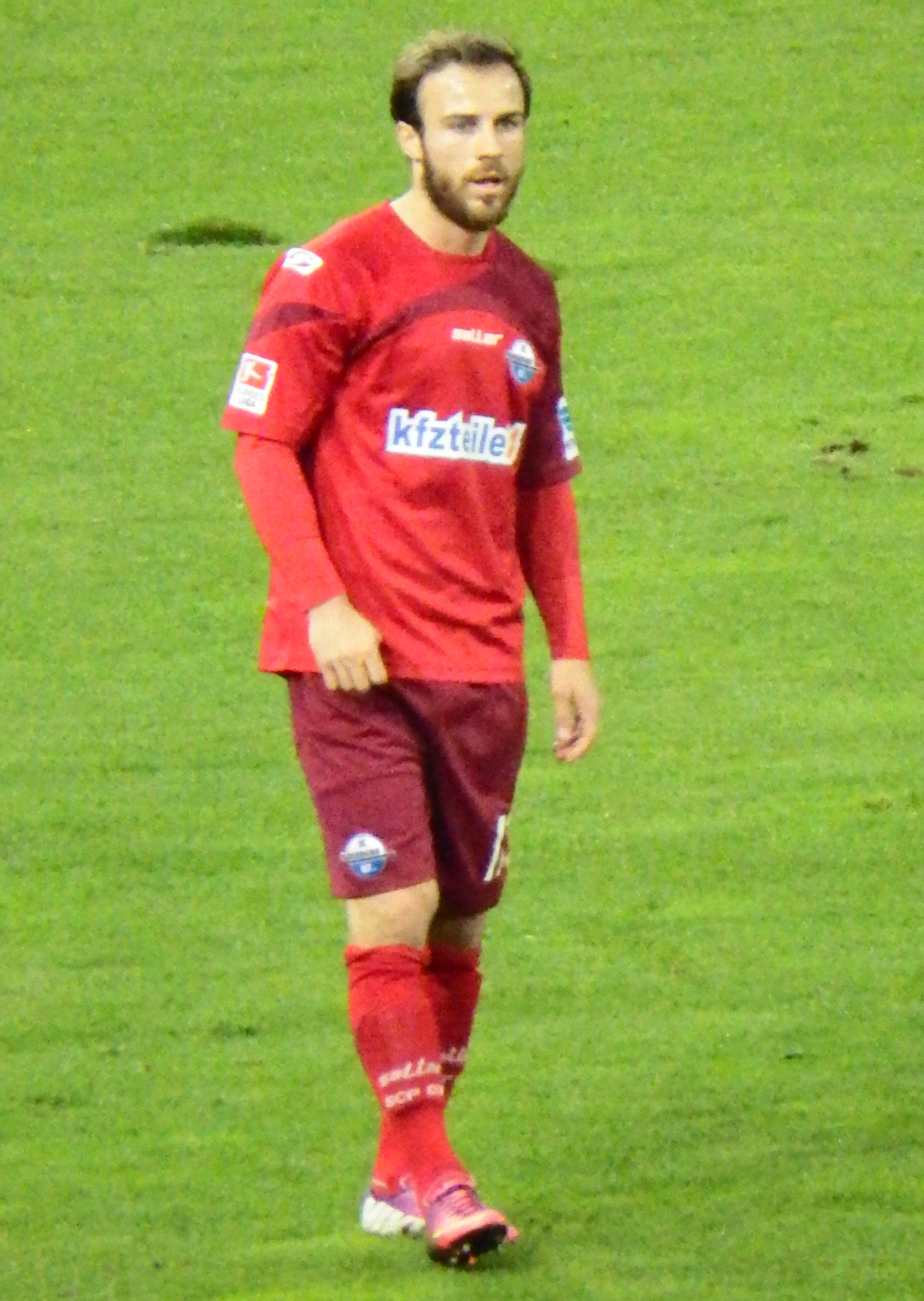
- Meha with SC Paderborn in 2013

Personal information
- Full name: Alban Sylë Meha
- Date of birth: 26 April 1986 (age 40)
- Place of birth: Mitrovica, SFR Yugoslavia (present-day Kosovo)
- Height: 1.74 m (5 ft 9 in)
- Position: Midfielder

Team information
- Current team: CSC 03 Kassel (player); Hessen Kassel (assistant)
- Number: 17

Youth career
- TV Kemnat 1890
- –1995: SV 1845 Esslingen
- 1995–2005: Stuttgarter Kickers

Senior career*
Years	Team	Apps	(Gls)
2005	Stuttgarter Kickers II		
2006–2007	VfL Kirchheim/Teck	54	(16)
2007–2010	SSV Reutlingen	79	(16)
2010–2011	Eintracht Trier	33	(15)
2011–2015	SC Paderborn	102	(26)
2015–2017	Konyaspor	39	(4)
2017–2018	Al-Faisaly		
2018–2019	SV Elversberg	13	(2)
2019–2021	Hessen Kassel	56	(17)
2023–2024	Hessen Kassel	32	(10)
2025–	CSC 03 Kassel	10	(8)

International career^{‡}
2012–2016	Albania	7	(2)
2016	Kosovo	2	(0)

Managerial career
- 2024–: Hessen Kassel (assistant)
- * Club domestic league appearances and goals as of 30 April 2024 ‡ National team caps and goals as of 9 October 2016

Alban Sylë Meha (born 26 April 1986) is a Kosovan professional footballer and football manager who plays as a midfielder for the Hessenliga club CSC 03 Kassel and serves as the assistant manager of Regionalliga Südwest club Hessen Kassel.

== Early life ==
Meha was born in Mitrovica, SFR Yugoslavia to Albanian parents from Prekaz i Epërm, Kosovo. He is the grandson of Tahir Meha and the great-grandson of Nebih Meha, Albanian rights activists who resisted the Yugoslav People's Army and police forces until they were killed in 1981. His older brother Feriz Meha is a semi-professional footballer who last played as a forward for the German-based Albanian diaspora club SC Drita Kosova Kornwestheim.

== Club career ==
=== Youth career ===
In his youth, Meha joined the local teams TV Kemnat 1890 and SV 1845 Esslingen.

=== Stuttgarter Kickers ===
When Meha was nine years old, he joined the Stuttgarter Kickers and remained in the junior side for ten years. When Meha turned 19, he officially signed for the senior team. In July 2005, Meha joined the senior team of Stuttgarter Kickers. However, he remained on the reserve squad and never made an appearance on the first team.

=== VfL Kirchheim ===
In December 2005, Meha moved to VfL Kirchheim and played one and a half seasons at Kirchheim, making 54 appearances and scoring 16 goals.

=== SSV Reutlingen ===
Meha played three seasons at Reutlingen, making 82 appearances and scoring 16 goals. He then moved to Eintracht Trier.

=== Eintracht Trier ===
Meha played one season for Eintracht Trier, making a total of 33 appearances, scoring 15 goals and providing 16 assists. He helped the club win the Rhineland Cup and helped the club come second in the 2010–11 season in the Regionalliga West. He then moved to SC Paderborn.

=== SC Paderborn ===
==== 2012–13 season ====
On 13 August 2012, Paderborn coach Stephan Schmidt declared that Meha was "an extremely important player for Paderborn". He returned after a break, scoring at the start of the season's second half on 10 February 2013, when Meha scored in the 87th minute from a difficult angle to the top right-hand corner of the goal in a 3–1 away victory against FC Ingolstadt. A week later on 15 February 2013, Meha scored, by penalty spot, the last goal of the 2–0 victory in the 40th minute against Erzgebirge Aue. He also participated in the opening goal in a free kick that was avoided by the goalkeeper and the ball was then sent into the goal by Tobias Feisthammel in the 20th minute. The last goal of the 2012–13 season was scored on 3 May 2013 against Dynamo Dresden in the 2–1 away loss.

Meha finished the 2012–13 season with 26 appearances and six goals. Three goals were scored from penalties, two from free kicks and one goal against FC Ingolstadt. Meha also made five assists in his second season with Paderborn, which finished in 12th place on the rank table.

==== 2013–14 season ====
On 18 October 2013, Meha scored the first goal of the 2013–14 season; in the 54th minute he scored the last goal of the 4–2 victory against FSV Frankfurt. On 8 December 2013, he scored two goals in 4–2 away victory against Aalen; Meha scored in the 12th minute and in the 72nd minute. He debuted in 2014 with a goal on 9 February 2014; he scored a free-kick goal in the 47th minute, giving an away victory to Paderborn against Köln (1–0). In his next fixture match on 16 February 2014 against Arminia Bielefeld, Meha scored a goal in the victory 4–0. He scored again for the third consecutive game on 22 February 2014 against 1860 München, which finished in a 2–2 draw; Meha scored the second goal for 2–0 in the 18th minute.

On 28 February, Meha scored two more goals in the next match against VfL Bochum to help his team win the match 4–1. On 17 March 2014 Meha was honoured as "player of the month for February" for scoring five goals in four matches. Meha scored on 25 March 2014 against St. Pauli in a home victory 3–0. He continued his scoring form on 4 April 2014 when he scored a free kick in a 2–1 loss against Fortuna Düsseldorf. Meha captained Paderborn's team for the first time on 27 April 2014 in the match against Sandhausen, which finished as a 2–0 victory in which he played the full 90 minutes.

On 4 May 2014, Meha scored in the away victory 2–0 over Erzgebirge Aue; Meha scored the opening goal in the 35th minute. On the last day of the second division campaign, Paderborn came from behind to win 2–1 over VfR Aalen to secure automatic promotion to the Bundesliga, their first ever promotion to the Bundesliga. Meha finished the 2013–14 season with 26 appearances, including one in the German Cup, scoring 12 goals during campaign where he ranked in sixth place, equal with Charlison Benschop, Patrick Helmes and Torsten Mattuschka in the 2. Bundesliga all goalscorers. Meha was voted as the best player of the season for Paderborn, giving a special contribution in the team success of the promotion for the first time in their history.

On 1 August 2014, Meha suffered an injury during a friendly match against Maccabi Haifa and was forced to undergo surgery, which according to doctors would keep him from playing for eight weeks.

==== 2014–15 season ====
Due to the injury of the previous season, Alban Meha missed out the start of the 2014–15 season for five weeks.

On 27 September 2014, Meha debuted in the Bundesliga, playing in the sixth game week against Borussia Mönchengladbach, coming on as a substitute in the 78th minute in place of Lukas Rupp in a 2–1 loss. On 2 November 2014, Meha scored his first goal for Paderborn that season in a 3–1 home win against Hertha BSC. He scored from a powerful strike from the edge of the penalty area. On 14 December 2014, Meha scored from the penalty spot to give his team a 1–1 draw against the second-ranking team Wolfsburg at their home. Meha scored a goal from a free kick against Hannover 96 on 15 February 2015 to give his team the 2–1 away victory, coming from behind at 1–0 as Hannover 96 scored in the 66th minute with Marcelo then Srdjan Lakic of Paderborn scored the equalising 1–1 goal in the 72nd minute. Meha scored in the 79th minute to secure the win. It was his first goal of 2015 and he played a full 90-minute match.

=== Konyaspor ===
Following the relegation of Paderborn to the 2. Bundesliga, on 9 June 2015, Meha moved to Turkish Süper Lig side Konyaspor on a free transfer. After having spent his entire career in Germany, the move to Turkey was his first abroad. He signed a one-year contract with Konyaspor that included a one-year extension option. According to media reports he earns up to €1 million per season.

Meha made his Süper Lig debut on 16 August 2015 in the 2015–16 Süper Lig opening match against Akhisar Belediyespor, playing the full 90-minute match. He scored his first goal in the third match on 29 August 2015 against the defending champions Galatasaray with a free-kick for the 1–1 equaliser, but it was not enough; Galatasaray scored three more goals to take the 4–1 victory. In the next match on 13 September 2015 Meha scored against Osmanlıspor in the 61st minute of the match to make the score 2–1 and to sign away victory.

=== Al-Faisaly ===
On 24 December 2017, Meha joined Jordan Premier League side Al-Faisaly. On 15 January 2018, the club confirmed that Meha had joined the team. On 24 January 2018, he made his debut in a 2–0 away win against Al-Yarmouk after being named in the starting line-up.

== International career ==
=== Albania ===
In summer 2012, Meha expressed his desire to play for Albania and that he had been in contact with national coach Gianni de Biasi. On 26 August 2012, it was reported that Meha had been invited to play for Albania in the September match against Cyprus, valid for the qualifiers of the FIFA World Cup 2014. On 4 September 2012, he received Albanian citizenship alongside fellow new member of the national team Burim Kukeli to be able to play for Albania. On 7 September 2012, Meha made his first international debut for Albania and led the Albanian midfield in a 3–1 victory against Cyprus, where he assisted the opening goal scored by Armando Sadiku. On 7 October 2012, Meha assisted a goal scored by Edgar Çani in a 2–1 loss against Iceland, valid for the qualifiers of the FIFA World Cup 2014. On 26 March 2013, Meha scored first goal for Albania against Lithuania in a 4–1 win. The second international goal came a year later, on 5 March 2014, whene he scored a volley from 40 metres (130 ft) in a 2–0 win over Malta.

=== Kosovo ===
On 30 August 2016, Meha received a call-up from Kosovo for a 2018 FIFA World Cup qualification match against Finland and made his debut after coming on as a substitute at 89th minute in place of Valon Berisha.

== Career statistics ==
=== Club ===
As of 13 September 2015

Appearances and goals by club, season and competition
Club	Season	League			League Cup		Europe		Total	
Club	Season	Division	Apps	Goals	Apps	Goals	Apps	Goals	Apps	Goals
SSV Reutlingen	2007–08	Regionalliga Süd	28	1	0	0	–		28	1
SSV Reutlingen	2008–09	Regionalliga Süd	29	3	0	0	–		29	3
SSV Reutlingen	2009–10	Regionalliga Süd	27	12	0	0	–		27	12
SSV Reutlingen	Total		84	16	0	0	0	0	87	16
Eintracht Trier	2010–11	Regionalliga West	33	15	1	0	–		34	15
SC Paderborn	2011–12	2. Bundesliga	33	5	2	1	–		35	6
SC Paderborn	2012–13	2. Bundesliga	26	6	1	1	–		27	7
SC Paderborn	2013–14	2. Bundesliga	24	12	1	0	–		25	12
SC Paderborn	2014–15	Bundesliga	18	3	0	0	–		18	3
SC Paderborn	Total		102	26	4	2	0	0	106	28
Konyaspor	2015–16	Süper Lig	4	2	0	0	–		4	2
Career total			220	59	5	2	0	0	224	61

=== International ===
As of 9 October 2016

Appearances and goals by national team and year
National team	Year	Apps	Goals
Albania	2012	3	0
Albania	2013	2	1
Albania	2014	1	1
Albania	2015	1	0
Total		7	2
Kosovo	2016	2	0
Total		2	0

Scores and results list Albania's goal tally first, score column indicates score after each Meha goal.

List of international goals scored by Alban Meha
No.	Date	Venue	Opponent	Score	Result	Competition
1	26 March 2013	Qemal Stafa Stadium, Tirana, Albania	Lithuania	1–0	4–1	Friendly
2	5 March 2014	Niko Dovana Stadium, Durrës, Albania	Malta	2–0	2–0	Friendly

== Honours ==
Konyaspor

- Turkish Cup: 2016–17
