= Çitaku =

Çitaku is an Albanian surname. Notable people with the surname include:

- Gazmend Çitaku (born 1970), Albanian Montenegrin photographer, publisher, and librarian
- Gentrit Citaku (born 1996), Swedish footballer
- Ramadan Çitaku (1914–1990), Albanian politician
- Vlora Çitaku (born 1980), Kosovar-Albanian politician and diplomat
