= Zenel Beka Mill =

Cultural heritage monument of Kosovo

- Mulliri i Zenel Bekës (Albanian)
- Location: Kiqicë, Skenderaj, Kosovo

History
- Built: 18th century

The Zenel Beka Mill is a cultural heritage site in Kiqicë, Skenderaj, Kosovo, categorized by the government as “architectural.”

== History ==
The Beka family mill is located in the southern portion of the village of Kiqicë in the municipality of Skenderaj. According to the owner's records, it is approximately 300 years old.

Long a source of flour for the area, the watermill is built with stone walls featuring clay masonry, though some parts of the wall are wood-reinforced. The roof is wooden but lined with tile. The mill includes a guesthouse and a grinding room, the latter above the underground water sluice. Over the years, the building has remained well-preserved.
