= Banja, Skenderaj =

Bajë: Bajë (Albanian); Бања/Banja (Serbian)
- Village
- Location in Kosovo
- Coordinates: 42°48′51″N 20°40′21″E
- Location: Kosovo
- District: Mitrovicë
- Municipality: Skenderaj
- Elevation: 761 m (2,497 ft)

Population (2024)
  - Total: 363
- Time zone: UTC+1 (CET)
  - Summer (DST): UTC+2 (CEST)
- Area code: +381 290
- Car plates: 02

Banja (Banje; Serbian Cyrillic: Бања, Бање, Albanian: Bajë or Baja), or Banja Rudnička (Serbian Cyrillic: Бања Рудничка), is a settlement in the Skenderaj municipality in Kosovo. The rural settlement lies on a cadastral area with the same name, of 1033 hectares. The village has an Albanian majority.

== Geography ==
Banja is located circa 2 km from Runik, on the Pejë–Mitrovica road.

== History ==
Banja was mentioned for the first time in a charter of Serbian King Stefan Uroš I (r. 1243–1276), dating to the mid-13th century, granted (metochion) to the Gračanica monastery. It was then granted by King Stefan Milutin (r. 1282–1321) to the Banjska Monastery. The village church, dedicated to St. Nicholas, as founded by nobleman Rodop who served Serbian Despot Đurađ Branković (r. 1427–1456), and was buried here in 1436. Two bells found in its ruins are preserved in the Patriarchal Monastery of Peć and National Museum in Belgrade. Between 1936 and 1941 the church was renovated, but destroyed during World War II by Albanians. The village was among those in North Kosovo that was burned down by Albanian paramilitaries and the Serb population expelled. In 1971 the church was reconstructed. The church was used as a model for an Orthodox church in Norway.

On the night of 21 May 1998 a large number of Albanian Kosovo Liberation Army members of Drenica attacked the villages of Banja and Suvo Grlo (which are inhabited by Serbs) and a military station in Rudnik, above Skenderaj. Serbs and Serbian police answered the fire, no deaths or injuries were reported by them.

Demographic history
Ethnic group	1948	1953	1961	1971	1981	1991
Serbs					338	
Albanians					32	
Total	552	595	636	513	371	274

== Sources ==
- Kalezić, Dimitrije M. (2002). A - Z. Savremena administracija. p. 131. ISBN 9788638706716.
- Maletić, Mihailo (1937). Kosovo nekad i danas. p. 402.
- Ristanović, Slobodan (2005). Kroz Srbiju i Crnu Goru. КСЕ-НА. p. 690.
- Влада Републике Србије за Косово и Метохију. "Угрожена културна добра на Косову и Метохији" (PDF). srbija.gov.rs.
- "Црква Св. Николе". Spomenici kulture.
- "Čudesno selo Banje: U srcu Drenice, Srbija u srcu". KoSSev.
- "САДА НАМ ЈЕ НАЈТЕЖЕ!". Srpska.
