= Nebih Meha =

Albanian political activist

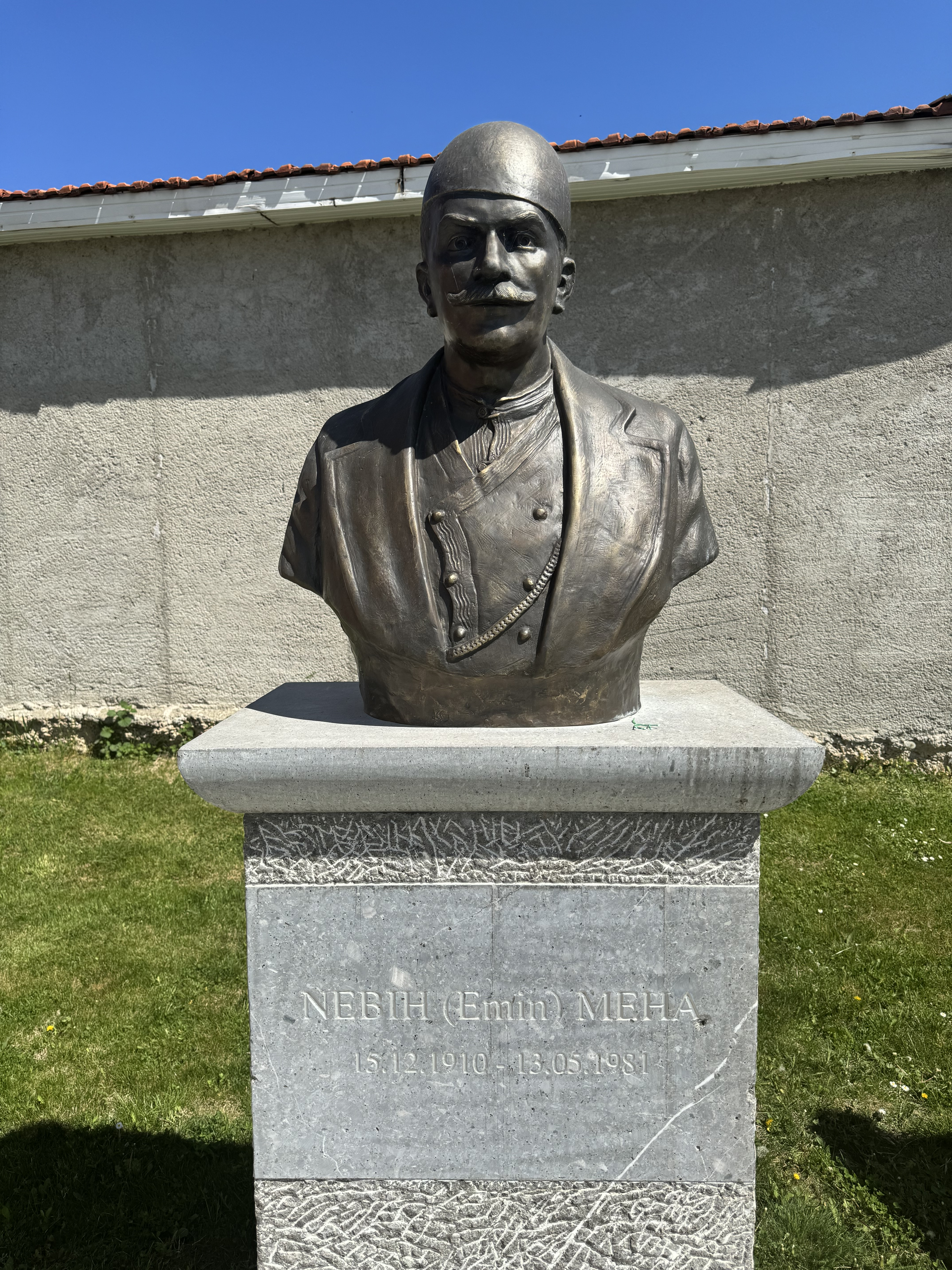
- Bust of Nebih Meha.
- Born: December 15, 1910; Prekaz i Epërm, Skënderaj, Kosovo Vilayet (part of the Ottoman Empire)
- Died: May 13, 1981 (aged 70); Prekaz i Epërm, Skënderaj, SFR Yugoslavia (present-day Kosovo)
- Children: Tahir Meha
- Father: Emin Lati

Nebih Meha (December 15, 1910 – May 13, 1981) was a Kosovar Albanian soldier. He died on 13 May 1981 along with his son Tahir Meha, following an armed confrontation with Yugoslav authorities at their residence.

== Biography ==
Nebih Meha was born on December 15, 1910, during a period of significant upheaval in Kosovo, as the region transitioned from Ottoman to Serbian rule. During World War II, he participated in battles led by Shaban Polluzha.

On 13 May 1981, Yugoslav forces surrounded the family home of Nebih and his son Tahir Meha, demanding Tahir’s surrender due to his resistance activities against the regime. Refusing to yield, Nebih stood by his son in armed resistance. In the siege which reportedly lasted 17 hours, both father and son were killed.
