= Malush Ahmeti =

Kosovo Liberation Army soldier

- Born: 16 November 1951; Rezallë, Skënderaj, FPR Yugoslavia (today Kosovo)
- Died: 15 May 1999 (aged 47); Mountains near Rezallë, FR Yugoslavia (today Kosovo)
- Military career
- Allegiance: Kosova
- Branch: Kosovo Liberation Army
- Service years: 1995–1999
- Rank: Commander
- Conflicts: Insurgency in Kosovo (1995–98) Kosovo War: KLA Summer offensive (1998); March 1999 offensive in Drenica; Second Battle of Rezalla †
- Awards: Hero of Kosovo (posthumously)

Malush Ahmeti (16 November 1951 – 15 May 1999) was a notable commander of the Kosovo Liberation Army, who died during a battle against Serbian forces, he played a key role in organizing the armed resistance, providing arms, and leading military operations and is also considered as one of the closest comrades of Adem Jashari.

== Early life ==
Malush Ahmeti was born on November 16, 1951, in the village of Rezallë, Skënderaj. He grew up in a poor and nationalist family known for its dedication to the struggle for Kosovo’s freedom. Ahmeti completed his elementary education in his village, but due to financial difficulties, he could not continue his higher education in Skënderaj. As a young man, he demonstrated significant skills in metalworking and precision craftsmanship. He developed a deep passion for firearms and motorcycles.

== Involvement in the Kosovo Liberation Army ==
=== Early resistance ===
In 1991 and 1992, he began producing homemade firearms and his underground workshop became a valuable resource for the growing resistance, although Serbian authorities eventually discovered it. In 1997, Serbian police raided his home in Rezallë, confiscating his tools and several weapons he had manufactured, including a custom-made six-shot carbine. Although sentenced to six months in prison in absentia, Ahmeti avoided capture and continued his covert operations, becoming a key figure in the local resistance. He then became a close friend of Adem Jashari and before the Prekaz Massacre, Ahmeti was the only trusted mechanic for the weapons and motorcycles used by the Jashari Family and other KLA members.

=== During the war ===
As the Kosovo Liberation Army grew, Malush Ahmeti, along with his two sons, Bedri and Bahri, officially joined its ranks in early 1998. His home in Rezallë became a vital base for KLA fighters, including Adem Jashari and his fellow fighters. Ahmeti was responsible for repairing the weapons used by the KLA’s fighters. The KLA fighters often sought his skills for fixing various malfunctions in their arms, and his underground workshop continued to operate despite the constant threat of Serbian Police raids.

Ahmeti was deeply involved in the logistics of the KLA, playing a crucial role in transporting arms and supplies. His son Bahri, along with other fighters, frequently smuggled arms and ammunition from Albania to support the KLA’s operations in Drenica. Ahmeti's house was also a key meeting point and base for KLA operations, making it a target for Serbian forces during their offensives.

Ahmeti fought in several battles throughout the war, including battles in the Shala Operative Zone of the KLA or the villages of Jashanicë and Morinë. In September 1998, during a large-scale Serbian offensive aimed at penetrating KLA strongholds in Drenica, Ahmeti led the defense of Rezallë. Serbian forces attempted to enter the village from multiple directions, but Ahmeti and his comrades repelled their advances. During this offensive, on September 11, 1998, Serbian mortar shelling hit the Ahmeti family’s yard. Ahmeti’s seven-year-old son, Leotrim, was killed by the shell, while his eighteen-year-old daughter, Fatmirja, sustained serious injuries.

Following Leotrim’s death, Ahmeti engaged in several more key battles, including the defense of the villages of Shalë and Llapushnik. He led the KLA forces in repelling a Serbian armored unit near the village of Morinë. His tactics, which included using a mix of artillery and smaller arms, inflicted heavy losses on Serbian forces.

His logistical and tactical contributions were vital to sustaining the KLA’s resistance, particularly during the winter of 1999 when Serbian forces launched a general offensive. Days before the NATO bombing campaign, an offensive took place in Drenica. From 24 March 1999 to 15 May 1999, a Second Battle occurred in the village of Rezallë. KLA Forces under Malush Ahmeti and Ilaz Dërguti led the defense of Rezallë. On 24 March 1999, at 8:10 p.m., after the first NATO attack on Yugoslavia began, directed at several military targets, the Yugoslav forces had begun to attack the KLA in the villages of Rezallë, Marinë and Polluzhe. The KLA forces, and especially the II and III companies of the 113th Brigade, defended the villages of Marinë, Rezallë, and Polluzhe. KLA forces were also joined by soldiers of the 114th Brigade, "Fehmi Lladrovci". On the same day, since 8:30 a.m., fighters like Alush Istogu and Murat Kukaj have been in positions in the village of Polluzhë. For seven weeks up until 15 May 1999, the KLA successfully defended Rezalla and the surrounding villages and made it impossible for Serbian troops to penetrate or capture the area despite Malush Ahmeti‘s death on 15 May.

== Death ==
On May 15, 1999, Malush Ahmeti and his comrades were positioned in the mountains near Rezallë, attempting to hold off Serbian forces that were advancing from multiple directions. At around 8 a.m., Serbian artillery began shelling their positions. Ahmeti was in the process of coordinating with fellow KLA commanders when a mortar shell exploded near his location. Despite the efforts of his comrades, including his son Bahri, who attempted to reach him, Ahmeti was struck and killed by a direct hit from a 122-millimeter howitzer.

== Legacy ==
Amongst Kosovar Albanians, Malush Ahmeti's story and personal sacrifices, including the loss of his seven-year-old son Leotrim during the war, have been viewed as emblematic of the war. On the 19th anniversary of his death, Malush Ahmeti was posthumously awarded the title of "Hero of Kosovo" by the President of Kosovo, Hashim Thaçi and additionally the primary school, which he attended as a child, in his home village of Rezallë and a street were renamed in his honor.

In 2024, on the 25th occasion of Skënderaj's liberation, a sculpture of Leotrim Ahmeti, the seven-year-old son of Malush Ahmeti who was killed by Serbian mortar shelling, was unveiled. The memorial event honored both the liberation of the city from Serbian forces and the memory of those who sacrificed their lives. Leotrim represents the innocent victims of the conflict.
