= Leçinë =

Leçinë: Leçinë (Albanian); Леочина/Leočina (Serbian)
- Village
- Location in Kosovo
- Location: Kosovo
- District: Mitrovicë
- Municipality: Skënderaj
- Elevation: 702 m (2,303 ft)

Population (2024)
  - Total: 561
- Time zone: UTC+1 (CET)
  - Summer (DST): UTC+2 (CEST)

Leçinë (Serbian: Leočina) is a settlement in the Skenderaj municipality in Kosovo. The rural settlement lies on a cadastral area with the same name, of 784 hectares. It lies 702 m over sea level. The village is solely inhabited by Albanians.

== Geography ==
It lies in the hilly region of Drenica.

== History ==
The Church of St. John, which lies on the cemetery, was built in the village in the 14th century, and reconstructed in the 16th century. Until latter the half of the 19th century it was known as the Church of St. Nicholas. It was expertly conserved and reconstructed in 1967 and is protected by the Republic of Serbia. There exist remains of another 14th-century church, the so-called "Kaluđerska-" or "Preobraška crkva" and one more church, a total of three.

On the night of May 19, 1998, members of the Albanian Kosovo Liberation Army kidnapped Dostan Šmigić (aged 41), a worker in the institute for labour market in Skenderaj, on the Čitak-Leočina road and took him to an unknown location.

Demographic history
Ethnic group	1948	1953	1961	1971	1981	1991
Albanians					875	
Serbs					119	
Total	511	547	652	841	994	1069

== Sources ==
- "Преобрашка-Калуђерска црква". Споменици културе у Србији.
- "Црква Св. Јована". Споменици културе у Србији.
- Tatomir Vukanović, Drenica: The Second Serbian Holy Mountain, III Edition, Public and University Library "Ivo Andrić" (Priština), Mnemosyne Center, Belgrade 2005; anthropogeographical and ethnological field research conducted by ethnologist Tatomir Vukanović (1907-1997) between 1934 and 1937.
