= Devič =

Serbian Orthodox monastery near Skenderaj, Kosovo

Devič Monastery
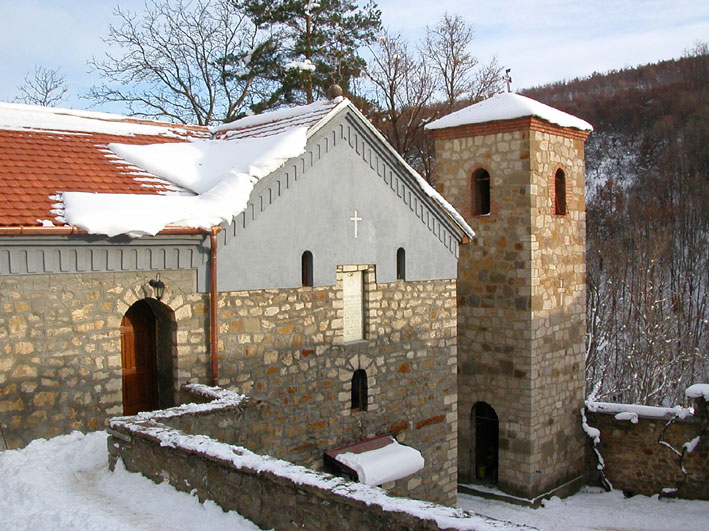
- Devič Monastery reconstruction after it was burned down in 2004
- Interactive map of Devič Monastery

Monastery information
- Full name: Манастир Девич
- Other name: Manastiri i Deviçit
- Order: Serbian Orthodox
- Established: 1434
- Dedication: St. Joanikije of Devič
- Diocese: Eparchy of Raška and Prizren

People
- Founder: Despot Đurađ Branković
- Important associated figures: Đurađ Branković; Patriarch Makarije; Euphemia the Nun

Architecture
- Heritage designation: Cultural monument of Exceptional Importance
- Designated date: 24 March 1948

Site
- Location: Skenderaj, Drenica, Kosovo
- Public access: Limited

The Devič Monastery (Serbian: Манастир Девич, romanized: Manastir Devič; Albanian: Manastiri i Deviçit) is a Serbian Orthodox abbey in Kosovo. It was built in 1434 and is dedicated to St Joanikije of Devič. Devič was declared Monument of Culture of Exceptional Importance in 1990.

== History ==
The founder of the monastery is Despot Đurađ Branković, who had it built in memory of his daughter. In the Ottoman census from 1455, the monastery is mentioned as the church of the Theotokos (dedicated to The Entry of the Most Holy Theotokos into the Temple). During Turkish occupation the monastery was pulled down, but the church and the site with the grave of St. Joanikije was reconstructed, and was painted in 1578.

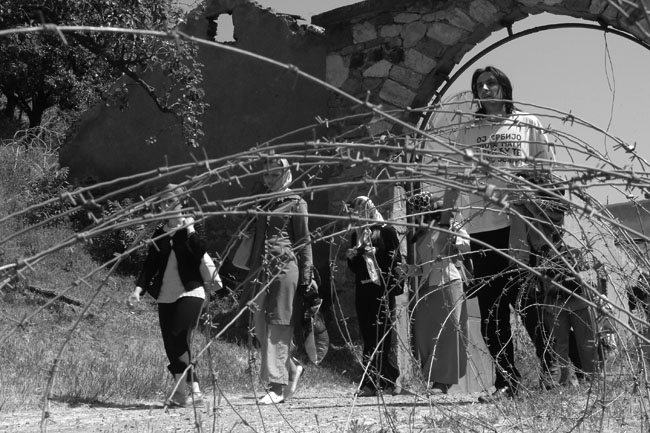
Serbs leaving monastery after 2004 unrest

The monastery was destroyed and burnt down during World War II in 1941 by forces of the Albanian Fascist Party, the prior Damaskin Bošković was killed, and Italian troops disassembled the two big bells and took them away in 1942. It was rebuilt in 1947.

Devič was a target of the Kosovo Liberation Army (KLA) in 1999. The monastery was vandalized and all food and two cars were stolen. The marble tomb of the patron saint St. Joannicius of Devič was desecrated by local Albanian in June 1999. Since then it has been under the constant protection of French KFOR troops.

It was the target of new attacks by Albanians in the most serious unrest in Kosovo on 18 March 2004 when the nuns were evacuated for safety reasons by Danish KFOR troops. Following that the monastery was pillaged and torched. The Serbian Orthodox Church received confirmation of the monastery's plight the following day from the United Nations Interim Administration Mission in Kosovo (UNMIK).

== Gallery ==
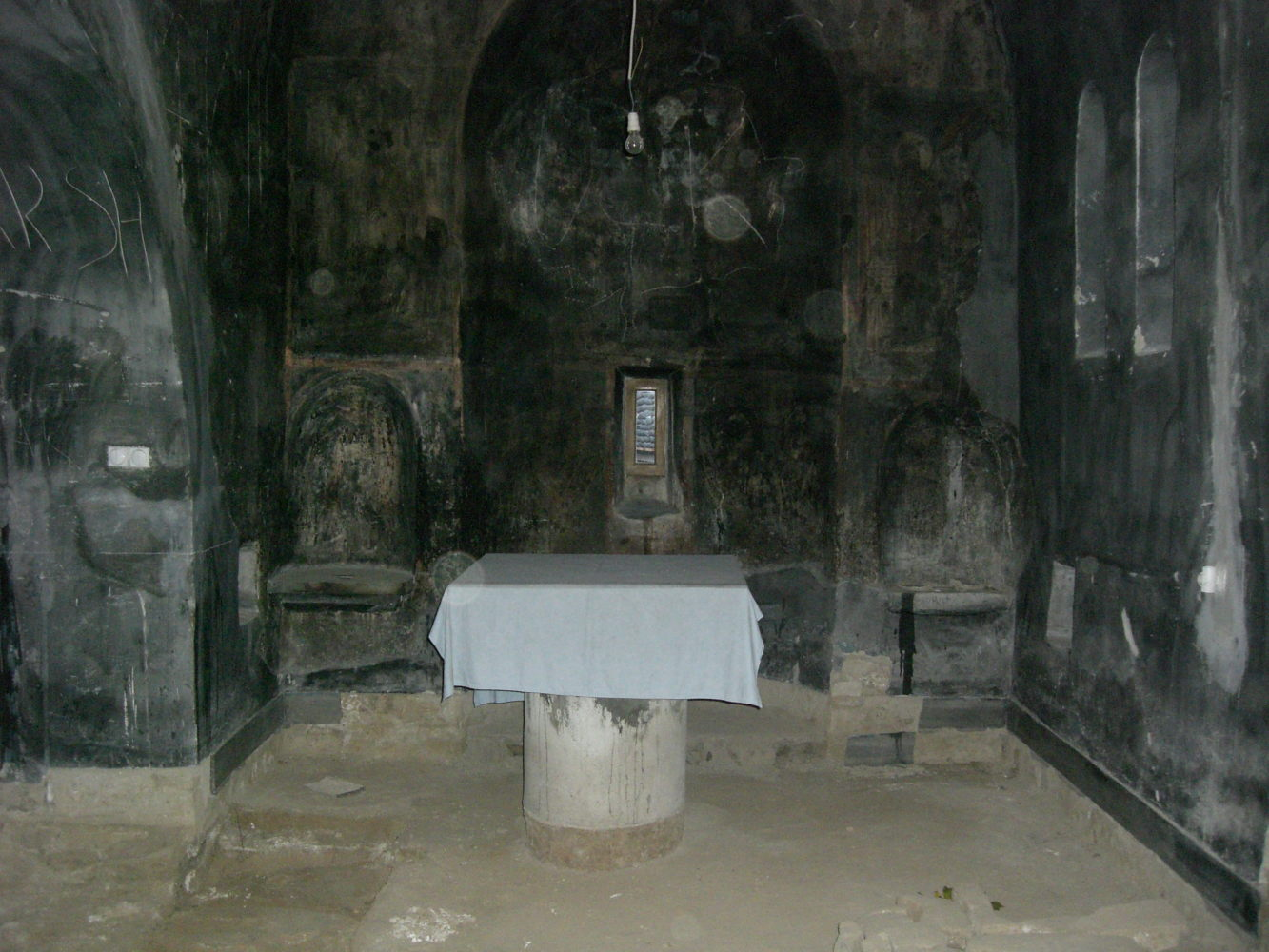
Burned and desecrated interior of the Devič. Note UÇK graffiti in the church apse.

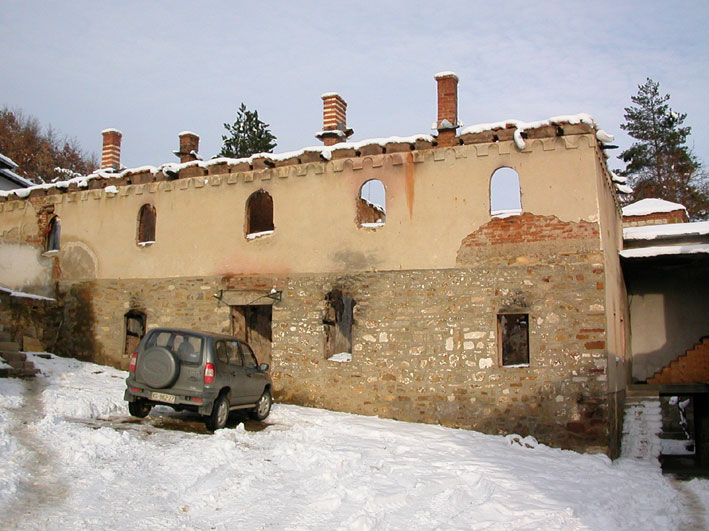
Burned monastery lodgings covered in snow

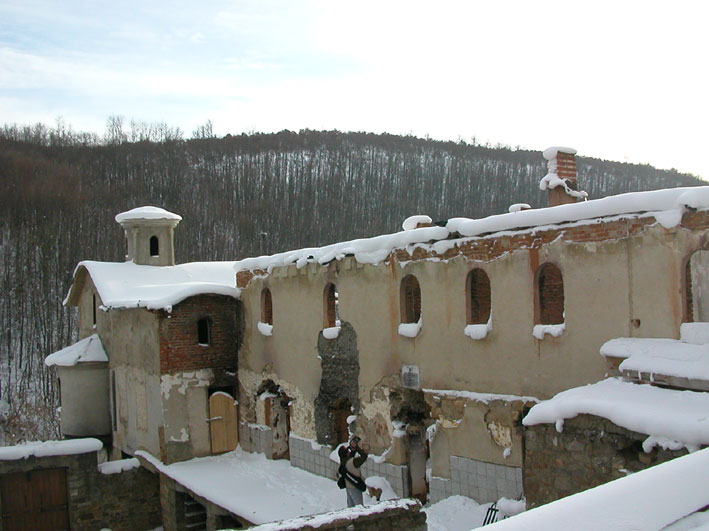
Burned monastery lodgings covered in snow

== See also ==
- List of Serbian Orthodox monasteries

== Notes ==
a.
