= Runik ocarina =

Prehistoric musical instrument

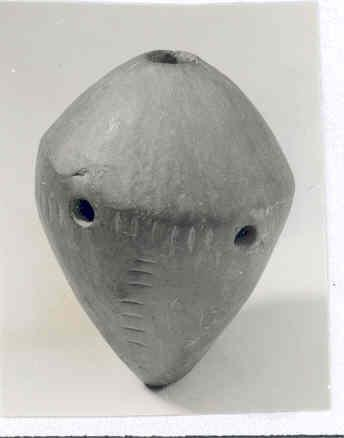
- The Neolithic Runik Ocarina

The Runik ocarina is the oldest ocarina found in Europe. It was found in the village of Runik, Skenderaj, Kosovo. It dates back to at least 8000 years ago, and it is the earliest prehistoric musical instrument ever recorded in Kosovo and the Balkans.

Highlighting the archaeological importance of this find, the Runik ocarina is featured on the upper-left side of the Emblem of Skenderaj.
