= Tahir Meha =

Albanian political activist

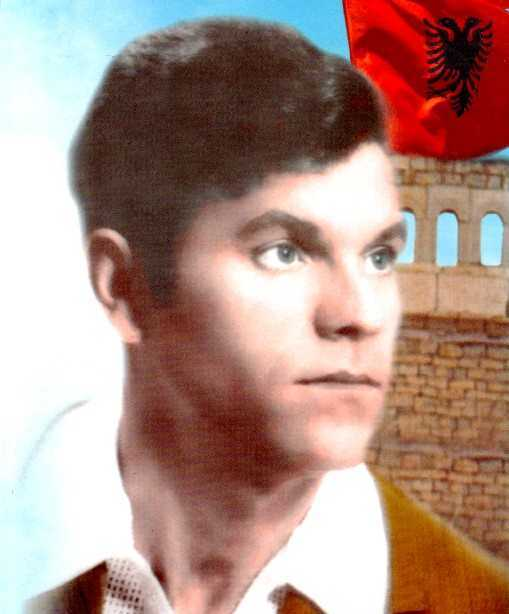
- Born: 10 October 1943; Prekaz i Epërm, Skënderaj, Albanian Kingdom (under German occupation)
- Died: 13 May 1981 (aged 37); Prekaz i Epërm, Skënderaj, SFR Yugoslavia (today Kosovo)
- Awards: Hero of Kosovo (posthumously)

Tahir Meha (10 October 1943 – 13 May 1981) was an Albanian political activist and major figure in the Kosovar Albanian resistance during Yugoslav rule. His refusal to surrender his weapons to Yugoslav authorities escalated into armed confrontation, ending with his death alongside his father, Nebih Meha on 13 May 1981. He remains a significant figure in Albanian folklore where he is remembered as a hero.

== Early life ==
Tahir Meha was born on 10 October 1943 in Prekaz, Drenica, in then German occupied Kosovo, a region known for its resistance. The Meha family played a prominent role in preserving Albanian national identity, particularly during periods of foreign occupation. Their home, the Kulla e Mehajve, was not only a residence but also came to represent a symbol of resilience and defiance amongst Kosovar Albanians.

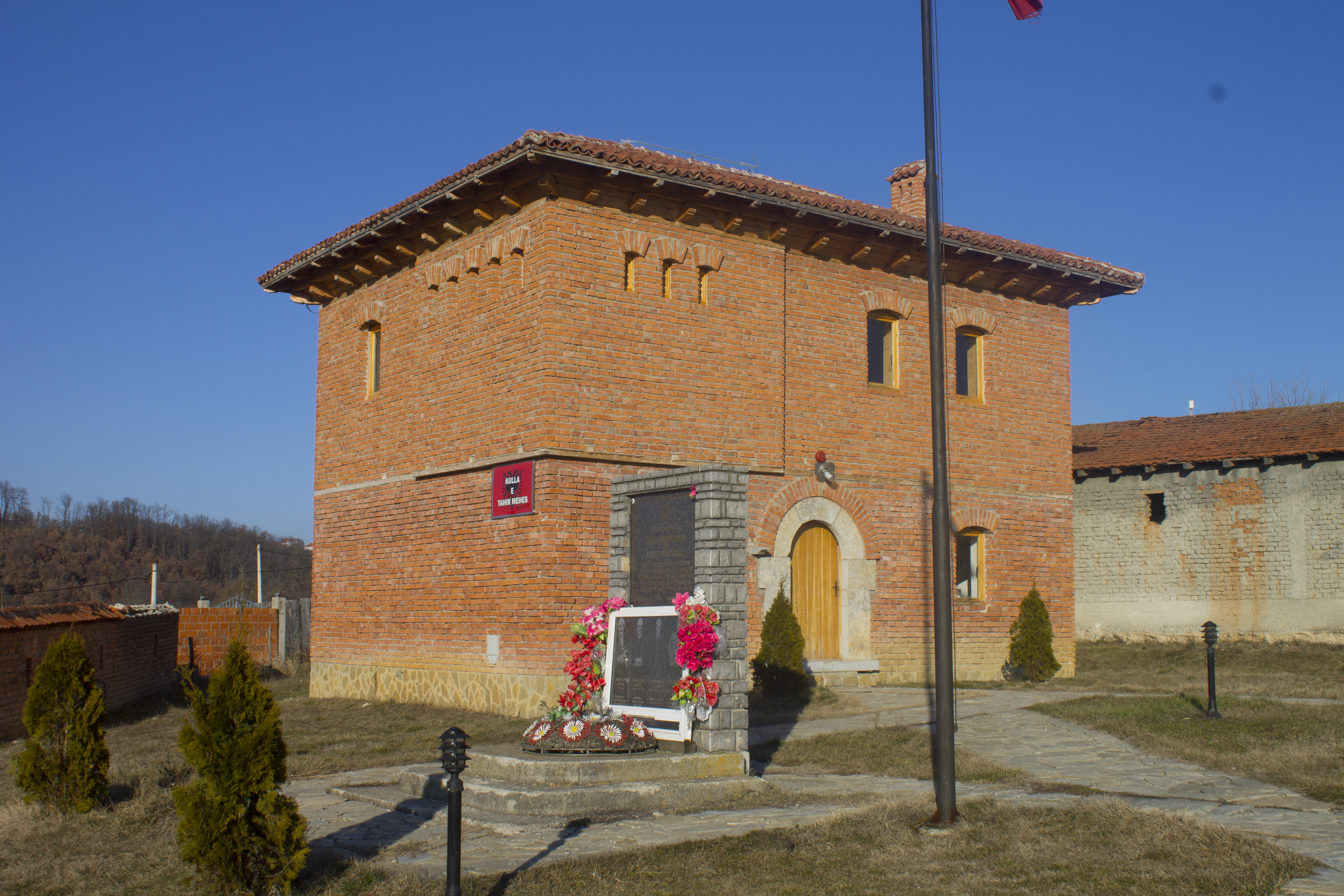
Tahir Meha's kulla in Prekaz

Meha's grandfather, Emin Lati (1892–1974), was a member of the Albanian ethnic guerilla Kachaks during the early 20th century. He fought alongside Azem Bejta, who led the rebels in armed resistance against Serbian rule in the 1920s. After Bejta's death in 1924, Emin Lati preserved the leader's revolver, which came into possession of the family, passing from Emin Lati to his son Nebih and ultimately to Tahir Meha.

His father, Nebih Meha (1910–1981), had participated in the Second World War, fighting alongside collaborationist Shaban Polluzha and other Albanians against the Yugoslav Partisans and Chetniks.

== Political Activism ==
=== Underground activity ===
After WWII, Kosovo Albanians faced strict restrictions on their political, cultural and civil rights under Yugoslavia, particularly during the oppressive regime of Aleksandar Ranković and the mass displacement of Albanians to Turkey in the 1950s and 1960s.

Tahir Meha was deeply affected by this environment and began participating in underground resistance activities aimed at opposing the Yugoslav regime, as demonstrations and protests surged across Kosovo, particularly in the early 1980s. Rather than engaging in organized political movements, who would eventually unite to the People's Movement of Kosovo, Meha’s resistance was personal and nationalistic. His possession of Azem Bejta’s revolver was not just a practical matter, but also a statement of his family’s link to the Albanian national cause.

=== Confrontation with Yugoslav authorities ===
On 13 May 1981, a date that coincided with Yugoslav Militia Day, Meha was at the local market in Prekaz when two Yugoslav police officers spotted the revolver at his waist and demanded him to surrender it.

Meha refused and the heated argument became a violent confrontation, during which Meha opened fire on the police officers, wounding several officers. Following the clash, Meha retreated to his family home, where he was joined by his father, Nebih Meha.

Yugoslav authorities mobilized a massive military response, deploying several battalions equipped with tanks, helicopters and heavy artillery. The order came directly from Franjo Herljević, Yugoslavia's Federal Secretary of Internal Affairs, who declared that Meha should be captured either dead or alive at any cost. The siege on the Meha residence began at 10:00 p.m. and lasted for nearly 22 hours.

== Death ==
The siege escalated as the authorities used tear gas and made four attempts to storm the kulla. Each attempt was repelled by Tahir and his father, who killed three special unit police officers—Salih Hasanović, Vojo Tubić, Milenko Pejović and local Albanian police officer, Muhamet Selmanaj and wounding five others.

Around 3:00 PM, the police were reinforced with tanks, which bombarded Tahir's kulla until the evening, but according to reports, Meha managed to damage a tank by throwing a grenade into its cabin. However, the overwhelming firepower of the combined police and military forces eventually caused the walls to collapse.

During the chaos, Meha was fatally shot as searchlights exposed his position. His body, riddled with eight bullets, was retrieved by local villagers the next morning.

After six months, their kulla was demolished by the police after being constantly guarded, while Tahir's brother Beqir and his uncle Mehmet, were imprisoned for six months.

The siege underscored the lengths to which Yugoslav authorities were willing to go to suppress nationalistic movements. For ethnic Albanians, it also highlighted the symbolic significance of Meha’s stand, as an entire military and police force were required to crush the resistance of just two individuals. His father, Nebih Meha, was also killed during the siege and his 15-year-old daughter, Zadja, was heavily injured.

== Legacy ==
Tahir Meha’s legacy is celebrated in Albanian folklore and his story is often recounted as an example of patriotism and defiance in the face of overwhelming odds. The date of his death, 13 May, has since been commemorated as a day of remembrance for those who fought for Kosovo's independence.

On the 35th anniversary of Meha’s death in 2016, Hashim Thaçi, then President of the Republic of Kosovo, paid tribute to his grave in Prekaz. Speaking at the site, Thaçi described the resistance of Tahir and Nebih Meha as a turning point in the struggle against the Yugoslav regime. Thaçi further emphasized the connection between Meha’s resistance and the later efforts of the Kosovo Liberation Army, which ultimately achieved Kosovo’s independence. Beqir Meha, his brother, was later killed in Action, on March 25, 1999 while fighting for the KLA during the Kosovo War.

== Sources ==
- Elsie, Robert (2010). Historical Dictionary of Kosovo. Scarecrow Press. p. 219. ISBN 978-0-8108-7231-8.
- Malcolm, Noel. "Kosovo." A short history, London (1998).
