= Gazmend Çitaku =

Gazmend Çitaku is an Albanian Montenegrin photographer, publisher, and librarian. Born on December 4, 1970, in Skenderaj, Yugoslavia (now Kosovo), he lives and works in Ulcinj, Montenegro. He belongs to the Universum Academy of Switzerland, Bashkimit të Krijuesve Shqiptarë në Mal të Zi (“Union of Albanian Artists in Montenegro”), and the Qendrës Mediterane të Fotografisë dhe Asociacionit Ulqini (Ulcinj Association for Mediterranean Photography”).

== Works ==
Çitaku has published the following collections of his work, including both photography and monographs on the subject:

- Aventurat e Dorartit, Ulqin 2026
- Busulla e artë, Botoi Diti&Oli, Ulqin 2022, ISBN 978-9940-661-29-8
- "Pema Hyjnore" Galeri ODA, SHkodër, Albania. Ekspozitë personale e fotografisë, 19-29.11.2025
- Fotoalbum i Ulqinit. Ulcinj: Bashkimi i Krijuesve shqiptar në Mal të Zi. 2004.
- Servantesi në Ulqin. Documentary film. 2005.
- 'Abetare për fëmijët e kopshteve. Ulcinj: Asociacioni Ulqini. 2008.
- Fotoalbum i Ulqinit 2. Ulcinj: Asociacioni Ulqini. 2009.
- Urlaub in Ulqini 1959 - Alfred Wollner. Ulcinj: Asociacioni Ulqini. 2012.
- Tregime të çuditshme nga Ulqini. Ulcinj: Biblioteka Prozë, 2017. ISBN 978-9940-661-16-8.
- Udhëtim në kështjellat ilire në Mal të Zi. Ulcinj: Botoi Diti&Oli, 2019. ISBN 978-9940-661-23-6.
- "ULCINJ MISTERIOZNI GRAD", Ulcinj. 2023, ISBN 978-9940-661-31-1
