= Skenderaj =

Skenderaj: Skënderaj or Skënderaji (Albanian) Srbica or Србица (Serbian)
- Town and municipality
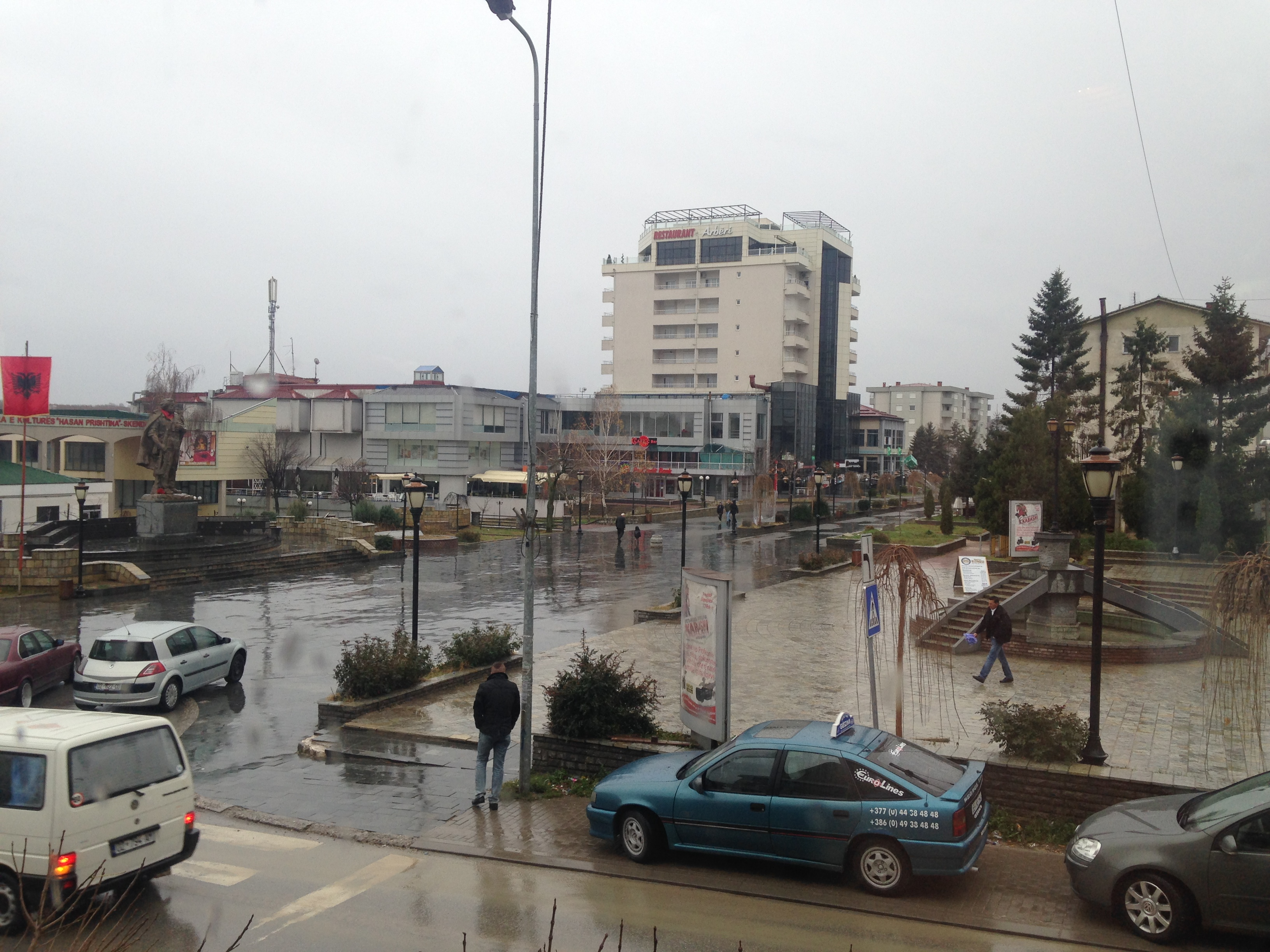
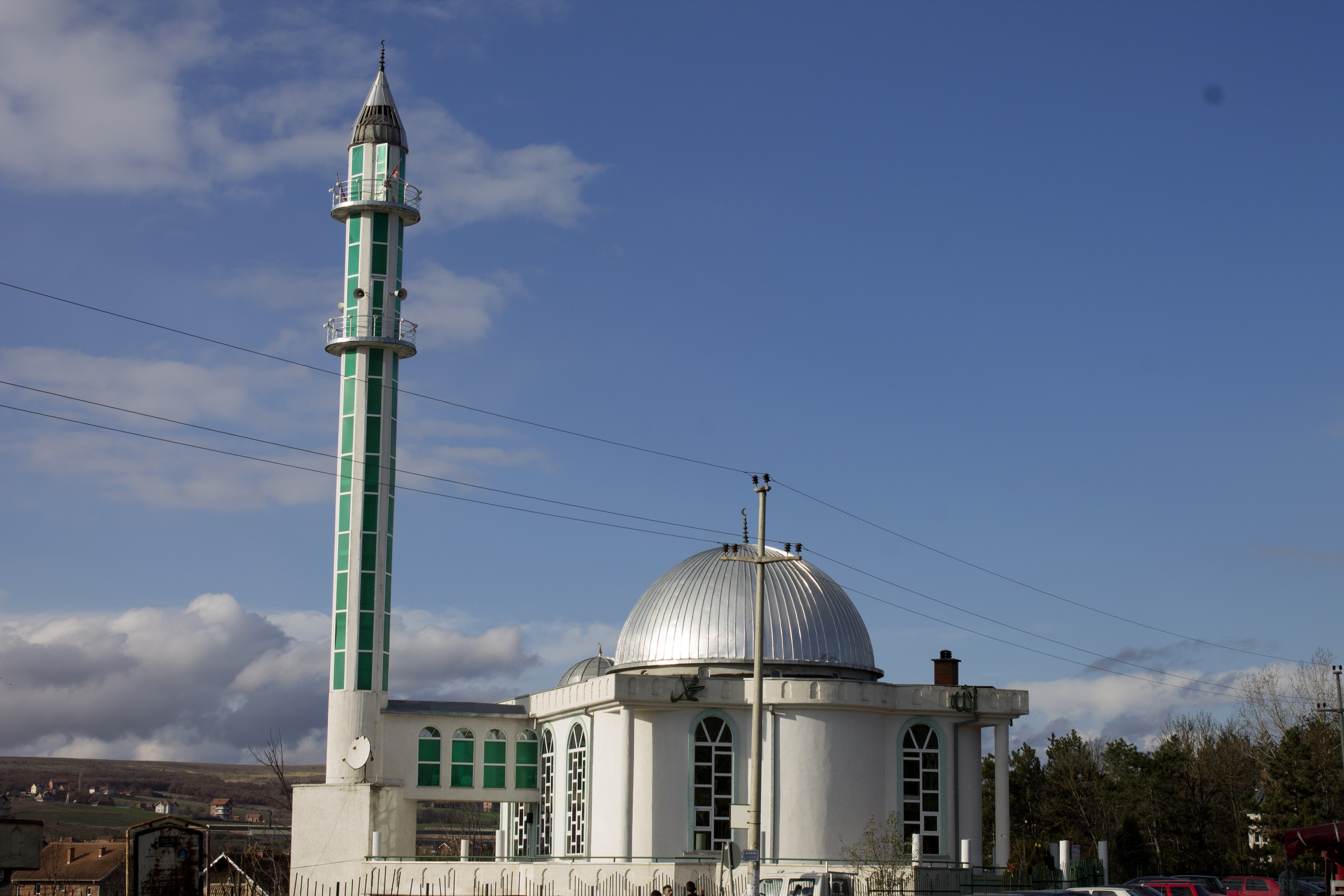
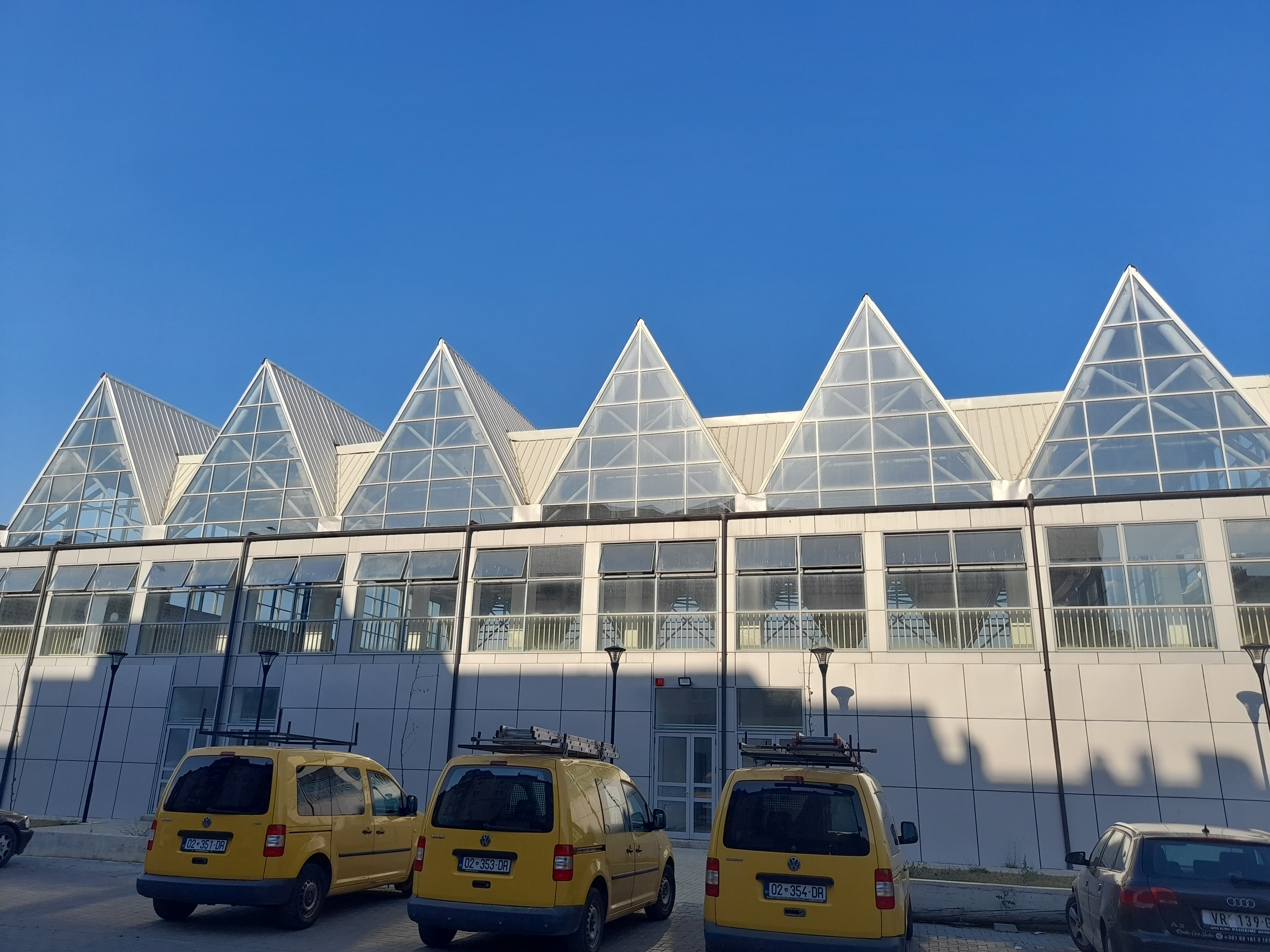
- Skenderaj Town Centre Skenderaj Mosque Ilaz Kodra Sports Hall

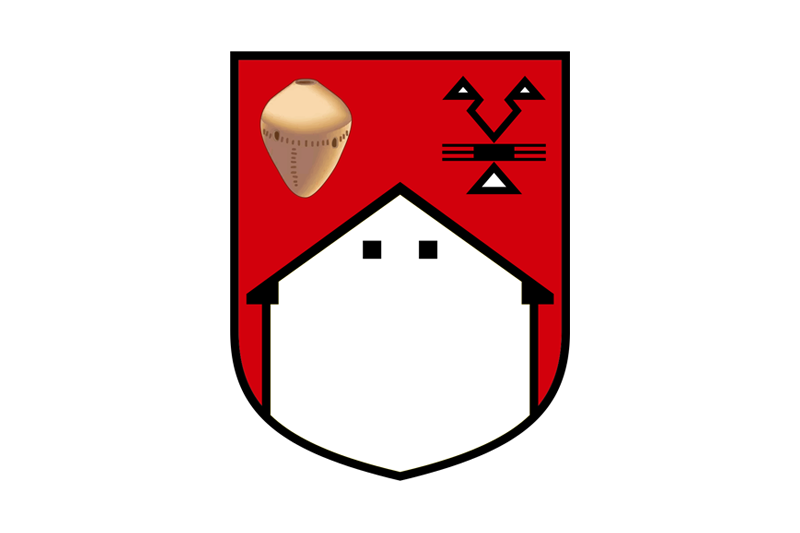
- Flag Emblem
- Interactive map of Skenderaj
- Location within Kosovo
- Coordinates: 42°44′N 20°47′E
- Country: Kosovo
- District: Mitrovica
- Established: 1924
- Named for: Skanderbeg

Government
  - Mayor: Sami Lushtaku (PDK)

Area
  - Municipality: 374 km^{2} (144 sq mi)
  - Rank: 11th in Kosovo
- Elevation: 620 m (2,030 ft)

Population (2024)
  - Municipality: 40,664
  - Density: 109/km^{2} (282/sq mi)
  - Urban: 11,185
  - Ethnicity: 99.32% Albanians; 0.68% Other
- Time zone: UTC+1 (CET)
  - Summer (DST): UTC+2 (CEST)
- Postal code: 41000
- Area code: +383 28
- Vehicle registration: 02
- Website: Official site

Skënderaj (Albanian definite form: Skënderaji) or Srbica (Serbian Cyrillic: Србица), is a town and municipality located in the district of Mitrovica, Kosovo. According to the 2024 census, the municipality of Skënderaj has 40,664 inhabitants.

It is the largest city in the Drenica geographical region of Kosovo. It is mainly populated by ethnic Albanians. It is the place where the Kosovo War began in 1998, and to which the most damage was done.

== Etymology ==
Albanians use the name Skenderaj from the name of the Albanian medieval hero, Gjergj Kastrioti - Skanderbeg, while the Serbian name was applied after the First Balkan War as an attempt of Serbianisation the region and the whole of Kosovo.

== Geography ==
The settlement is by the Klina river, in the Klina field. It is the main settlement of the Drenica region. The Klina river belongs to the Dukagjin region, while the settlement morphologically and hydrologically gravitates towards the Kosovo region.

The municipality covers an area of 378 km^{2} (146 sq mi), including the town of Skenderaj and 49 villages.

== History ==
=== Antiquity ===
The village of Runik, 10 kilometres (6.2 mi) northwest of Skenderaj, is one of the most prominent Neolithic sites in Kosovo to date, contains artefacts from the Starcevo and Vinca cultures. Research was conducted in about 35 private parcels in the Dardania neighborhood of Runik. Starcevo and Vinca pottery fragments dating to 6500-3500 BC have been found at the site. A significant find is a baked-clay ocarina 8 centimetres (3.1 in) in length, known as the Runik ocarina, the oldest musical instrument found in Kosovo to date.

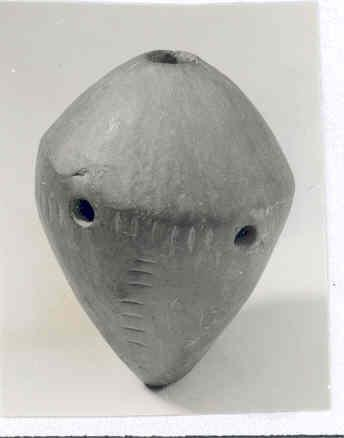
The Neolithic Runik ocarina is the oldest musical instrument found in Kosovo to date.

The municipality cadastral area includes several settlements that existed during the Middle Ages, among which some exist still today, such as Liqinë, Polac, Banjë, and others. There are ruins of a church dating to the 14th century in southern Leqinë. The Church of St. Nicholas was built in 1436, in Banjë, as the endowment of Serbian magnate Rodop. The Devič monastery was built in Llausha near Skënderaj in the 15th century, dedicated to the local monk, St. Joanikije (d. 1430). The Church of St. John was built in the 16th century on the ruins of a 14th-century church, in Leqinë; the church is surrounded by an old and large Serbian graveyard with tombs dating to the 17th–19th centuries. A 16th-century church and cemetery is located in Runik.

=== Interwar period and colonization ===
In 1924, the Kingdom of Serbs, Croats and Slovenes established the new town of Srbica [later renamed Skenderaj] in the Drenica region as part of its colonization policies. State authorities were moved to the town, where new houses were built and distributed to colonists from Montenegro and the Toplica region.[¹] Public buildings were also constructed, including council and court offices, tax and finance administration, a post office, a school, barracks, and other facilities for state officials.

The Albanian local leadership strongly opposed the colonization, which they perceived as an attempt to alter the demographic balance of the region. Earlier attempts to establish the town in Llausha had failed due to local resistance, including attacks by Kaçak fighters.[¹]

In the early 20th century Albanian resistance began with the Kachak movement led by Azem Bejta and his wife Shote Galica, who fought against Bulgarian, Austro-Hungarian and Yugoslav forces. At the end of World War II in 1944, the leader of the Drenica Brigade Shaban Polluzha refused to lead his 12,000 men north and join the Partisans in order to pursue the retreating Germans, because Serbian Chetnik groups were attacking the Albanian population in Kosovo.

=== Modern ===
During the Kosovo War, Serbian forces reportedly emptied the town of its Albanian inhabitants and executed approximately 115 ethnic Albanian males over the age of 18. Serbian authorities reportedly were holding detainees in an ammunition factory in the town. Skenderaj was a KLA stronghold during the Kosovo War.

== Demography ==
The municipality of Skenderaj has a population of 40,664 inhabitants, while the town has a population of 11,185 inhabitants. The municipality is homogenous in terms of ethnicity, referring to the fact that ethnic Albanians comprise 99.83% of the population.

Municipal historical population
Year	Pop.	±% p.a.
1948	23,744	—
1953	26,166	+1.96%
1961	30,308	+1.85%
1971	36,660	+1.92%
1981	46,927	+2.50%
1991	55,471	+1.69%
2011	50,858	−0.43%
2024	40,664	−1.71%

=== Language ===
The Albanians of Skenderaj, as well as the other Albanians of Kosovo, speak the dialect of the Albanian language, Northeastern Gheg.

== Economy ==
Skënderaj has historically been the poorest municipality in Kosovo, with little investment having been made since the time of the former Yugoslavia. It suffers from low economic activity and continuous high unemployment. Agriculture is the major local industry but the municipality has not fully developed existing arable land. Today, the local economy consists of small enterprises such as family-run shops and restaurants while two privatized factories, a brick and a flour mill, employ a few hundred people. The other major sector of employment is the municipality's civil service.

== Sport ==
Skënderaj is home of the football club KF Drenica, which plays their home games in the Bajram Aliu Stadium and competes in the second tier league called First Football League of Kosovo. Skënderaj is also home of the Kosovar Superliga volleyball club KV Skenderaj women's and KV Drenica men's.

== Cultural heritage ==
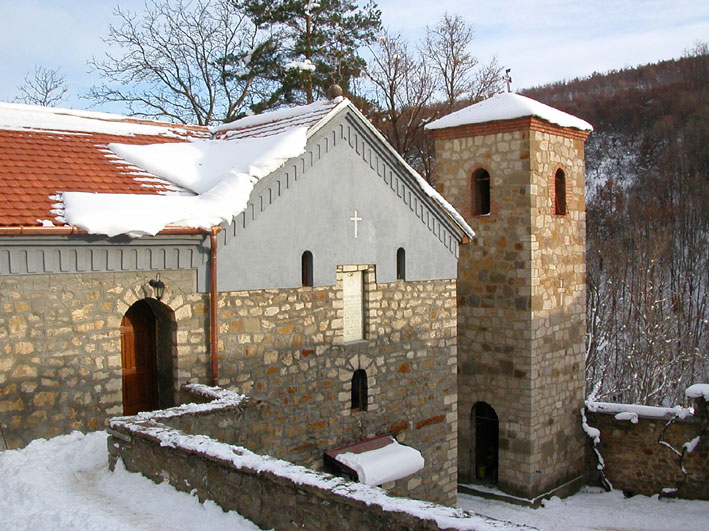
- Devič monastery was founded by Đurađ Branković, Serbian Despot
  Devič, Serbian Orthodox abbey

== Notable people ==
- Adem Jashari, one of the KLA founders and commander, Hero of Kosovo
- Ahmet Delia, activist of League of Prizren
- Bashkim Jashari, military general and commander of Kosovo Security Force
- Flora Brovina, poet, pediatrician and women's rights activist
- Gazmend Çitaku, photographer, publisher and librarian
- Hamëz Jashari, one of the founders of KLA and brother of Adem Jashari
- Hasan Prishtina, political leader of Albanian National Movement
- Hashim Thaçi, politician, KLA commander, former prime minister and president of Kosovo
- Ilaz Kodra, KLA commander
- Leonora Jakupi, singer and songwriter
- Malush Ahmeti, KLA commander
- Mehmet Hetemaj, footballer
- Përparim Hetemaj, footballer
- Shaban Polluzha, military leader
- Shote Galica, Kachak leader
- Sylejman Selimi, commander of the Drenica operational zone
- Tahir Meha, famous Albanian political activist
- Abedin Rexha, KLA commander of the brigade 112

== See also ==
- Municipalities of Kosovo
- Cities and towns in Kosovo
- Populated places in Kosovo
