= Joanikije of Devič =

Serbian Orthodox saint

Saint Joanikije of Devič Јоаникије Девички
- Venerated in: Serbian Orthodox Church

Joanikije of Devič (Serbian: Јоаникије Девички), archaically also Janićije (Јанићије) was a 15th-century Serbian Orthodox saint.

He was a native Serb from the Principality of Zeta or, according to another source, a Serb from Austrian Dalmatia. As a young man with a passion for Jesus, he left his home and moved to the Ibar river valley, to the mouth of the Crna Reka river, to the narrow cave in which, according to the tradition, St. Peter of Koriša previously lived. However, when his fame began to spread among the people, he fled to Drenica, and hid in the dense Devička forest. Joanikije spent years there in solitude, in silence and in prayer.

According to the tradition, Serbian Despot Đurađ Branković brought him his mad daughter, who was healed by the Saint. Out of gratitude, Branković built a monastery on that place, still known today as the Devič Monastery. He was known as the healer of all diseases, especially the "obsessed". This is where the relics of St. Joanikije rest, which Christians believe are miraculous.

Devič Monastery was burned in 1941 by Albanian extremists and reconstructed in 1945. It was once again a target in 1999 during the Kosovo War by the Kosovo Liberation Army. The monastery was vandalized and all food and two cars were stolen. The marble tomb of St. Joanikije was desecrated by local Albanians in June 1999. Since then it has been under the constant protection of French KFOR troops.

== See more ==
- Serbian Saints

== Literature ==
- Ohrid Prologue, Bishop Nikolaj Velimirović
