= Demographic history of Kosovo =

This article includes information on the demographic history of Kosovo.

== Prehistory and antiquity ==
The Dardani (/ˈdɑːrdənaɪ/; Ancient Greek: Δαρδάνιοι, Δάρδανοι; Latin: Dardani) were a Paleo-Balkan tribe who lived in a region named Dardania after their settlement there. The eastern parts of the region were at the Thraco-Illyrian contact zone. In archaeological research, Illyrian names are predominant in western Dardania (present-day Kosovo), and occasionally appear in eastern Dardania (present-day south-eastern Serbia), while Thracian names are found in the eastern parts, but are absent from the western parts. Thus, their identification as either an Illyrian or Thracian tribe has been a subject of debate; the ethnolinguistic relationship between the two groups being largely uncertain and debated itself as well. The correspondence of Illyrian names, including those of the ruling elite, in Dardania with those of the southern Illyrians suggests a "thracianization" of parts of Dardania.

=== Roman antiquity ===
After the Roman conquest of Illyria in 168 BC, Romans colonized and founded several cities in the region, such as Ulpiana, Theranda and Vicianum, later incorporating it into the Roman province of Illyricum in 59 BC. Subsequently, it became part of Moesia Superior in AD 87. The region was exposed to an increasing number of 'barbarian' raids from the 4th century AD onwards, culminating with the Slavic migrations of the 6th and 7th centuries. Archaeologically, the early Middle Ages represent a hiatus in the material record. The decrease in material finds corresponds to the effects which the plague of Justinian probably had throughout the Balkans as millions of people died and many regions became depopulated. The population decrease in the Balkans partially influenced the Slavic migrations of the following centuries.

== Early and High Middle Ages ==
The region had been part of the Roman and the Byzantium until the first major Slav raids took place in the middle of Justinian's reign. In 547 and 548 the Slavs invaded the territory of modern Kosovo, and then got as far as Durrës on the Northern Albanian coast and reached all the way down to Greece.

Although the Balkans had been raided by Slavic tribes, the early Slavic settlement and power in Kosovo did not become large until the region was later absorbed into the Bulgarian Empire in the 850s, when Christianity and a Byzantine-Slavic culture was cemented in the central and eastern Balkans. This era represents the formation of most Slavic toponyms in Kosovo which reflect Old Bulgarian development. The Gorani people in Kosovo represent the last population in Kosovo which still speaks a Bulgarian/Macedonian dialect.

Following the collapse of the Bulgarian Empire, the region again became part of the Byzantine Empire after the empire fully re-established itself. It would stay under Byzantine rule for nearly two centuries until Serbian Grand Prince Stefan Nemanja, who had expanded his empire south and into Kosovo, conquered it by the end of the 12th century.

According to Serbian scholars, although Albanians lived between Lake Skadar and the Devoll river in the 1100s, Albanian migration into the plains of Metohija (Albanian: Dukagjin) commenced at the end of the century. Some of the arriving Albanians were assimilated by Serbs and Montenegrins.

According to historian Noel Malcolm the Vlach-Romanian and Aromanian languages originated in the region from Romanized Illyrians and Thracians, and was a contact zone between the Albanian and Romanian language.

Vlach-Romanian and Aromanian toponyms are present in the surrounding areas, such as Surdul in Southern Serbia. Katun is a living style associated with Eastern Romance people. Katun means 'village' in the Albanian, Aromanian and Romanian languages.

When King Stefan of Dečani founded the Visoki Dečani Monastery in the 1330s, he referred to "villages and katuns of Vlachs and Albanians" in the area of the white Drin. Dečanski granted the monastery pasture land along with Vlach and Albanian katuns around the Drim and Lim rivers, which carried salt and provided serf labour for the monastery.

Dušan's Code, the legal system established in 1349, included a prohibition of intermarriage between Serbs and Vlachs. The protection of Slav peasants by the Dušan's Code forced many Vlachs to migrate from Serbia.

Several Albanian personal names and place names appear in various parts of Kosovo and North Macedonia in the 13th century, the first identifiably Albanian place name appearing in Kosovo, attested in a 1253 statement by Serbian knez Miroslav. By 1330, the frequency of identifiably Albanian names in a 1330 chrysobull describing estates in Decan is "many", although attempts to ascertain reliable percentages of the Albanian population relative to Serbs at this period or later are described by Madgearu as "difficult".

The presence of Vlach villages in the vicinity of Prizren is attested in 1198–1199 by a charter of Stephan Nemanja. An old Albanian population lived in the region before the Ottoman period.

== 9th–13 century ==
=== Bulgarian rule ===
Between ca. 830 and ca. 1015 the region was Bulgarian. According to historian Richard J. Crampton, the development of Old Church Slavonic literacy during the 10th century had the effect of preventing the assimilation of the South Slavs into the Byzantine culture, which promoted the formation of a distinct Bulgarian identity in that area. Afterwards it was ceded to the Byzantine empire as a province called Byzantine Bulgaria.

=== Byzantine rule ===
In 1072 an unsuccessful rebellion led by local Bulgarian landlord Georgi Voiteh arose in the area and in 1072 in Prizren he was crowned "Tsar of Bulgaria". At the end of the 11th century, the Byzantine domains in the Balkans became an arena of fierce hostilities. At the end of the 12th century, formally Byzantium was still the sovereign. The disintegration of Byzantium was complete when in 1204 the Fourth Crusade captured Constantinople.

== Late Middle Ages ==
Chrysobulls related to tax rights for Orthodox monasteries form the vast majority of the existing sources for the available demographics of Kosovo in the 14th century. The Dečani chrysobulls (1321–31) of Serbian king Stefan of Dečani contains a detailed list of landholdings and tax farming rights which the Serbian Orthodox monastery of Visoki Dečani held over settlements and various communities in an area which spanned from southern Serbia (modern Sandzak), Kosovo, Montenegro and parts of northern Albania. The chrysobulls were signed by King Stefan of Dečani who confirmed existing rights and gave new ones to the monastery. The chrysobulls listed that Visoki Dečani held tax farming rights over 2,097 households of meropsi (dependent farmers-serfs), 266 Vlach households (pastoral communities) and 69 sokalniki (craftsmen). Among the settlements over which Dečani held tax rights in modern-day Kosovo, find Serbs living alongside Albanians and Vlachs. In the golden bull of Stefan Dušan (1348) a total of nine Albanian villages are cited within the vicinity of Prizren among the communities which were under tax obligations. During this period, among a part of the Albanians a degree of Serbianization and conversions to Serbian Orthodoxy seems to have taken place.

The Ottoman cadastral tax census (defter) of 1455 in the District of Branković (defter Vuk-ili) is one of the oldest Ottoman tax registers in the Balkans. The District of Branković at the time of the defter included parts of central Serbia (present-day Toplica District and the historical Raška Region), part of northeastern Montenegro and parts of eastern Kosovo (the Kosovo Plain). The vast majority of names recorded in Vuk-ili by the Ottomans in 1455 are Slavic.

The defters of 1485–87 of the Sanjak of Shkodra and parts of the former Branković areas recorded:

- Vushtrri district:
  - 16,729 Christian households (412 in Pristina and Vushtrri)
  - 117 Muslim households (94 in Pristina and 83 in rural areas)
- District of Peja:
  - Peja (town)
  - 121 Christian households
  - 33 Muslim households
- Suho Grlo and Metohija:
  - 131 Christian households
- Donja Klina – nationalities not clear according to Ottoman records based on religion
- Deçan – nationalities not clear according to Ottoman records based on religion
- Rural areas:
  - 6,124 Christian households (99%)
  - 55 Muslim households (1%)

Scholarship on Kosovo has encompassed Ottoman provincial surveys that have revealed the 15th-century ethnic composition of some Kosovo settlements. However, both Serbian and Albanian historians using these records have made much of them while proving little. Madgearu (2008) argues that the series of defters from 1455 onward "shows that Kosovo... was a mosaic of Serbian and Albanian villages", while Prishtina and Prizren already had significant Albanian Muslim populations, and that the same defter of 1455 indicates the presence of Albanians in Tetovo. During the 15th century, Albanians moved to the town of Novo Brdo to work on the mines.

== 16th century ==
=== 1520–1535 ===
- Vushtrri: 19,614 households
  - Christians
  - 700 Muslim households (3.5%)
- Prizren
  - Christians
  - 359 Muslim households (2%)

=== 1591 ===
Ottoman defter from 1591:

- Prizren – Christian majority, significant Muslim minority
- Gora – No nationalities are recorded. only religious affiliations of dwellers.
- Opolje – Christian majority, significant Muslim minority

== 17th–18th centuries ==
In 17th century reports indicate western Kosovo and parts of central Kosovo was Albanian speaking while the Eastern region was Slavic speaking. A wave of Catholic Albanian colonists arrived in the 17th century to the towns of Pristina and Gjakova.

In the 17th century the towns of Peja, Prizren, Prishtina were majority Muslim.

Catholic bishop Pjetër Mazreku noted in 1624 that the Catholics of Prizren were 200, the Serbs (Orthodox) 600, and Muslims, almost all of whom were Albanians, numbered 12,000.

During the Great Austro-Turkish War, Albanian Catholic leaders Pjetër Bogdani and Toma Raspasani rallied Kosovo Albanian Catholics and Muslims to the pro-Austrian cause. Reports of 20,000 Albanians in Kosovo that had turned their weapons against the Turks. After the Austrians were forced to retreat, reprisals on the population followed as a result. In the 1690s Raspasani wrote that most of the Catholics in Kosovo had fled to Budapest where most of them died of hunger or disease.

Significant clusters of Albanian populations lived in Kosovo especially in the west and centre before and after the Habsburg invasion of 1689–1690. Due to the Ottoman-Habsburg wars and their aftermath, some Albanians from contemporary northern Albania and Western Kosovo settled within the wider Kosovo area in the second half of the 18th century, at times instigated by Ottoman authorities. There were also movements and forcible movements of Orthodox Serbs into Kosovo instigated by Ottoman authorities and as such, historians have concluded these events affected all categories of the populations rather than one eroding the other.

Significant Albanian clusters also existed in Eastern Kosovo. Some of the towns had a large Muslim Albanian population that did not regain their pre-1690 levels until the mid 19th century.

Early reports state that hundreds of villages between the area of Trepca, Vushtrri and Prishtina region of eastern Kosovo were abandoned, while villages in the western part of Kosovo were still inhabited.

Successive persecutions of Serbs by the Ottomans in the southern Balkans resulted in migrations to areas under the control of the Habsburg monarchy, in particular during the Great Turkish War of 1683–1699. During that war between the Ottomans and the Habsburgs, it led to the flight of a substantial numbers of Serbs and Albanians who had sided with the Austrians, from within and outside Kosovo, to Austrian held Vojvodina and the Military Frontier – Patriarch Arsenije III, one of the refugees, referred to 30,000 or 40,000 souls, but a much later monastic source referred to 37,000 families. Serbian historians have used this second source to talk of a Great Migration of Serbs. Wars in 1717–1738 led to a second exodus of refugees (both Serbian and Albanian) from inside and outside Kosovo, together with reprisals and the enslavement and deportation of a number of Serbs and Albanians by the victorious Ottomans.

== 19th century ==
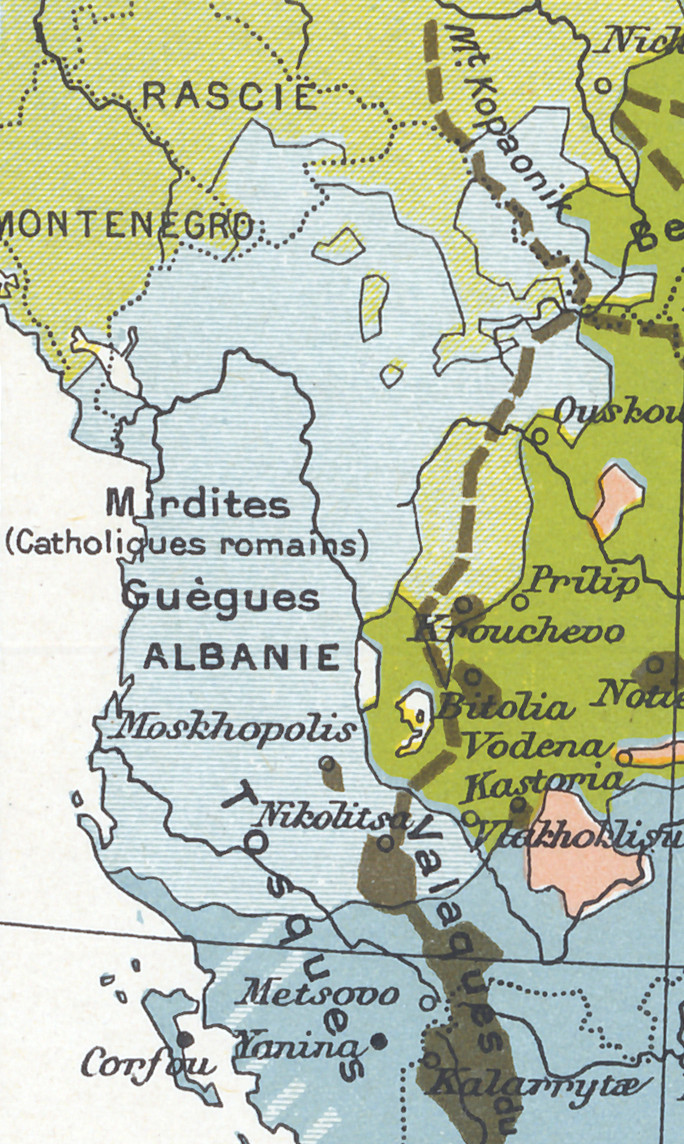
Ethnographic map of Balkans (detail), Atlas Général Vidal-Lablache, Paris, 1913.

Kosovo was part of the Kosovo Vilayet, which included Kosovo, parts of northern and northwestern North Macedonia, parts of modern eastern Montenegro and much of the Sandzak region. Nineteenth-century data about the Kosovo Vilayet tend to be rather conflicting, giving sometimes numerical superiority to the Serbs and sometimes to the Albanians. The Ottoman statistics are regarded as unreliable, as the empire counted its citizens by religion rather than nationality, using birth records rather than surveys of individuals.

A map published by French ethnographer G. Lejean in 1861 shows that Albanians lived on around 57% of Kosovo Vilayet while a similar map, published by British travellers G. M. Mackenzie and A. P. Irby in 1867 shows slightly less; these maps don't show which population was larger overall. Nevethless, maps cannot be used to measure population as they leave out density.

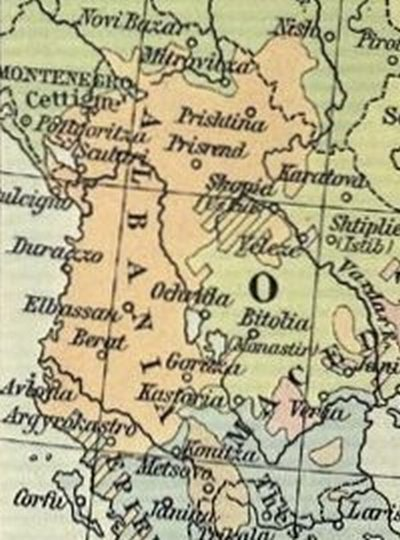
Ethnic distribution of Albanians, The Historical Atlas, New York, 1911

Maps published by German historian Kiepert in 1876, J. Hahn and Austrian consul K. Sax, show that Albanians live on most of the territory of what is now Kosovo, however, they do not show which population is larger. According to these, the regions of Kosovska Mitrovica and Kosovo Polje were settled mostly by Serbs, whereas most of the territory of western and eastern parts of today's province was settled by Muslim Albanians.

An Austrian statistics published in 1899 estimated about the population of the Kosovo Vilayet:

- 349,350

of which national affiliation is not mentioned according to the source

During and after the Serbian–Ottoman War of 1876–78, between 49,000 and 130,000 Albanians were expelled by the Serb army from the Sanjak of Niș (located north-east of contemporary Kosovo) and fled to the Kosovo Vilayet. Serbs from the Lab region moved to Serbia during and after the war of 1876 and incoming Albanian refugees (muhaxhirë) repopulated their villages. Apart from the Lab region, sizeable numbers of Albanian refugees were resettled in other parts of northern Kosovo alongside the new Ottoman-Serbian border. Most Albanian refugees were resettled in over 30 large rural settlements in central and southeastern Kosovo. Many refugees were also spread out and resettled in urban centers that increased their populations substantially. Western diplomats reporting in 1878 placed the number of refugee families at 60,000 families in Macedonia, with 60–70,000 refugees from Serbia spread out within the vilayet of Kosovo. The Ottoman governor of the Vilayet of Kosovo estimated in 1881 the refugees number to be around 65,000 with some resettled in the Sanjaks of Üsküp and Yeni Pazar.

In the late Ottoman period, Kosovo vilayet contained a diverse population of Muslim Albanians and Orthodox Serbs that was split along religious and ethnic lines.

Muslim Albanians formed the majority of the population in Kosovo vilayet that included an important part of the urban-professional and landowning classes of major towns., while Serbs were a majority in Eastern Kosovo, with a sizable Bulgarian minority in the south as well. Western Kosovo was composed of 50,000 inhabitants and an area dominated by the Albanian tribal system with 600 Albanians dying per year from blood feuding. The Yakova (Gjakovë) highlands contained 8 tribes that were mainly Muslim and in the Luma area near Prizren there were 5 tribes, mostly Muslim. The population of the tribal areas were composed of Kosovar Malisors (highlanders). The town of İpek had crypto-Christians who were of the Catholic faith.

Muslim Bosniaks whose native language was Slavic formed a sizable number of Kosovo vilayet's population and were concentrated mainly in Yenipazar sanjak. Circassian refugees who came from Russia were resettled by Ottoman authorities within Kosovo vilayet in 1864, numbering some 6,000 people by the 1890s.

In the northern half of Kosovo vilayet Orthodox Serbs were the largest Christian group and formed a majority within the eastern areas. Several thousand Aromanians inhabited Kosovo vilayet. Bulgarians lived in the southern half of Kosovo vilayet.

Ottoman provincial records for 1887 estimated that Albanians formed more than half of Kosovo vilayet's population concentrated in the sanjaks of İpek, Prizren and Priştine. In the sanjaks of Yenipazar, Taşlica and Üsküp, Albanians formed a smaller proportion of the population.

In 1897, the Ottoman authorities ordered a religious census for Kosovo, which found that there were 633,765 Muslims and 333,406 Christians in Kosovo at the time, meaning that Christians formed 35% of the population. Christians were severely underrepresented in the local governments and administration, with only a few officials being Christians in the entirety of Kosovo. Paolo Maggiolini attributes the decline of the Christian population to failure of the 1878 uprising, which was used by the Ottoman authorities to justify forced conversions and expulsions of the Catholic and Orthodox communities in Kosovo.

According to Ger Duijzings, the middle of the 19th century marked the first time when Albanian speakers formed a majority in Kosovo, with 1870s marking the point at which relations between the Serbs and Albanians of Kosovo turned highly hostile and violent. He argues that less than half of Kosovo was ethnically homogenous at the time - constant settlement and migration greatly undermined the local and tribal identities of Kosovo, with most Albanians being poorly integrated and Serbs either living in segregated Christian enclaves or assimilating into the Albanian majority:

In Kosovo, the process of Albanianization, i.e. the continuous migration of Albanians from the tribal areas of northern Albania into Kosovo, coincided with the process of Islamicization. The great majority of Albanians converted to Islam in the course of this process. Also many Serbs converted, subsequently adopting Albanian, the dominant language of their environment. These processes of Islamicization and Albanianization were still in full swing in the nineteenth century.

Because the process of religious conversion was violent and forced, Kosovo Albanians were also only nominally Muslims, with converts becoming fully only Islamicized after several generations. Duijzings also questions the concept of "Great Exodus of Serbs" of Kosovo propagated by Serbian historians, arguing that the main reason for sharp decline of Christianity in Kosovo was the dismantlement of ecclesiastical structures undertaken by the Ottoman administration in 18th and 19th century, resulting in "a process of Islamicization and Albanianization of Serbs."

Note: Territory of Ottoman Kosovo Vilayet was quite different from modern-day Kosovo.

== Early 20th century ==
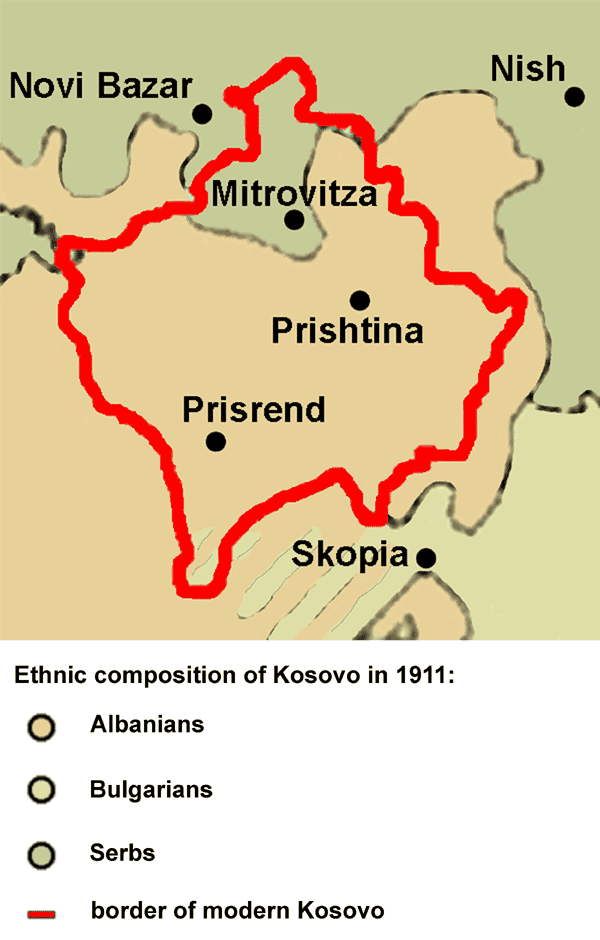
Ethnic composition of Kosovo in 1911

According to Aram Andonyan and Zavren Biberyan, in 1908, the Kosovo Vilayet, which included modern Kosovo and the northwestern part of modern North Macedonia, had a total population of 908,115, of which the largest group were Albanians with 46,1%, followed by Bulgarians at 29.1%, Serbs at 12.4% and Turks at 9.8%.

German scholar Gustav Weigand gave the following statistical data about the population of Kosovo, based on the pre-war situation in Kosovo in 1912:

- Pristina District: 67% Albanians, 27% Serbs
- Prizren District: 63% Albanians, 36% Serbs
- Vushtrri District: 90% Albanians, 10% Serbs
- Ferizaj District: 70% Albanians, 30% Serbs
- Gnjilane District: 75% Albanians, 23% Serbs
- Mitrovica District: 60% Serbs, 40% Albanians
- Kaçanik District: almost exclusively Albanian
- Gjakova & Metohija District: almost exclusively Albanian.

=== Ottoman population records ===
The Ottoman population records for 1895 indicate male population of 132,450 Muslims and 73,924 Christians for the Sanjak of Pristina, 73,708 Muslims and 24,101 Christians for the Sanjak of Prizren and 24,852 Muslims and 9,468 Christians for the Sanjak of Ipek, or a total of some 462,000 Muslims (of both sexes), or 68.2%, and some 215,000 Christians (of both sexes), or 31.8%, for the three sanjaks that form the majority of Kosovo. However, the data includes the large Kalkandelen kaza in the region of Macedonia, while the "Christians" category also includes Roman Catholics.

According to the 1905–1906 census of the Ottoman Empire, the population of the Sanjak of Pristina consisted of 278,870 Muslims and 111,328 Serbian Patriarchists, of the Sanjak of Prizren of 221,882 Muslims, 25,482 Serbian Patriarchists and 19,320 Bulgarian Exarchists (data includes the large Kalkandelen kaza in the region of Macedonia) and of the Sanjak of Ipek of 121,264 Muslims and 30,210 Serbian Patriarchists.

Data for the Kalandelen kaza is only available for the 1881-1882 census of the Ottoman Empire. It lists male population of 29,212 Muslims (or some 58,000 Muslims of both sexes), 4,990 Patriarchists (or some 10,000 of both sexes) and 9,830 Bulgarian Exarchists (or some 20,000 of both sexes). Thus, the population of the three sanjaks, minus the Kalkandelen kaza, for 1905/1906 consisted of 564,016 Muslims (78.2%) and 157,020 Serbian Patriarchists (21.8%). No data is provided about the third major confessional group in Kosovo, Roman Catholics.

=== Balkan Wars and First World War (Montenegro and Serbia) ===
Kosovo was part of the Ottoman Empire and following the Balkan Wars (1912–1913), the western part was included in Montenegro and the rest within Serbia. Citing Serbian sources, Noel Malcolm also states that in 1912 when Kosovo came under Serbian control, "the Orthodox Serb population [was] at less than 25%" of Kosovo's entire population.

Beginning from 1912, Montenegro initiated its attempts at colonisation and enacted a law on the process during 1914 that aimed at expropriating 55,000 hectares of Albanian land and transferring it to 5,000 Montenegrin settlers. Some Serb colonisation of Kosovo took place during the Balkan Wars. Serbia undertook measures for colonisation by enacting a decree aimed at colonists within "newly liberated areas" that offered 9 hectares of land to families.

== Yugoslav Interwar period ==
In the aftermath of the First World War, Serbian control over Kosovo was restored and the Kingdom pursued a policy to alter the national and religious demographics of Kosovo and to Serbianise the area through colonisation. Kosovo was an area where Serbs were not a majority population and the state sought demographic change in those areas through land reform and a colonisation policy. A new decree issued in 1919 and later in 1920 restarted the colonisation process in places where Albanians lived in Kosovo and Vardar Macedonia.

=== 1921 census ===
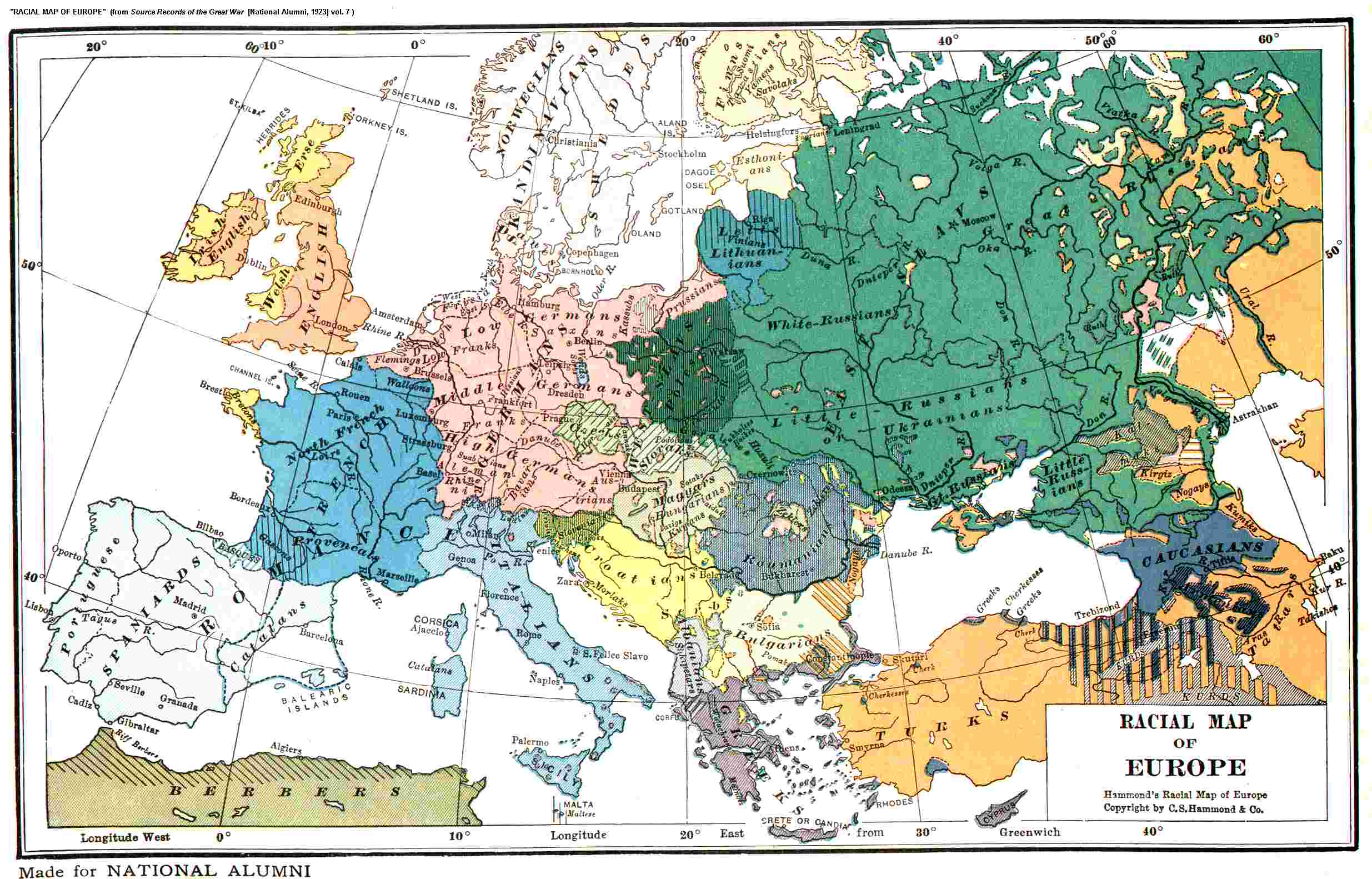
Ethnographic map of Europe in 1922, C.S. Hammond & Co.

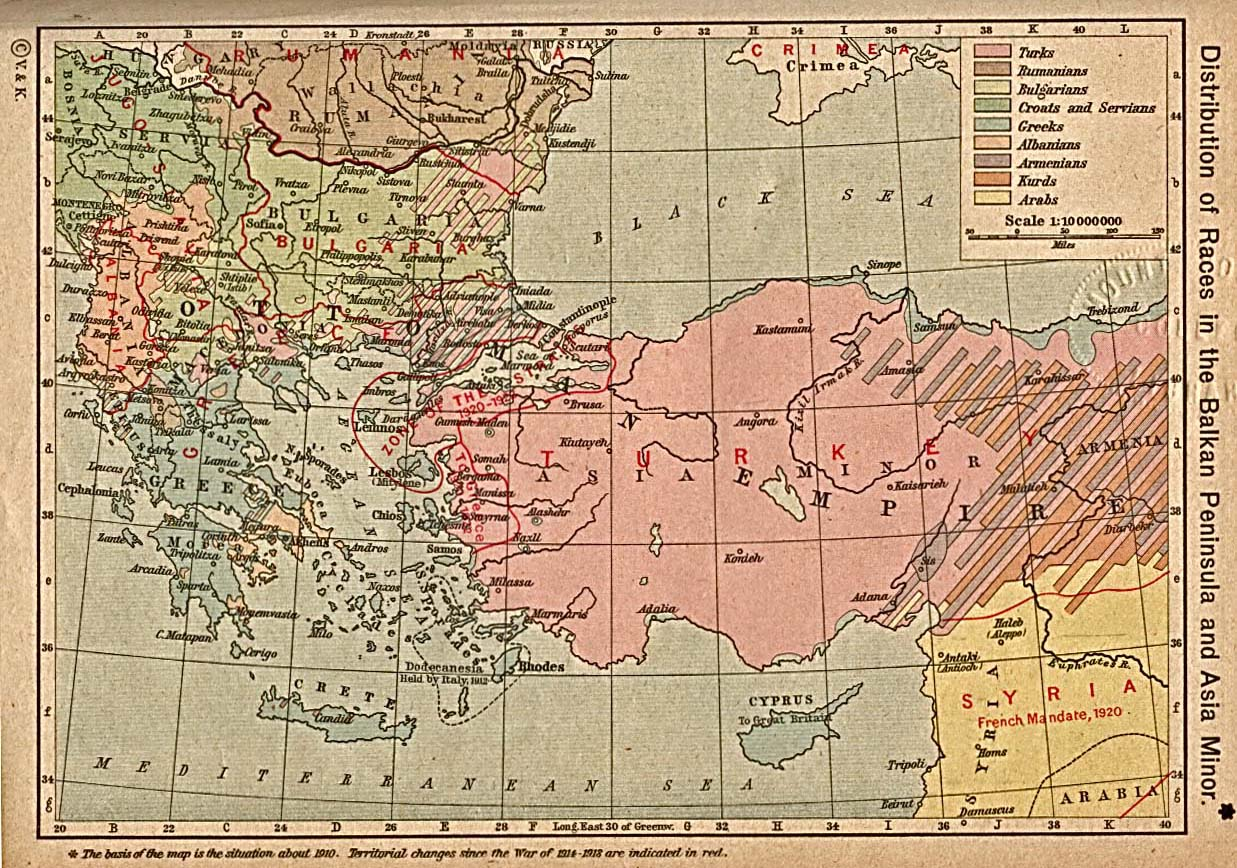
Distribution of Races in the Balkan Peninsula and Asia Minor in 1923, William R. Shepherd Atlas

- The 1921 Kingdom of Serbs, Croats and Slovenes population census for the territories comprising modern-day Kosovo listed 439,010 inhabitants:

By religion:

- Muslims: 329,502 (75.1%)
- Eastern Orthodox Serbs: 93,203 (21.2%)
- Roman Catholics: 15,785 (3.6%)
- Jews: 427
- Greek Catholics: 26

By native language:

- Albanian: 288,907 (65.8%)
- Serbian or Croatian: 114,095 (26.0%)
- Turkish: 27,915 (6.4%)
- Romanian–Cincarian (Aromanian): 402
- Slovene: 184
- German: 30
- Hungarian: 12

In the Yugoslav census of 1921, Albanians formed the majority population of Kosovo at around 64 percent with some 72 percent belonging to the Muslim faith. Government sponsored colonisation of Kosovo and Vardar Macedonia was initiated in 1920 when on 24 September the Assembly of the Yugoslav Kingdom passed the Decree on the Colonisation of the Southern Provinces of Yugoslavia. The decrees were intended as a reward to former soldiers and chetniks for their service during the Balkan Wars and World War One with incentives offered to settle in Kosovo that allowed them to claim between 5 and 10 hectares of land. The military veterans that settled in Kosovo were known as dobrovoljac (volunteers) and were a politically reliable group for the state. The colonisation process also entailed the arrival of Serbian bureaucrats to Kosovo along with their families. During 1919–1928 some 13,000 to 15,914 Serbian families came to live in Kosovo as stipulated to the conditions of the decrees. Between 1918 and 1923, as a result of state policies 30,000 and 40,000 mainly Muslim Albanians migrated to the Turkish regions of İzmir and Anatolia. According to Antonio Baldacci, the Yugoslav census of 1921 significantly underestimated the number of Albanians living in Kosovo.

=== 1931 census ===
- According to the 1931 Kingdom of Yugoslavia population census, there were 552,064 inhabitants in today's Kosovo.

By religion:

- Muslims: 379,981 (68.83%)
- Orthodox Serbs: 150,745 (27.31%)
- Roman Catholics: 20,568 (3.73%)
- Evangelists: 114 (0.02%)
- other: 656 (0.12%)
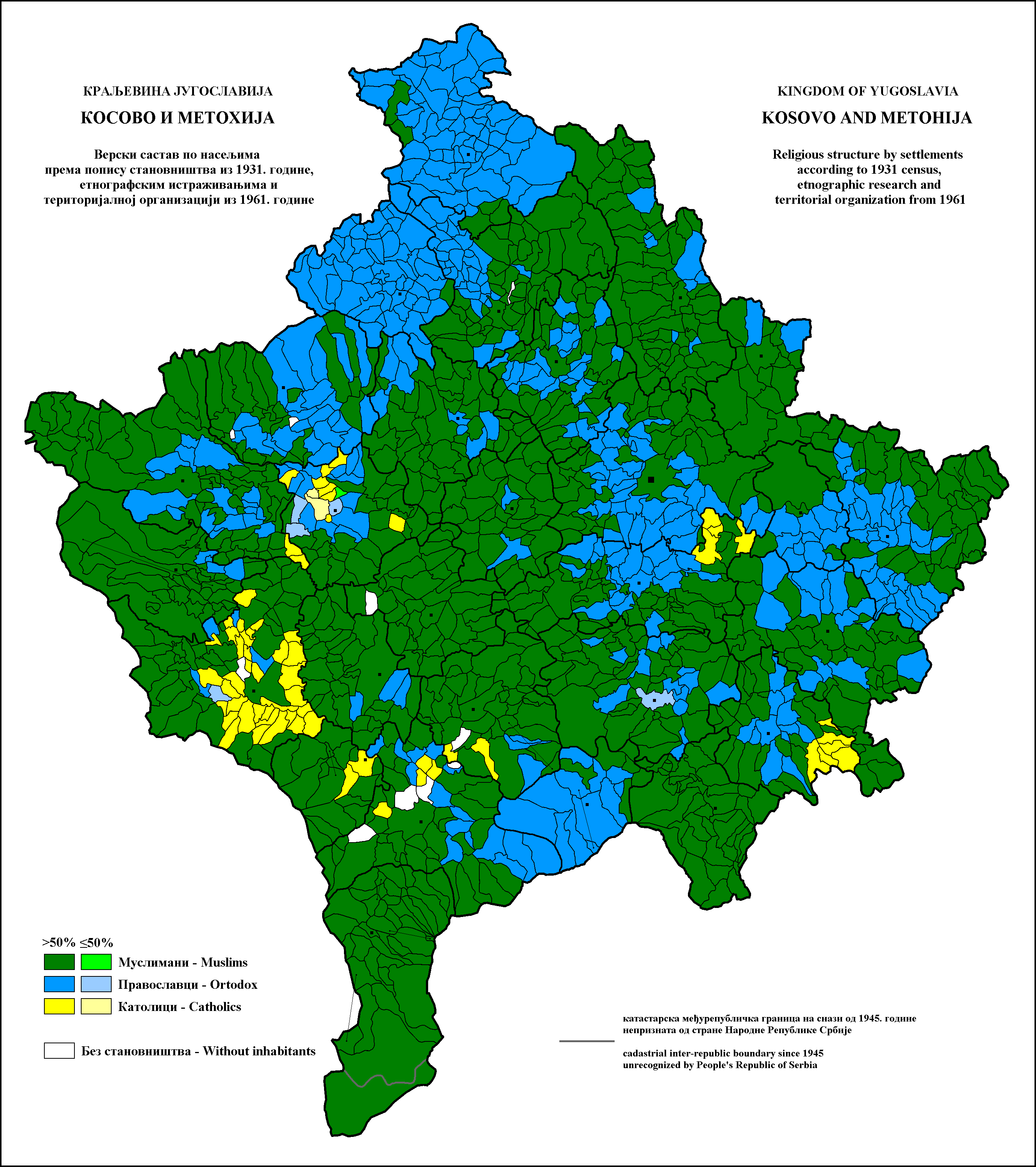
Religious structure of Kosovo by settlements 1931 (territorial organization from 1961)

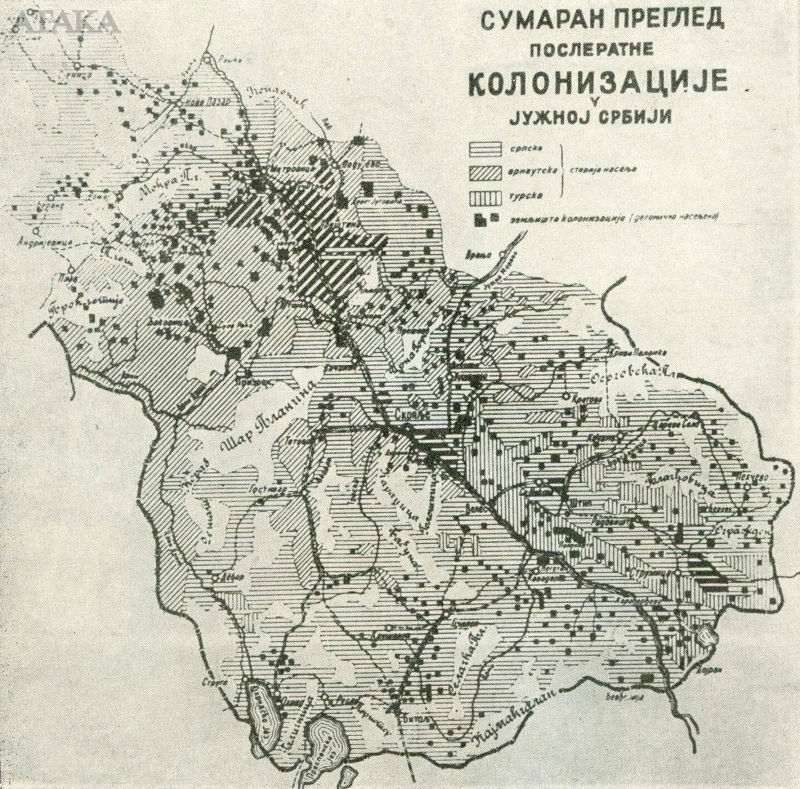
Serbian colonisation in Kosovo and Vardar Macedonia between 1920 and 1930. Colonised areas are in thick hatched black lines and colonised settlements are shown as black squares

By native language:

- Albanians: 331,549 (60.06%)
- Serbs, Croats, Slovenes and Macedonians: 180,170 (32.64%)
- Hungarians: 426 (0.08%)
- Germans: 241 (0.04%)
- other Slavs: 771 (0.14%)
- other: 38,907 (7.05%)
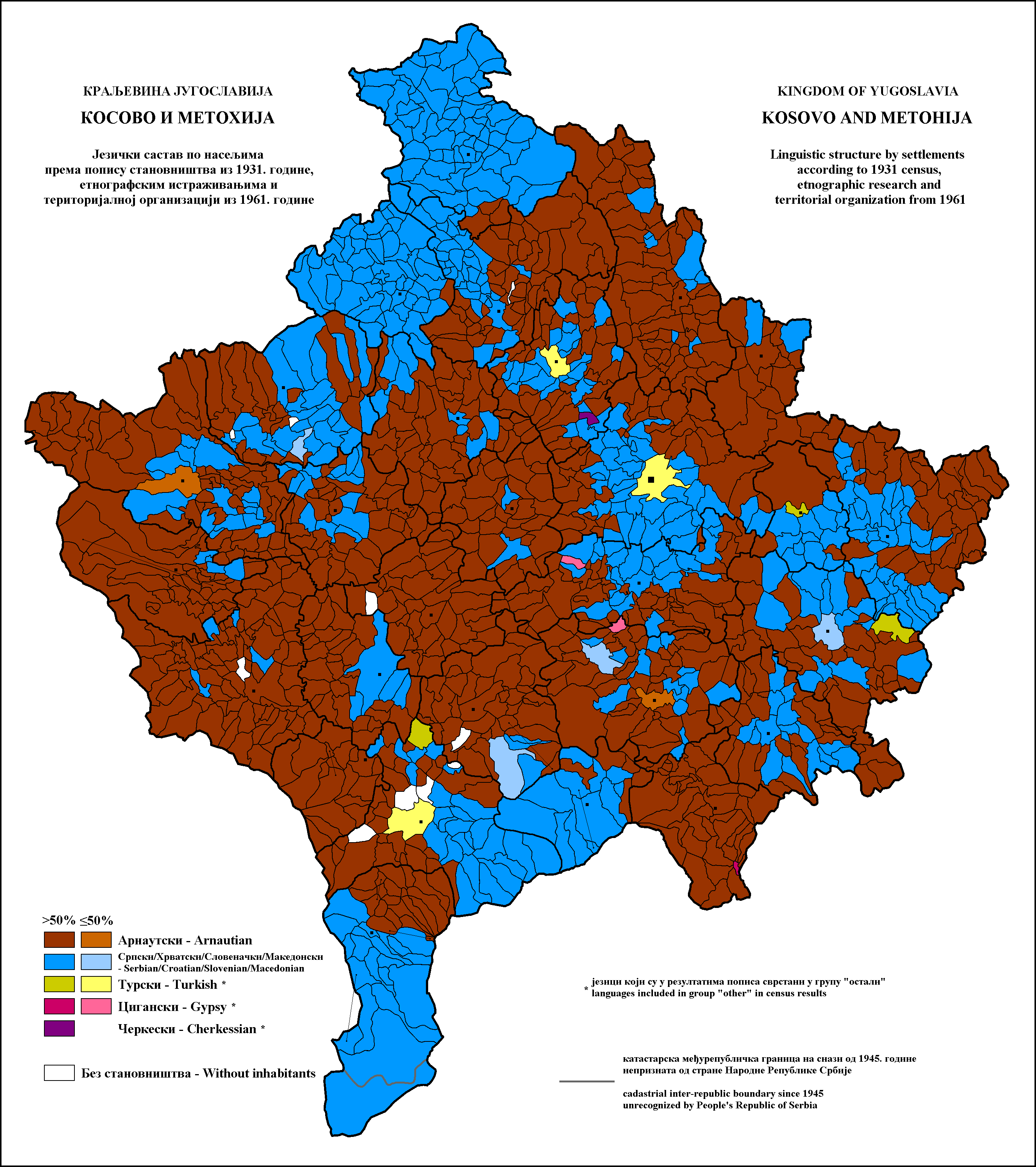
Linguistic structure of Kosovo and Metohija by settlements 1931 (territorial organization from 1961)

By the 1930s, the efforts and attempts at increasing the Serb population had failed as the Yugoslav census (1931) showed Albanians were 62 percent of the Kosovan population. Colonisation had managed to partially change the demographic situation in Kosovo and the share of Albanians had decreased from 65 percent (289,000) in 1921 to 61 percent (337,272) in 1931 and Serbs increased from 28 percent (114,000) to 32 percent (178,848). State authorities attempted to decrease the Albanian population through "forced migration", a process that grew during the decade. The second phase of Yugoslav colonisation began in 1931, when the Decree on the Colonisation of the Southern Regions was issued on 11 July. This phase of colonisation was considered unsuccessful because only 60 to 80 thousand people (some 17–20 thousand families) showed a willingness to become settlers and gained land, of whom many failed to follow through.

Based in Ankara, the data gathered for 1919–1940 by the Yugoslav Legation shows 215,412 Albanians migrated to Turkey, whereas data collected by the Yugoslav army shows that until 1939, 4,046 Albanian families went to live in Albania. For 1918 to 1921, Sabrina Ramet cites the estimate that the expulsions of Albanians reduced their numbers from around 800,000 – 1,000,000 within Kosovo down to some 439,500. Between 1923 and 1939, some 115,000 Yugoslav citizens migrated to Turkey and both Yugoslavian and Turkish sources state that Albanians composed most of that population group. Yugoslav sources downplayed the number of Albanians who left the region. Official Yugoslav sources claimed that between 1927 and 1939 some 23,601 Muslims from Kosovo left for Turkey (19,279) and Albania (4,322). The exact number of Albanians who were expelled is difficult to determine but between 200,000 and 300,000 migrants moved from Yugoslavia mostly to Turkey between WWI and WWII. From 1923 to 1939, Albanians comprised about 100,000 in the total population which left Yugoslavia.

Albanian scholars from Albania and Kosovo place the number of Albanian refugees from 300,000 upward into the hundreds of thousands and state that they left Yugoslavia due to duress. Other estimates given by scholars outside the Balkans for Kosovan Albanians that emigrated during 1918–1941 are between 90,000 and 150,000 or 200,000–300,000. To date, access is unavailable to the Turkish Foreign Ministry archive regarding this issue and as such the total numbers of Albanians arriving to Turkey during the interwar period are difficult to determine.

== World War II ==
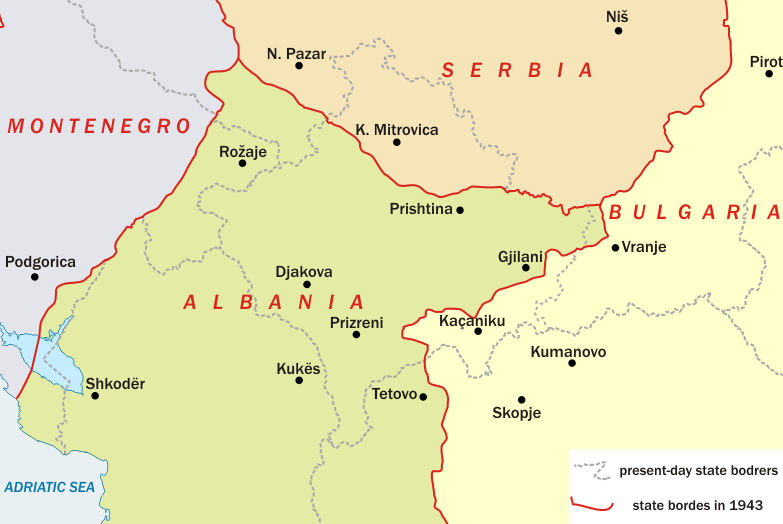
Kosovo in 1941

During World War II, a large area of Kosovo was attached to Italian controlled Albania. Kosovo Albanians sought to redress the past policies of colonisation and Slavization and power relations between Albanians and Serbs were overturned in the new administration. It resulted in local Serbs and other Serbs that had arrived previously as part of the colonisation plan to be targeted by groups of armed Albanians. Campaigns aimed toward Serbs followed and included the destruction of property, killings, murders and deportations. The majority of Montenegrin and Serb settlers consisting of bureaucrats and dobrovoljac fled from Kosovo to Axis occupied Serbia or Montenegro. One estimate places the number of Serbs that were forced to leave at 70,000-100,000. Serbian historiography estimates that some 100,000 Serbs left Kosovo during 1941–1945. Other Serb sources place the number at 250,000. During this period, Vickers estimates the Italian occupation force facilitated the settlement of up to 72,000 Albanians from Albania to Kosovo.

A three-dimensional conflict ensued, involving inter-ethnic, ideological, and international affiliations, with the first being most important. Nonetheless, these conflicts were relatively low-level compared with other areas of Yugoslavia during the war years, with one Serb historian estimating that 3,000 Albanians and 4,000 Serbs and Montenegrins were killed, and two others estimating war dead at 12,000 Albanians and 10,000 Serbs and Montenegrins. An official investigation conducted by the Yugoslav government in 1964 recorded nearly 8,000 war-related fatalities in Kosovo between 1941 and 1945, 5,489 of whom were Serb and Montenegrin and 2,177 of whom were Albanian.

== Communist Yugoslavia ==
Following the Second World War and establishment of communist rule in Yugoslavia, the colonisation programme was discontinued, as President Tito wanted to avoid sectarian and ethnic conflicts. Tito enacted a temporary decree in March 1945 that banned the return of colonists, which included some Chetniks and the rest that left during the war seeking refuge. Two weeks later Tito issued another decree and followed it with a law in August 1945 that permitted a conditional return for a minority of the colonists. In total, cases of return numbered 11,168, with 4,829 cases confirmed, 5,744 cases partially confirmed alongside 595 cases being denied. A small proportion of the previous colonist population came back to Kosovo and repossessed land, with a greater part of their number (4,000 families) later leaving for other areas of Yugoslavia. From 1945 to 1948, the Yugoslav government opened the border to Albania with an estimated 25,000 Albanians crossing over and settling in Kosovo. The majority of these post-war migrants were family members of Albanians settled in Kosovo during the Second World War by the Italian occupation force.

After the Second World War and the Yugoslavia-Albania split, Yugoslav authorities attempted to downplay links between Albanians of Albania and Kosovo and to implement a policy of "Turkification" that encouraged Turkish language education and emigration to Turkey among Albanians. In 1953, an agreement was reached between Tito and Mehmet Fuat Köprülü, the foreign minister of Turkey that promoted the emigration of Albanians to Anatolia. Forced migration to Turkey increased and numbers cited by Klejda Mulaj for 1953–1957 are 195,000 Albanians leaving Yugoslavia and for 1966, some 230,000 people. Historian Noel Malcolm placed the number of Albanians leaving for Turkey at 100,000 between 1953 and 1966. Factors involved in the upsurge of migration were intimidation and pressure toward the Albanian population to leave through a campaign headed by Yugoslav police chief Aleksandar Ranković that officially was stated as aimed at curbing Albanian nationalism. Kosovo under the control of Ranković was viewed by Turkey as the individual that would implement "the Gentleman's Agreement". At the same time, a new phase of colonisation occurred in the region as Montenegrin and Serb families were installed in Kosovo. The situation ended in 1966 with the removal of Ranković from his position.

From 1961 to 1981, the ethnic Albanian population of Kosovo almost doubled as a result of high birth rates, illegal migration from communist Albania and rapid urbanisation. Throughout the same period, the population of ethnic Serbs of Kosovo reduced by half, stimulated by an exodus of ethnic Serbs from the region.

=== Censuses ===
==== 1948 census ====
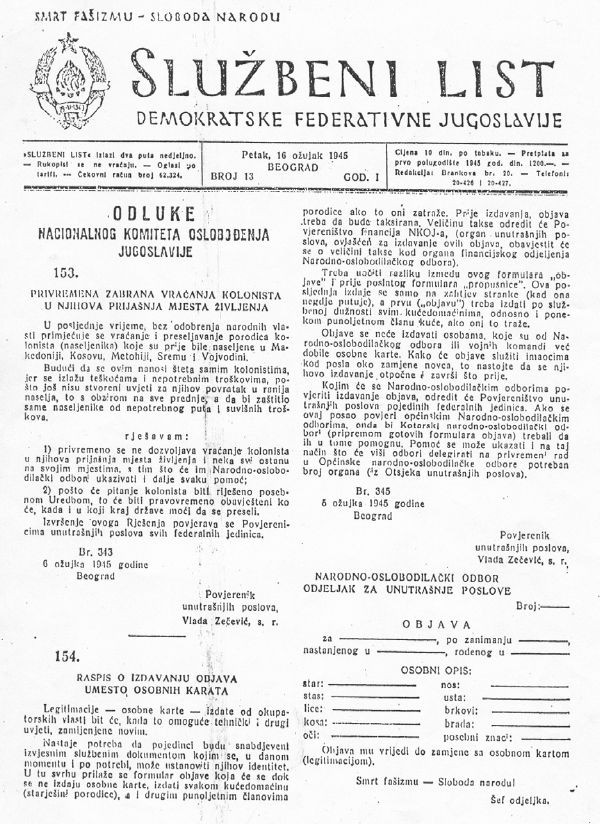
In 1945, the decree temporarily banning the return of the colonists was published in the government periodical Službeni list

727,820 total inhabitants

- 498,242 Albanians (68.46%)
- 171,911 Serbs (23.62%)
- 28,050 Montenegrins (3.86%)
- 11,230 Roma (1.54%)
- 5,290 Croats (0.73%)
- 1,315 Turks (0.18%)
- 526 Macedonians (0.07%)
- 362 Russians (0.05%)
- 283 Slovenes (0.04%)
- 197 Germans (0.03%)
- 83 Hungarians (0.01%)
- 77 Bulgarians (0.01%)
- 39 Italians
- 31 Rusyns
- 29 Czechs
- 18 Romanians
- 2 Slovaks
- 9,679 undecided Muslims (1.33%)
- 456 other and unknown (0.06%)

==== 1953 census ====
808,141 total inhabitants

- 524,559 Albanians (64.91%)
- 189,969 Serbs (23.51%)
- 34,583 Turks (4.28%)
- 31,343 Montenegrins (3.88%)
- 6,201 Croat (0.77%)
- 972 Macedonians (0.12%)
- 411 Slovenes (0.05%)
- 6,241 undecided Yugoslav (0.77%)
- 401 other Slav (0.05%)
- 13,561 others (1.68%)

==== 1961 census ====
963,959 total inhabitants

- 646,604 Albanians (67.08%)
- 227,016 Serbs (23.55%)
- 37,588 Montenegrins (3.9%)
- 8,026 Ethnic Muslims (0.83%)
- 7,251 Croat (0.75%)
- 5,203 Yugoslavs (0.54%)
- 3,202 Romani (0.33%)
- 1,142 Macedonians (0.12%)
- 510 Slovenes (0.05%)
- 210 Hungarians (0.02%)
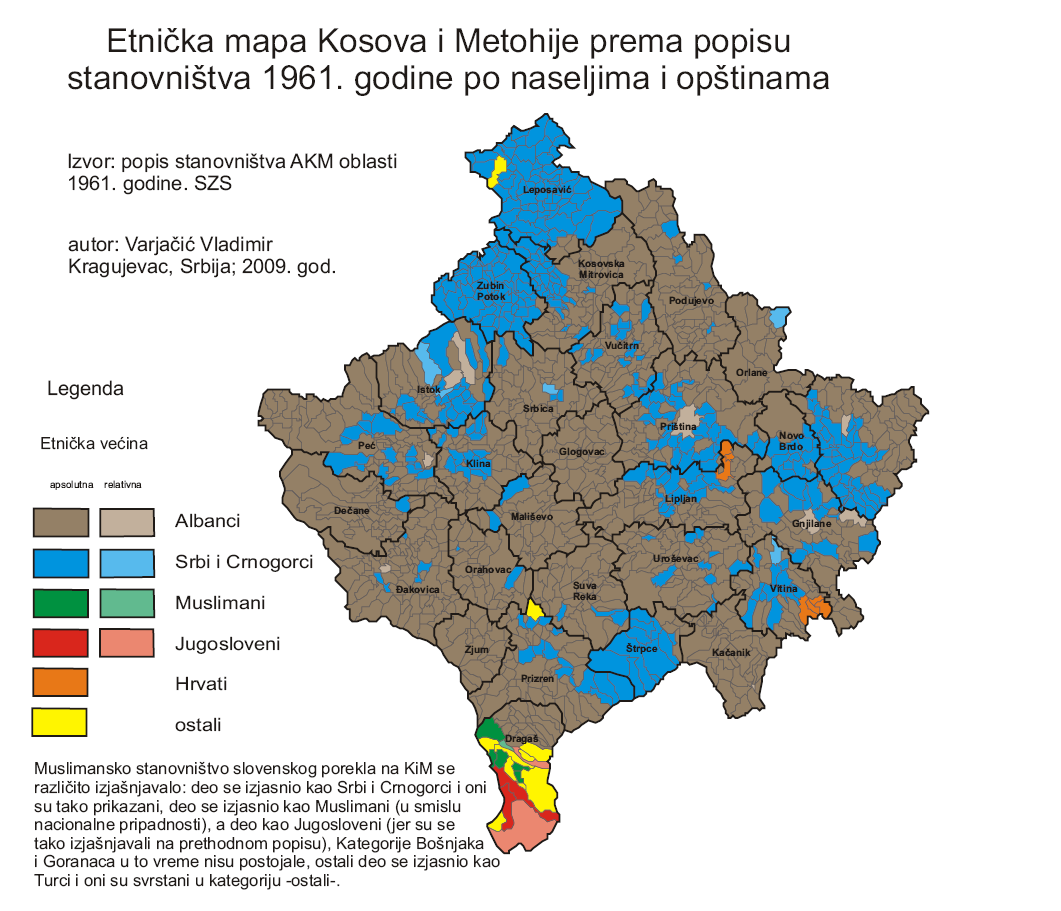
Ethnic structure of Kosovo and Metohija by settlements 1961.

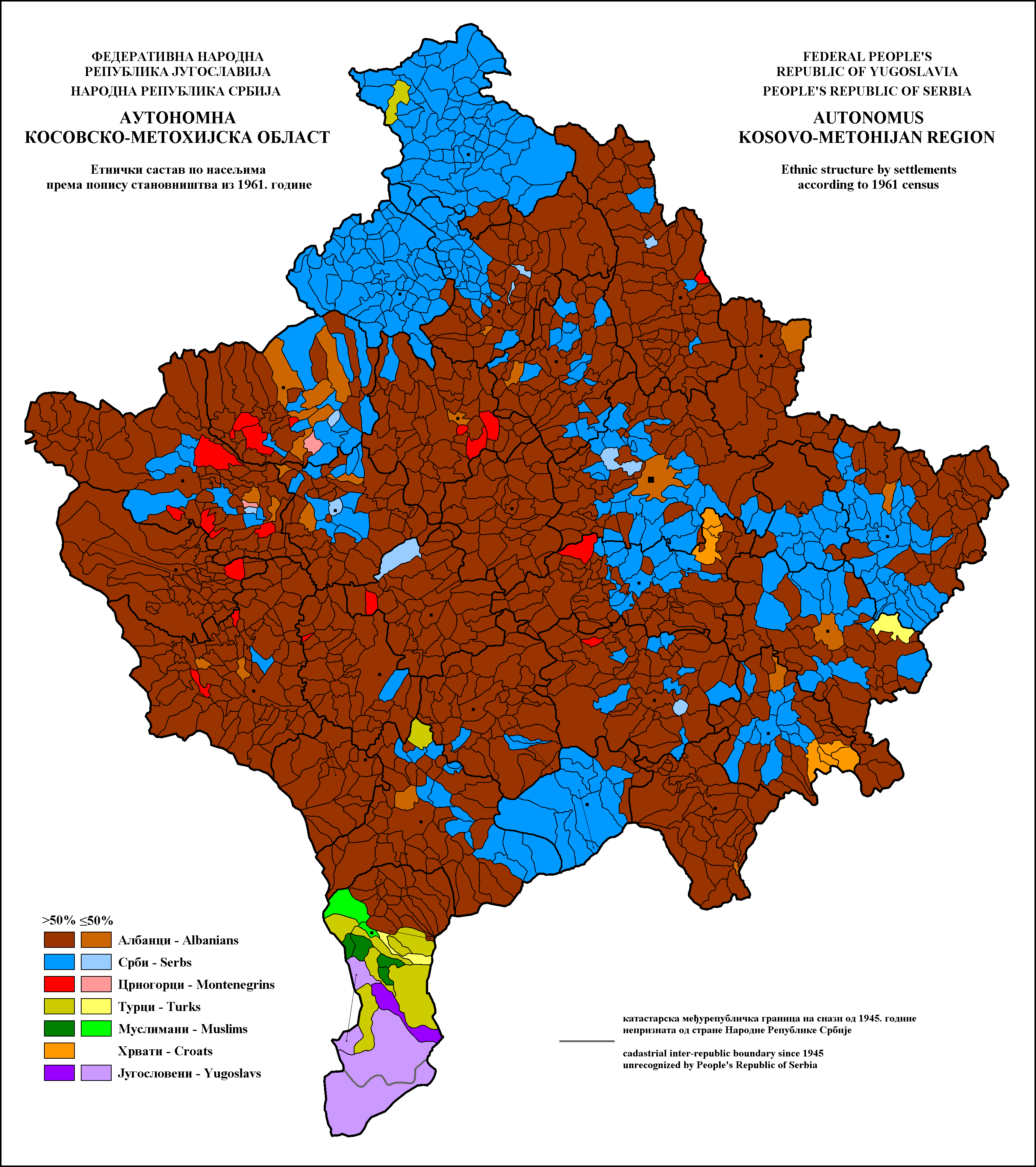
Ethnic structure of Kosovo and Metohija by settlements 1961.

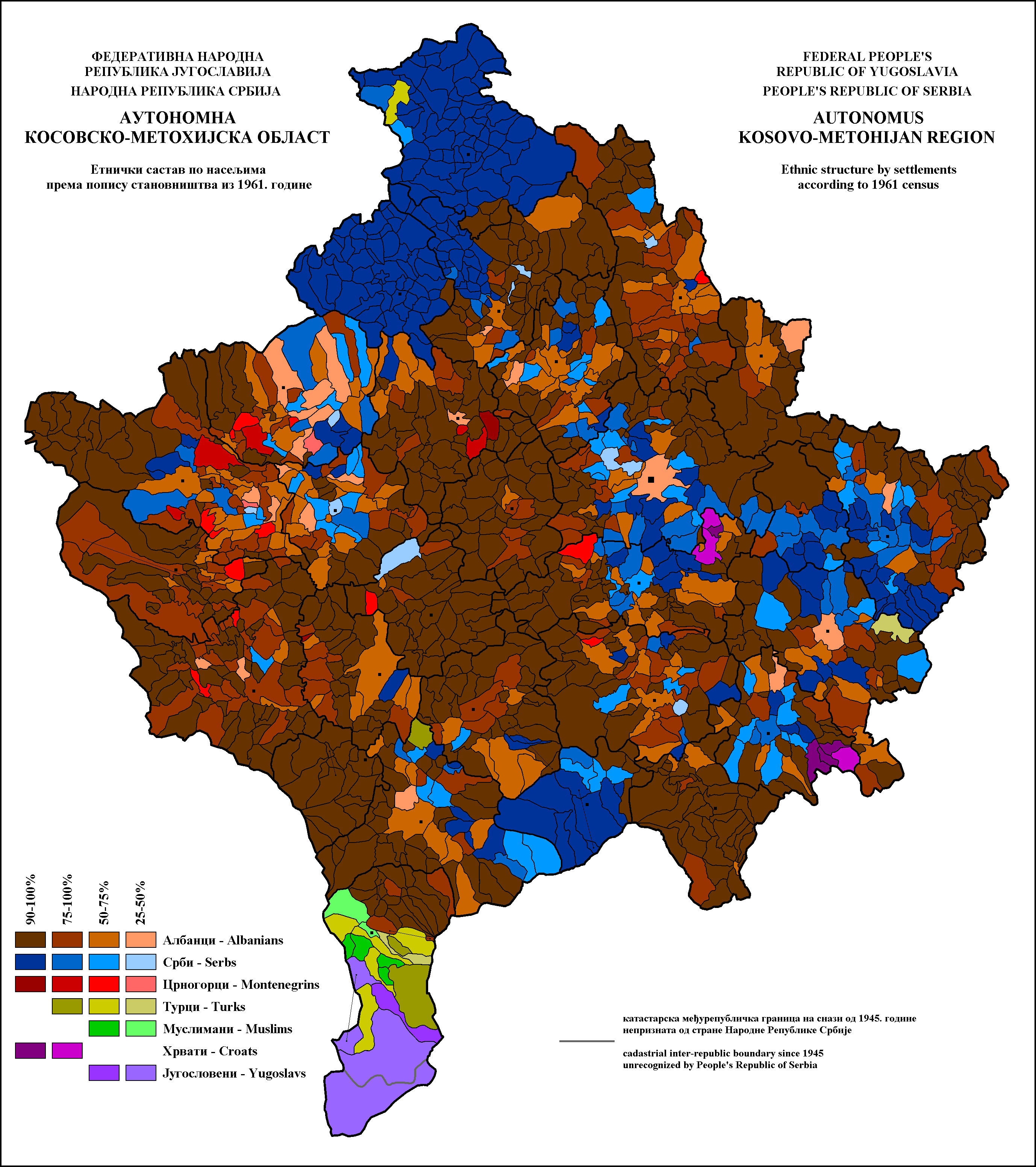
Ethnic structure of Kosovo and Metohija by settlements 1961.

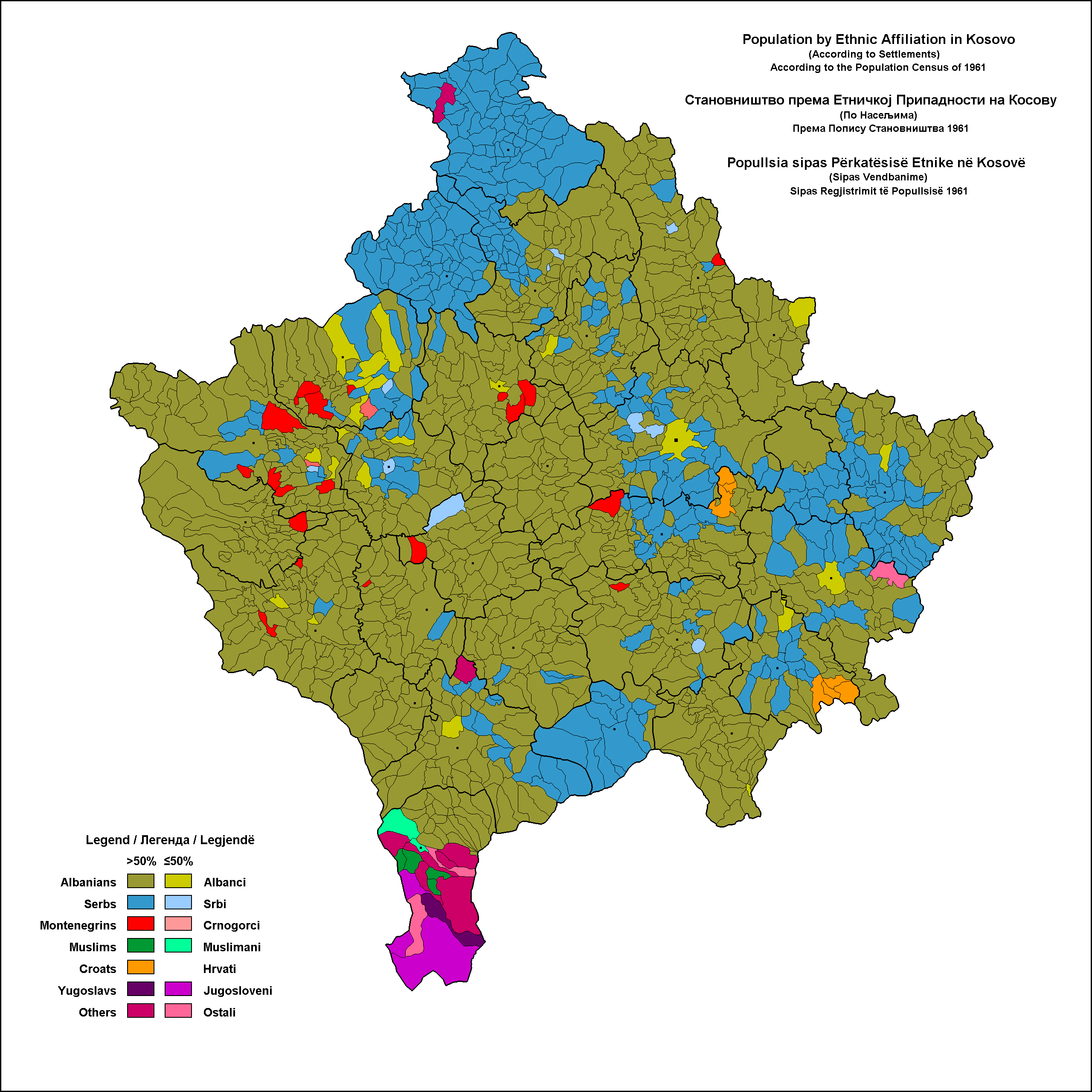
Ethnic structure of Kosovo and Metohija by settlements 1961.

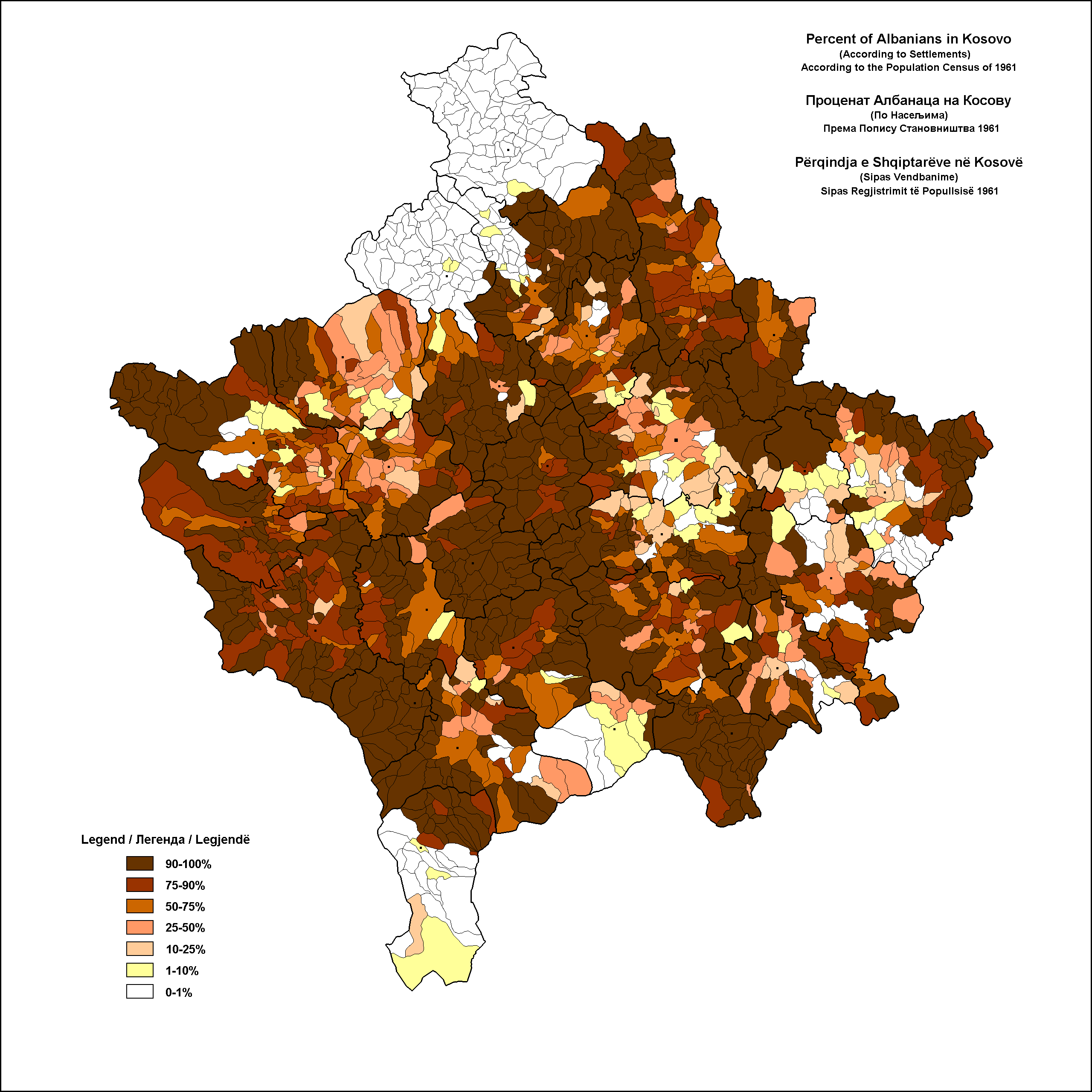
Distribution of Albanians on Kosovo and Metohija by settlements 1961.

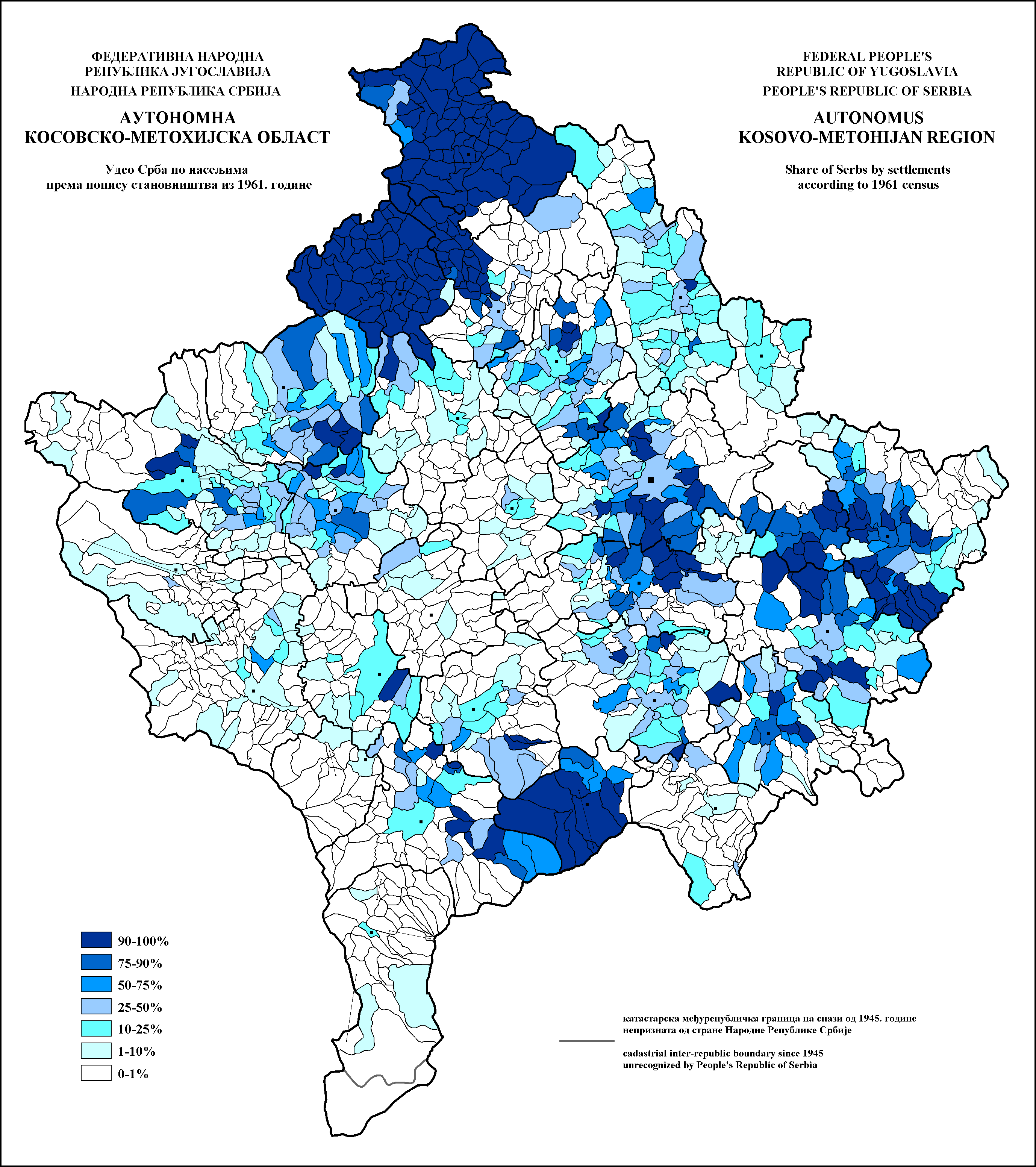
Distribution of Serbs on Kosovo and Metohija by settlements 1961.

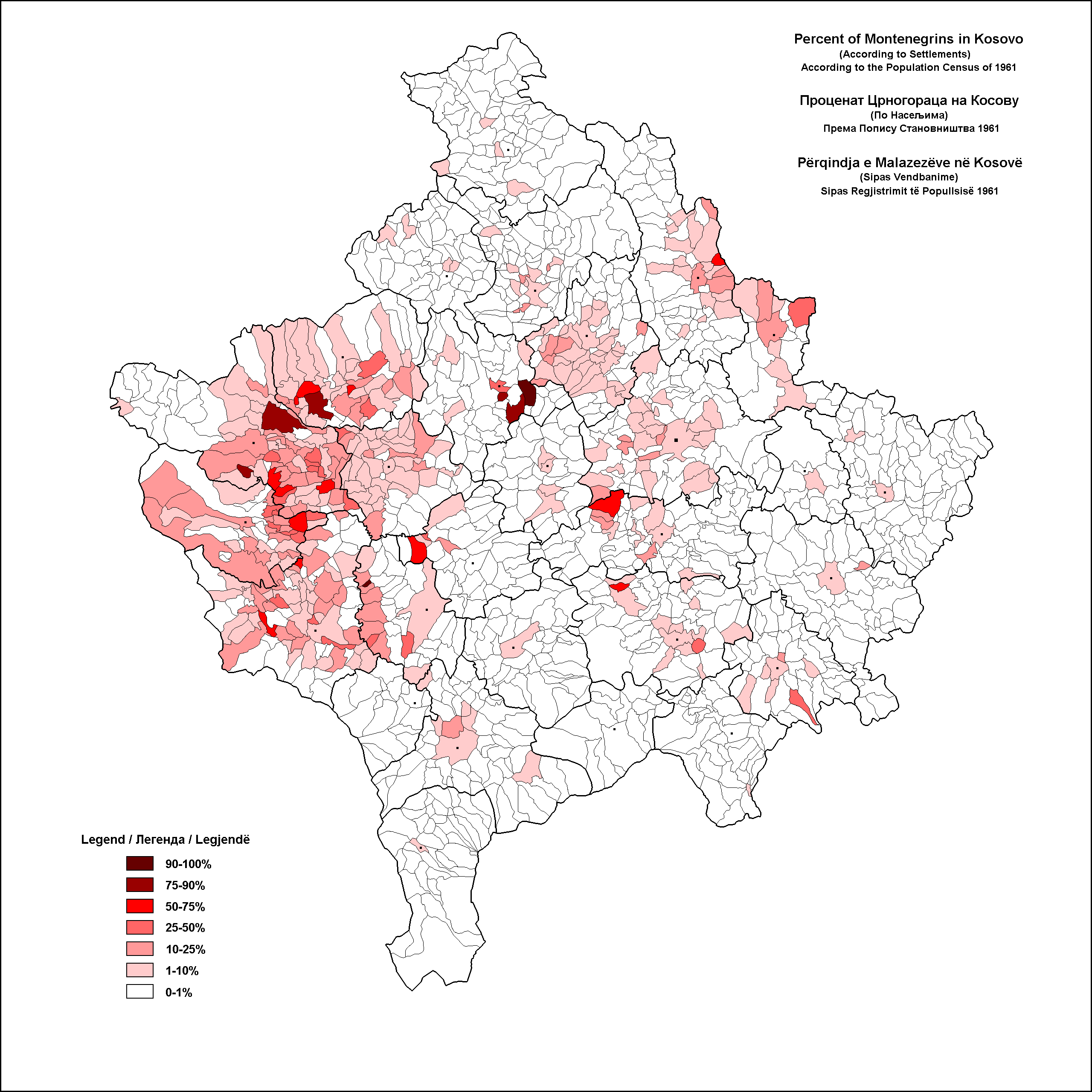
Distribution of Montenegrins on Kosovo and Metohija by settlements 1961.

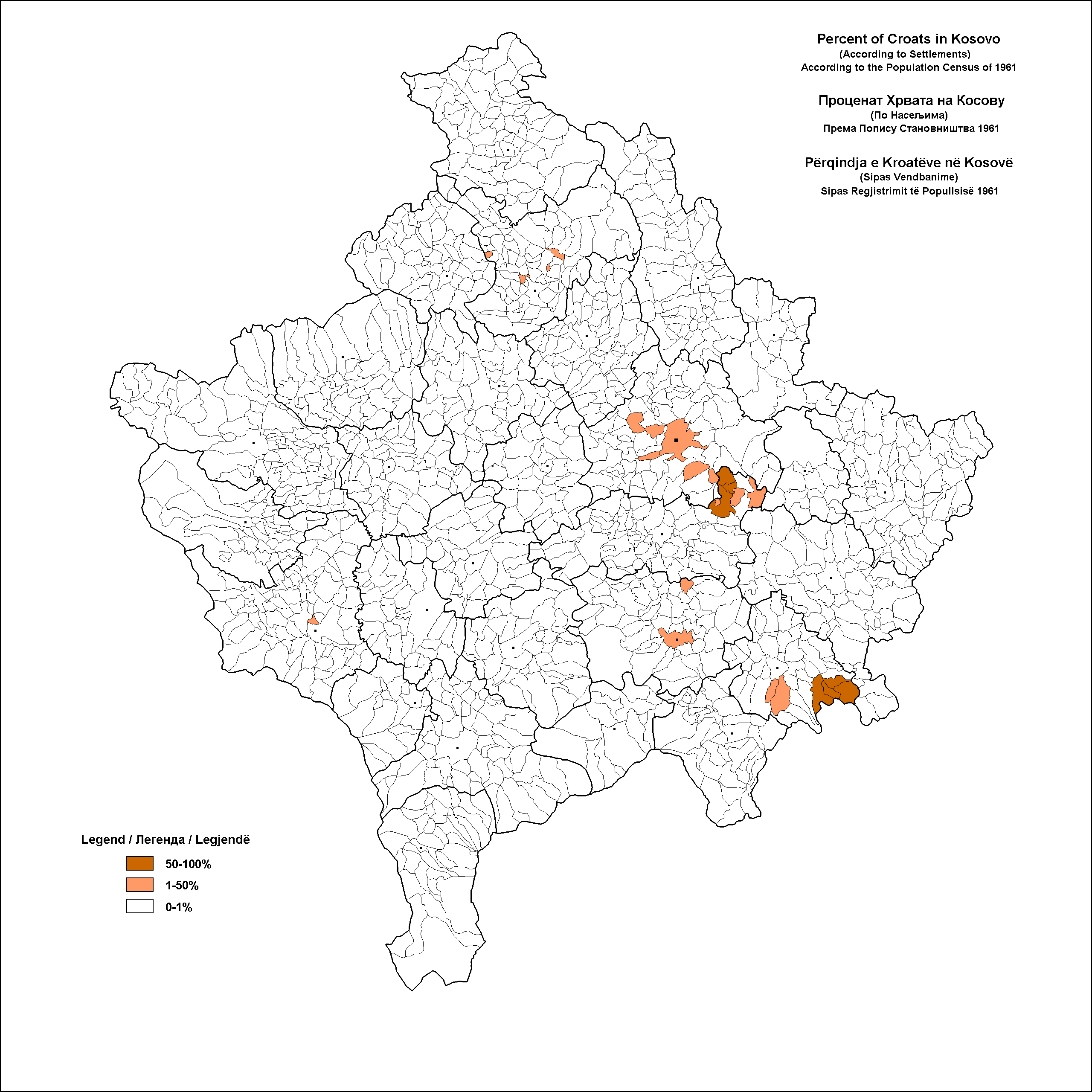
Distribution of Croats on Kosovo and Metohija by settlements 1961.

==== 1971 census ====
1,243,693 total inhabitants

- 916,168 Albanians or 73.7%
- 228,264 Serbs (18.4%)
- 31,555 Montenegrins (2.5%)
- 26,000 Slavic Muslims (2.1%)
- 14,593 Romani (1.2%)
- 12,244 Turks (1.0%)
- 8,000 Croats (0.7%)
- 920 Yugoslavs (0.1%)
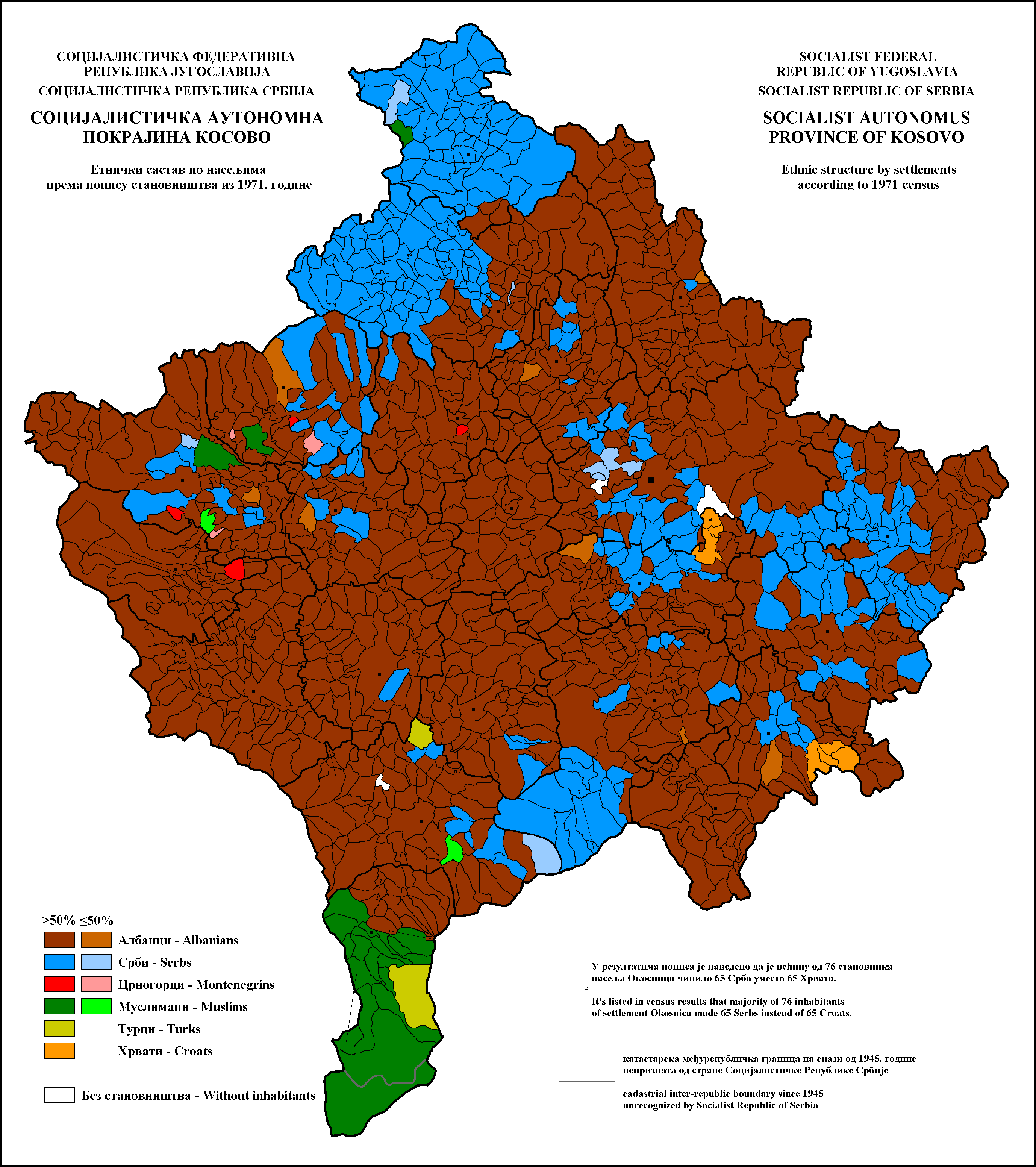
Ethnic structure of Kosovo and Metohija by settlements 1971.

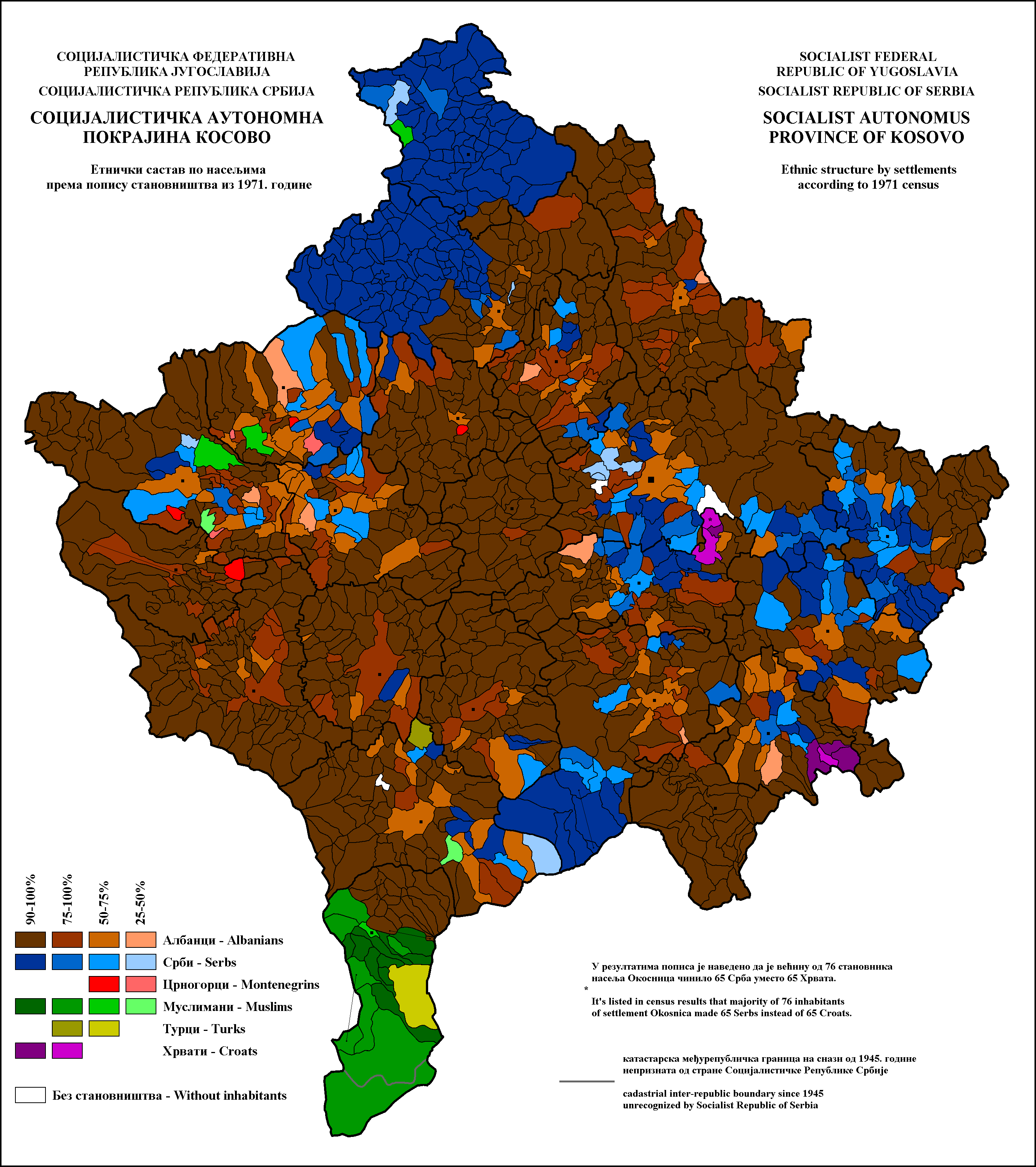
Ethnic structure of Kosovo and Metohija by settlements 1971.

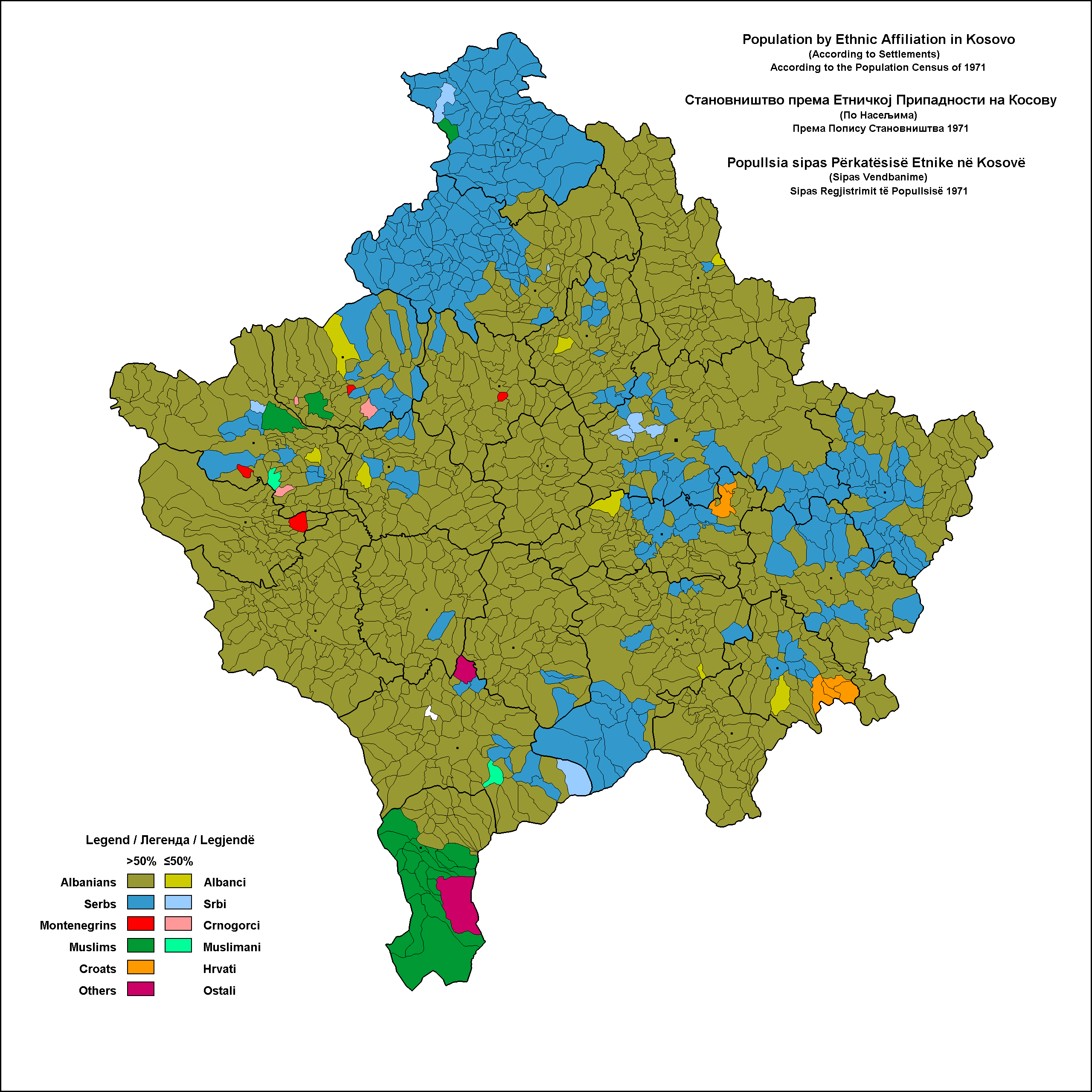
Ethnic structure of Kosovo and Metohija by settlements 1971.

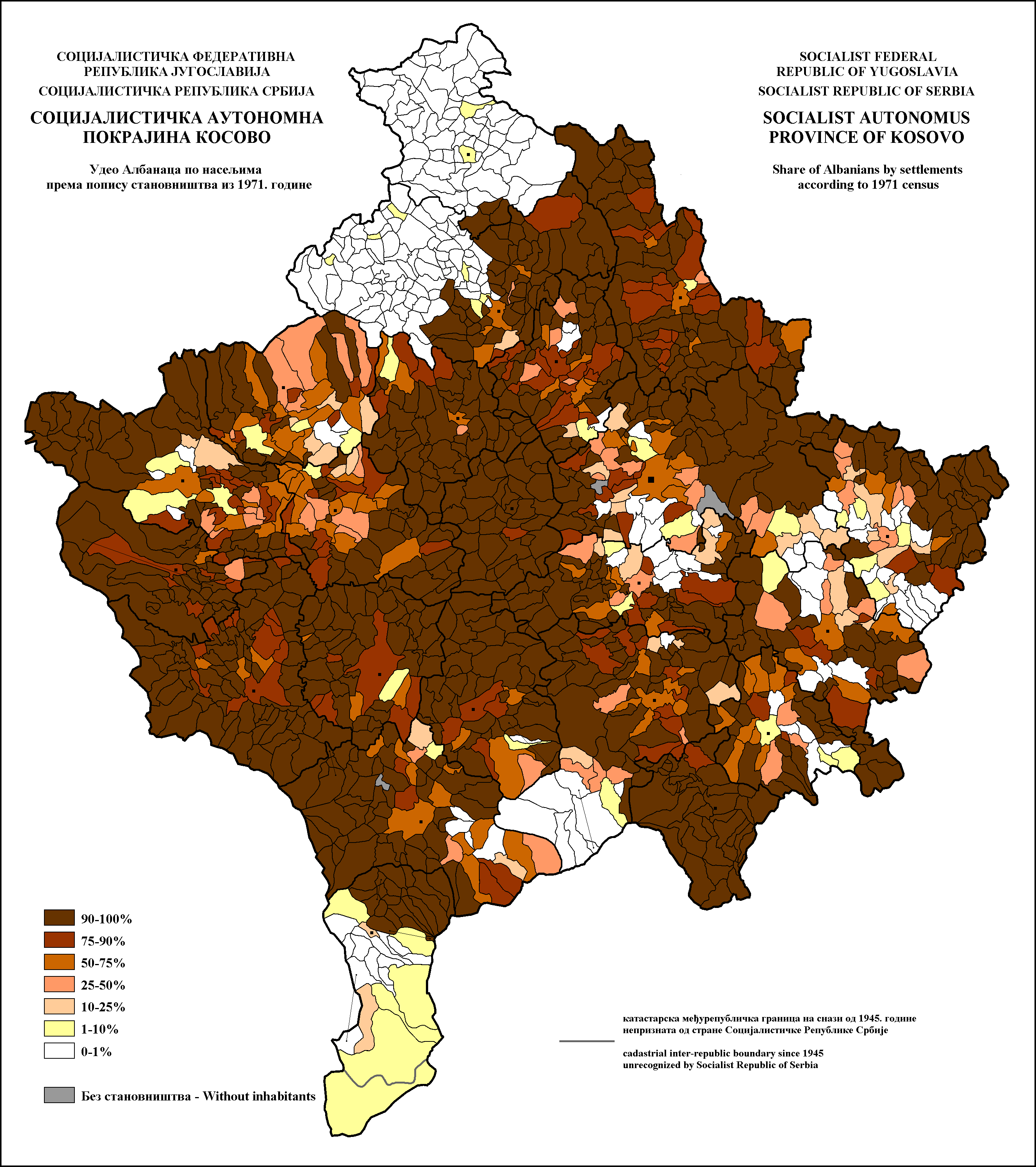
Distribution of Albanians on Kosovo and Metohija by settlements 1971.

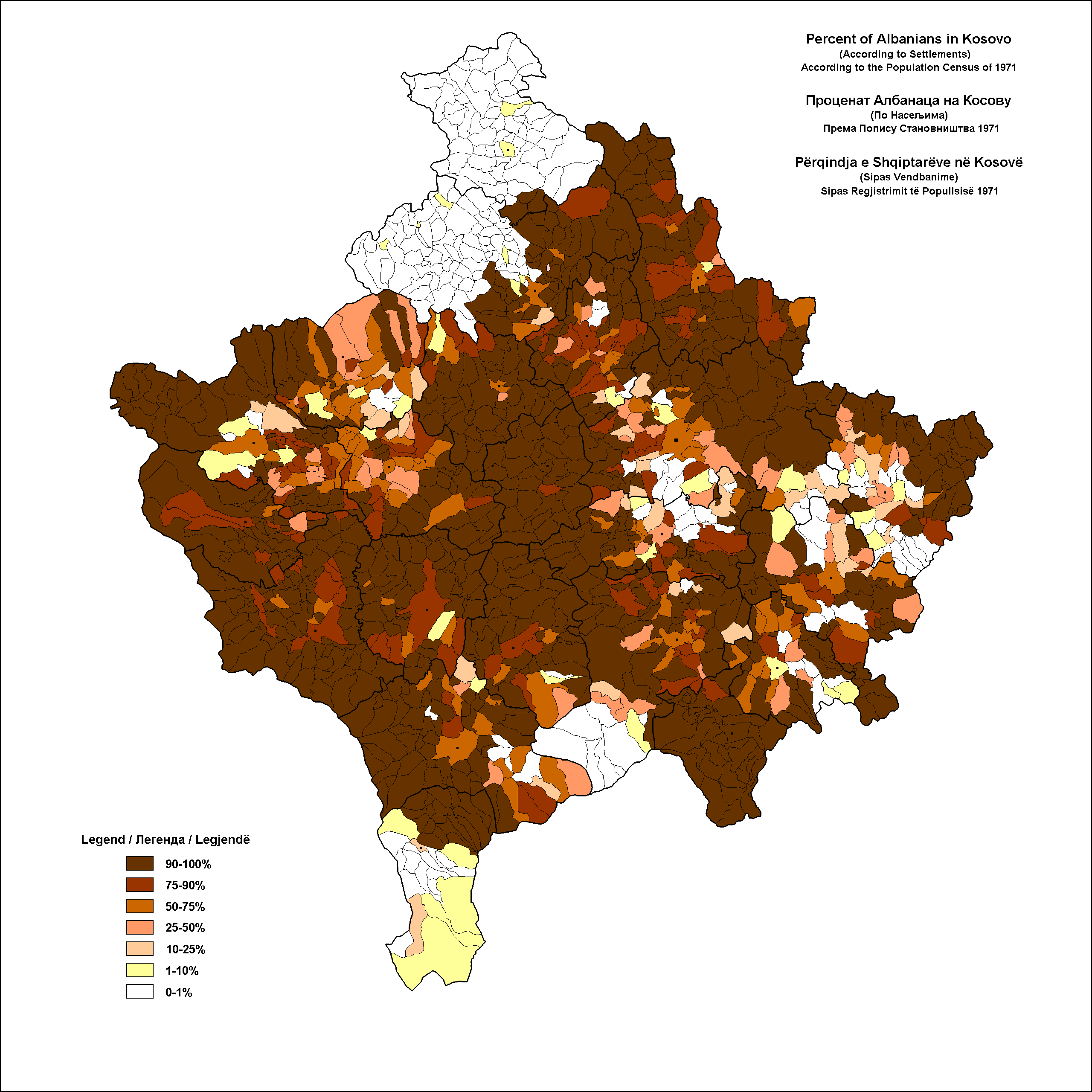
Distribution of Albanians on Kosovo and Metohija by settlements 1971.

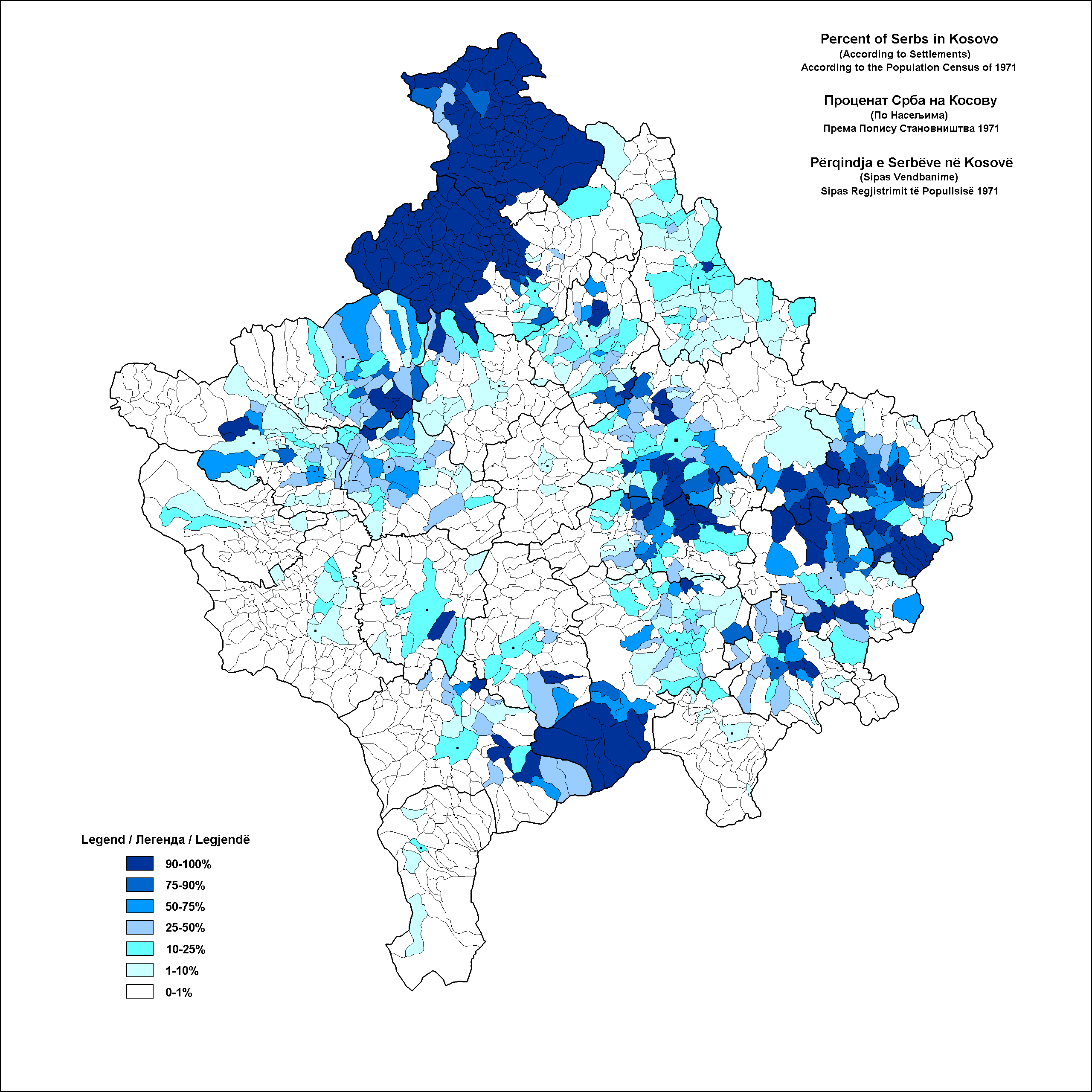
Distribution of Serbs on Kosovo and Metohija by settlements 1971.

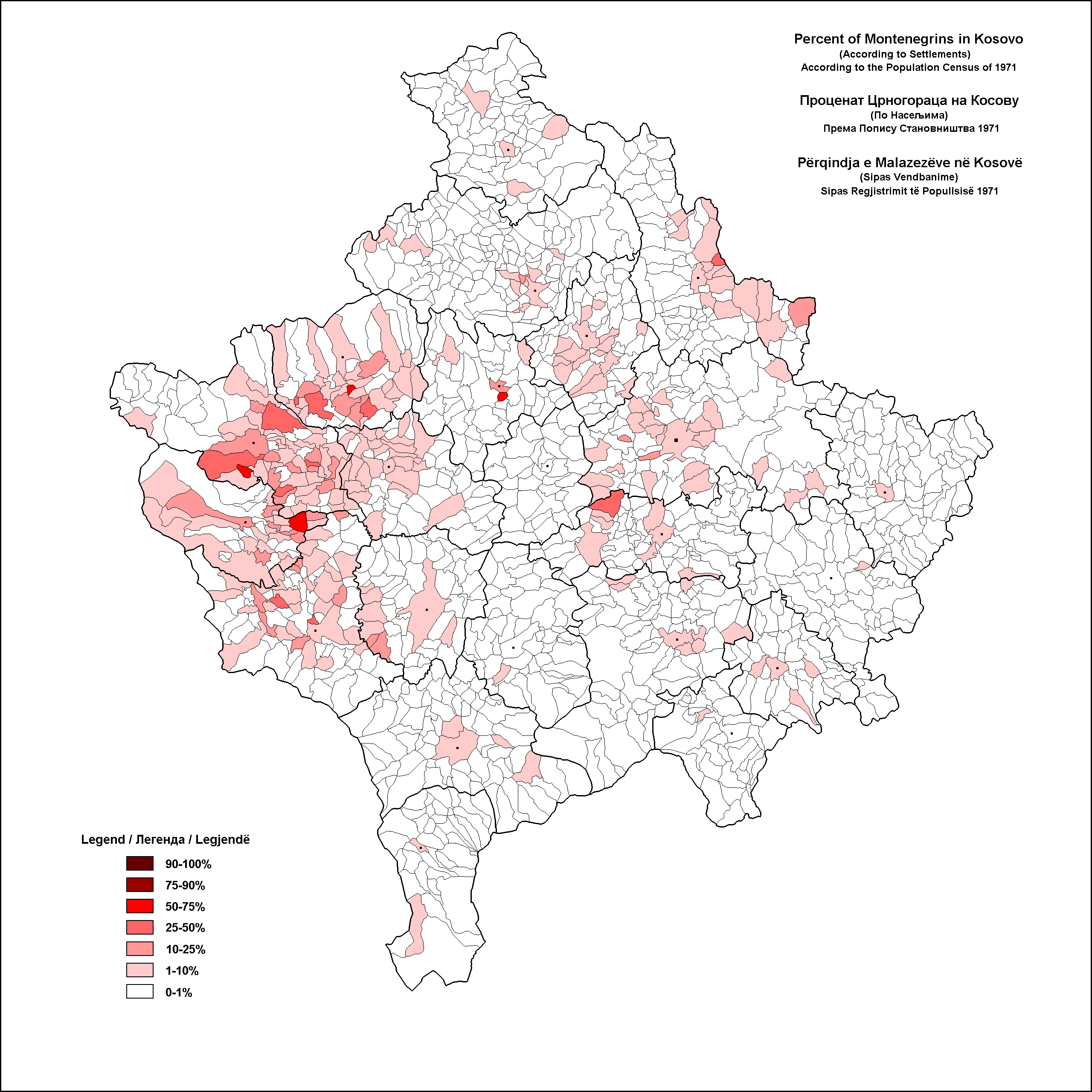
Distribution of Montenegrins on Kosovo and Metohija by settlements 1971.

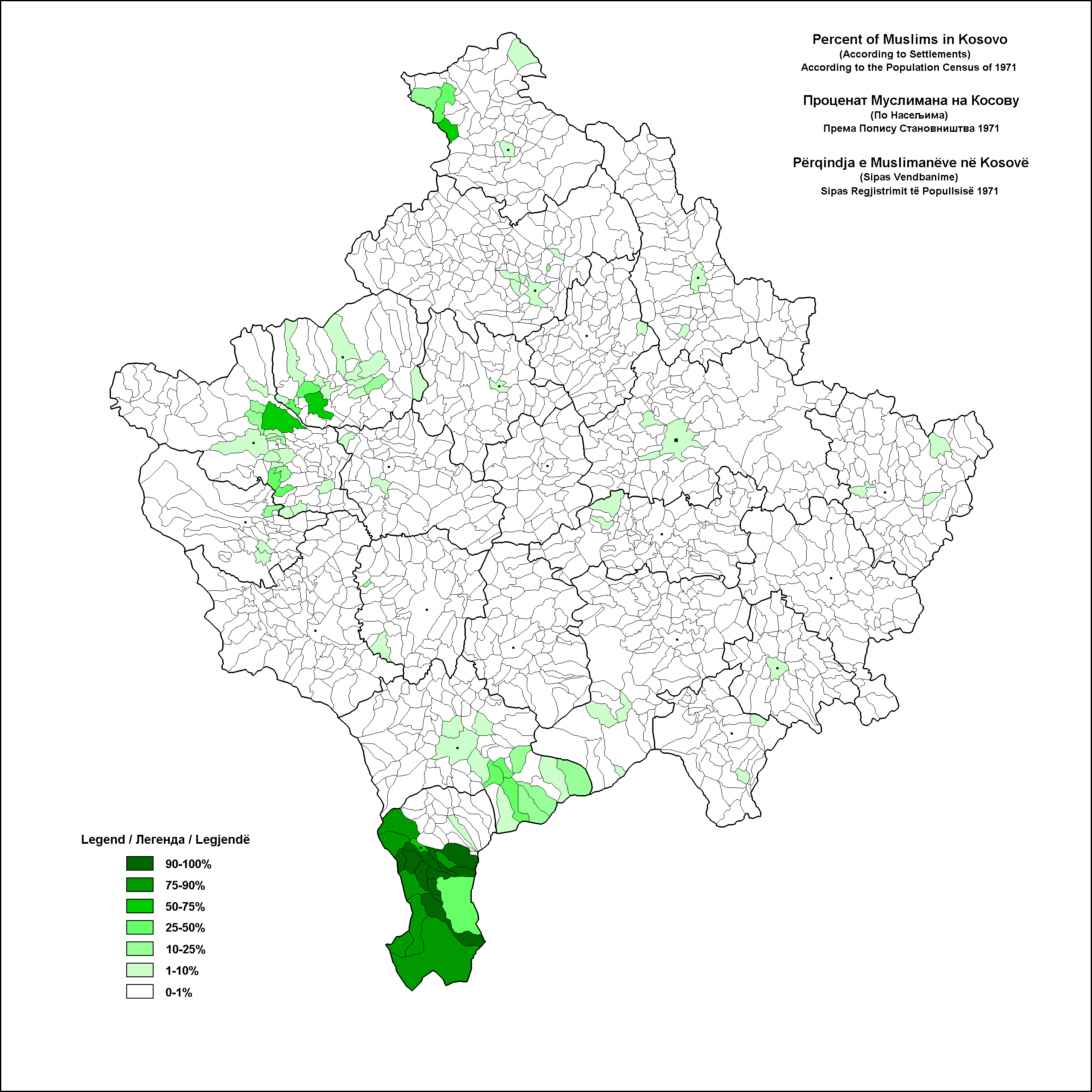
Distribution of Muslims on Kosovo and Metohija by settlements 1971.

==== 1981 census ====
1,584,558 total inhabitants

- 1,226,736 Albanians (77.42%)
- 209,498 Serbs (13.2%)
- 27,028 Montenegrins (1.7%)
- 2,676 Yugoslavs (0.2%)
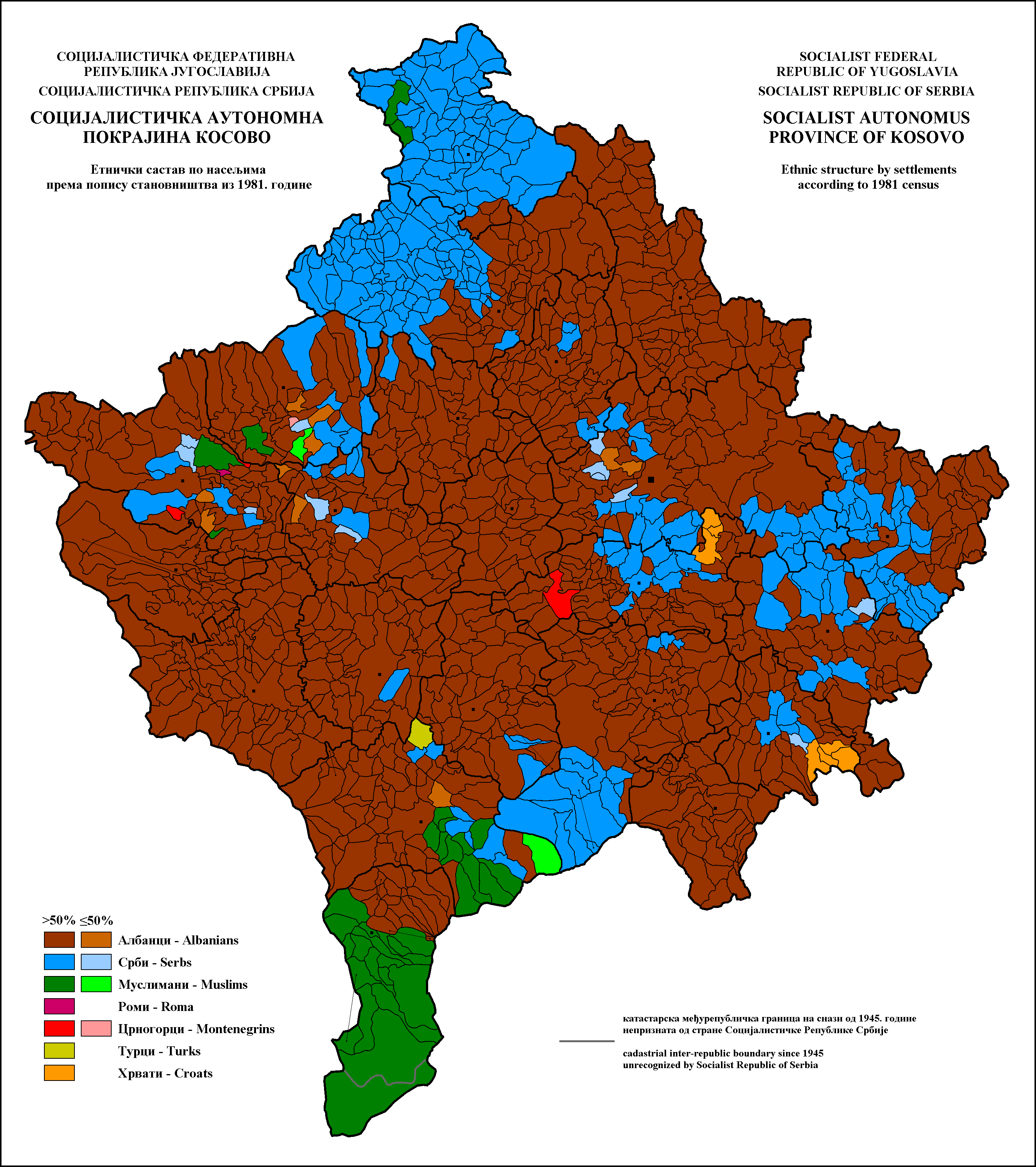
Ethnic structure of Kosovo and Metohija by settlements 1981.

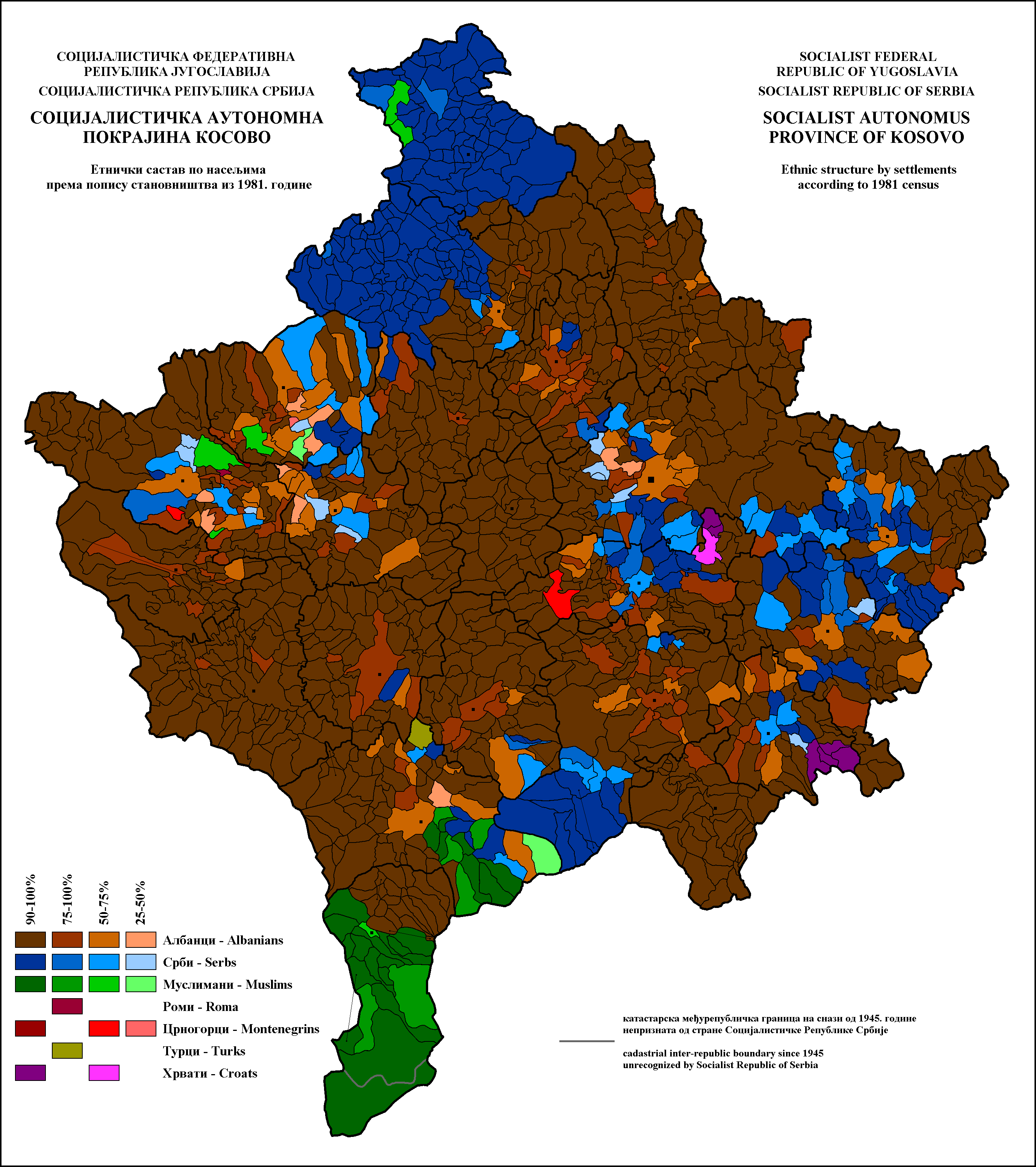
Ethnic structure of Kosovo and Metohija by settlements 1981.

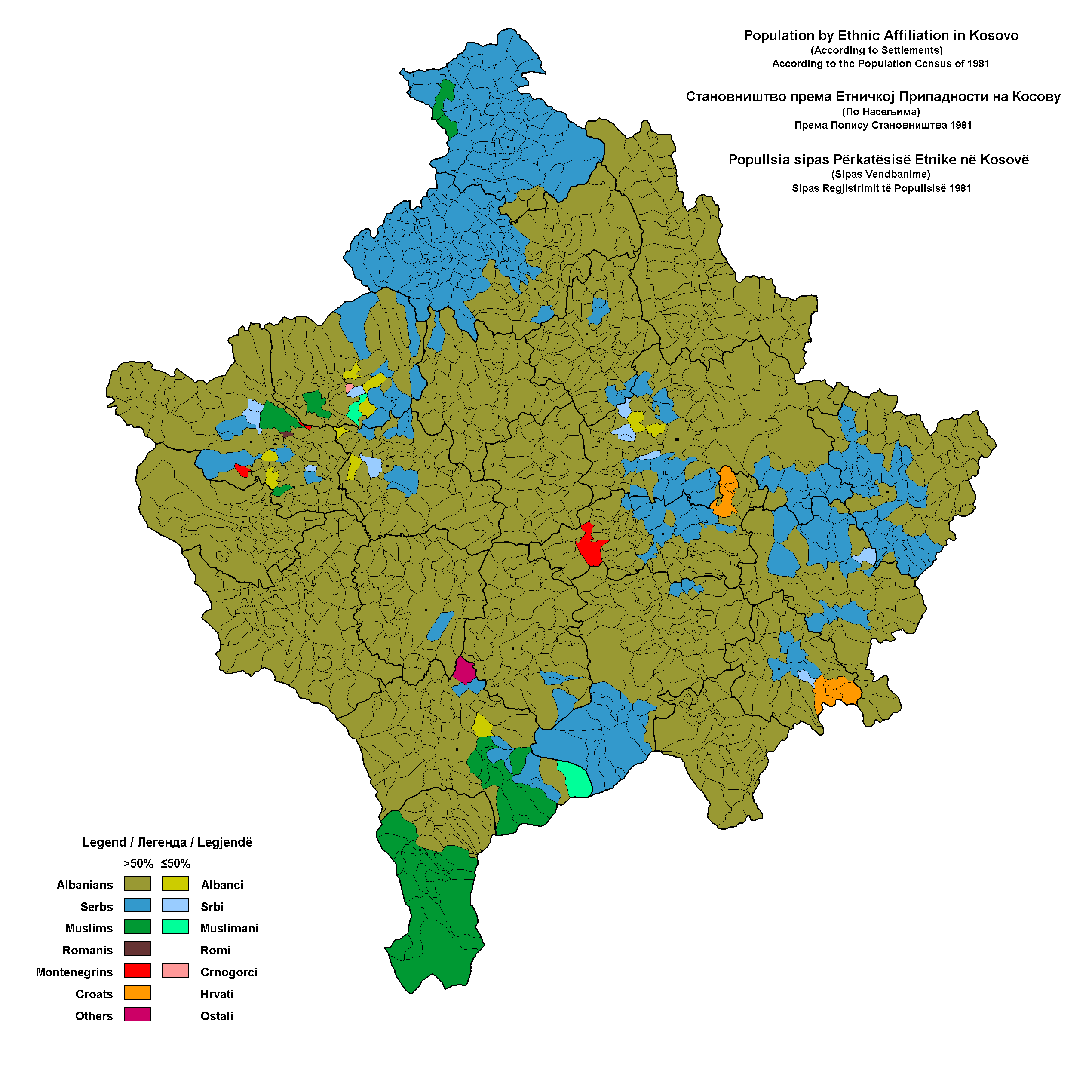
Ethnic structure of Kosovo and Metohija by settlements 1981.

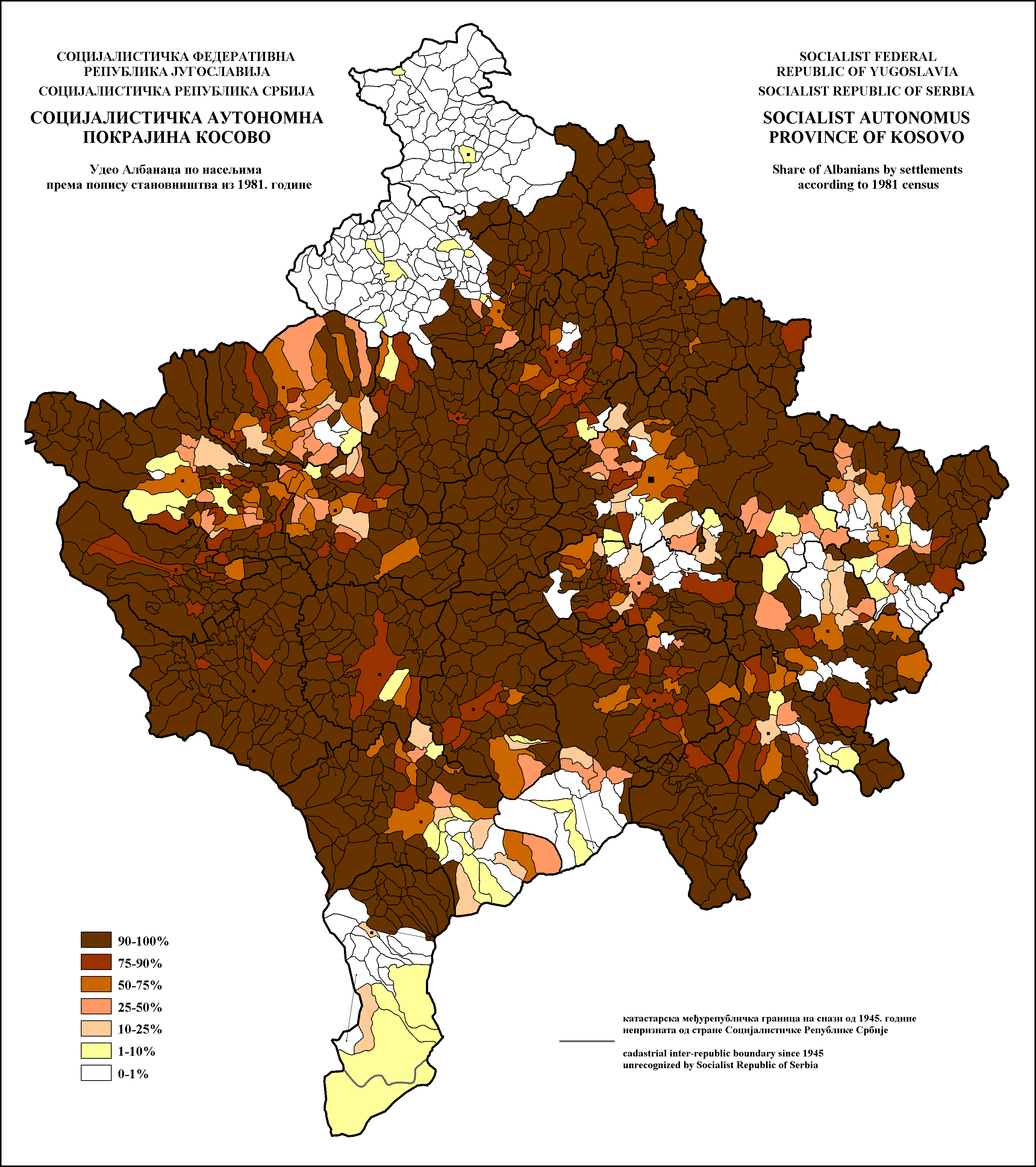
Distribution of Albanians on Kosovo and Metohija by settlements 1981.

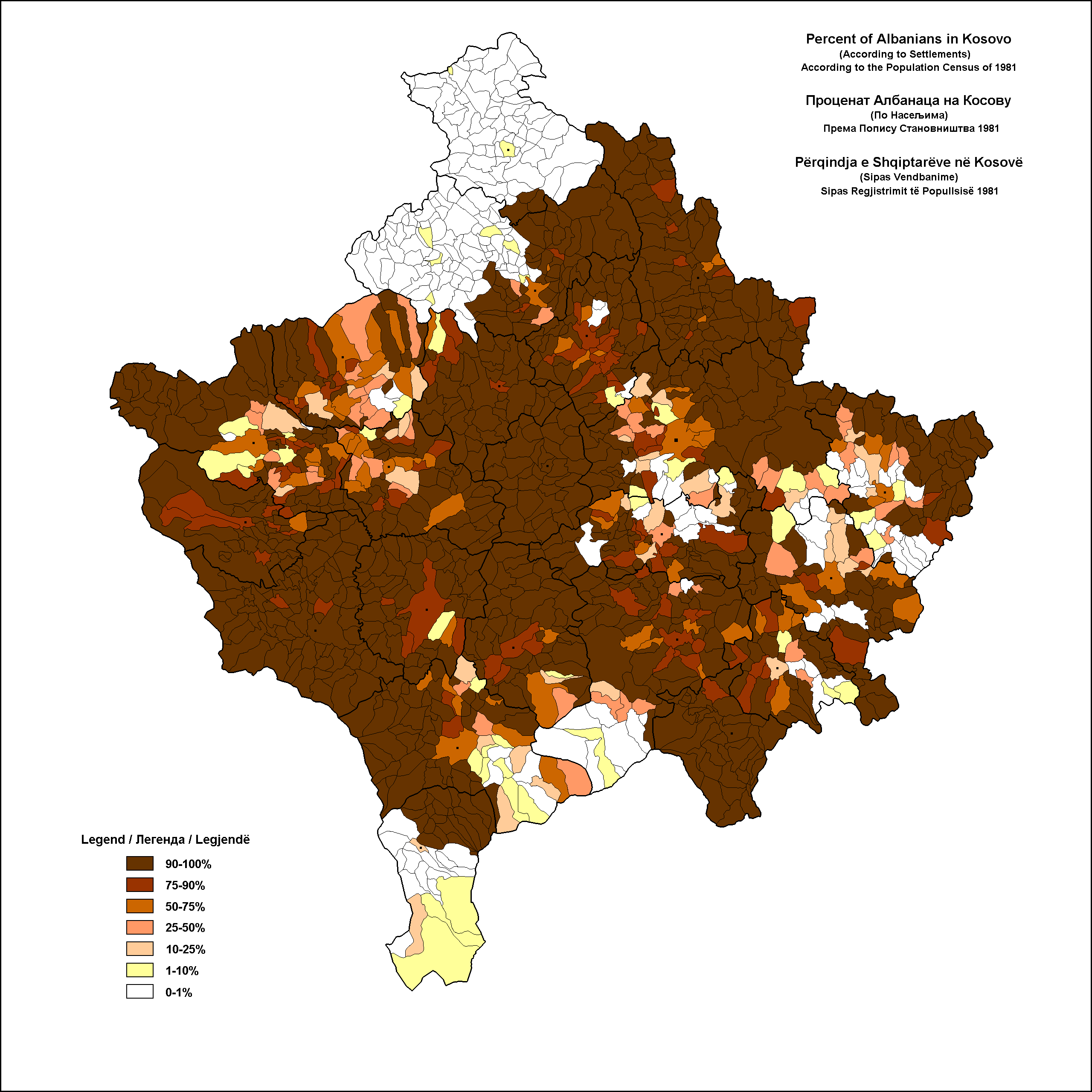
Distribution of Albanians on Kosovo and Metohija by settlements 1981.

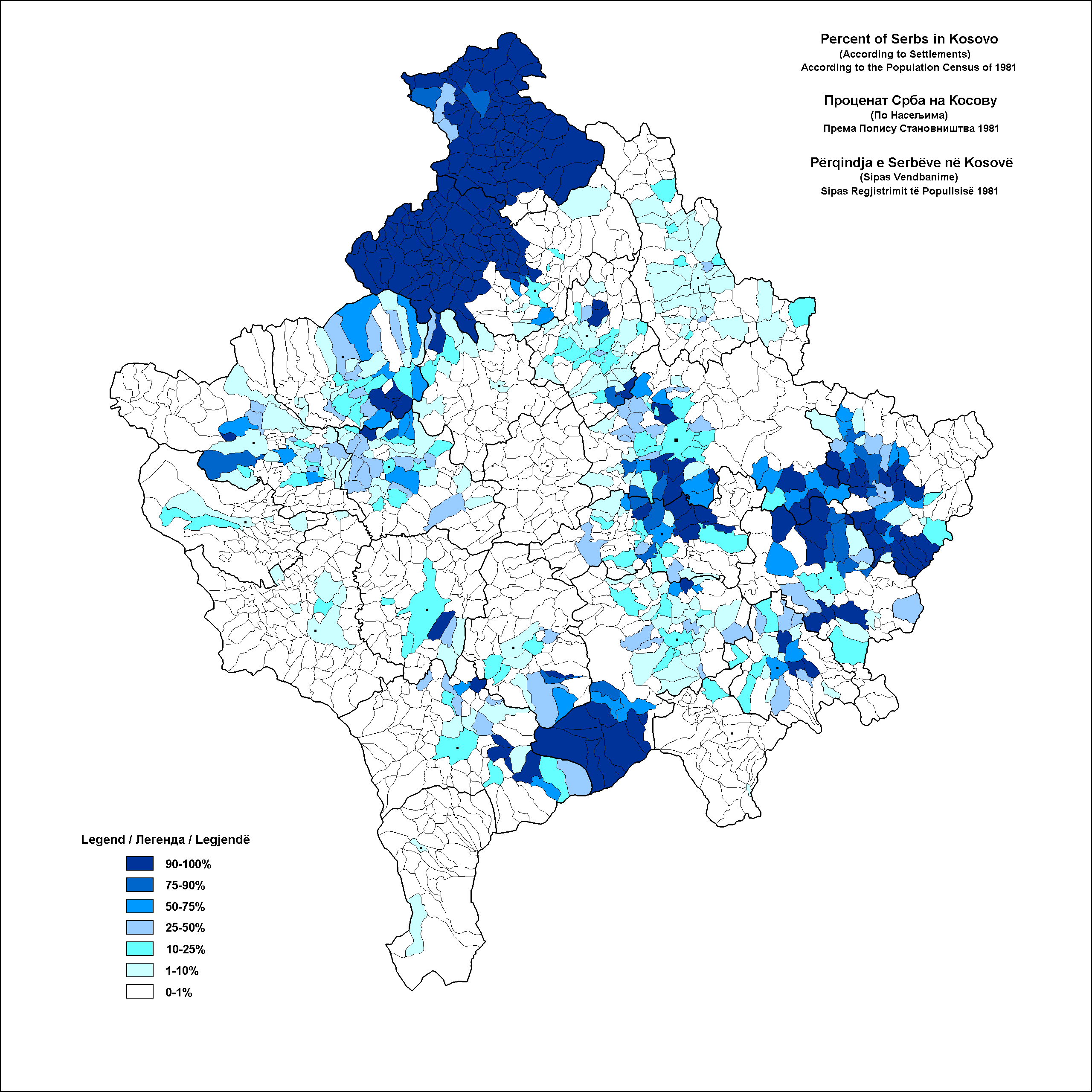
Distribution of Serbs on Kosovo and Metohija by settlements 1981.

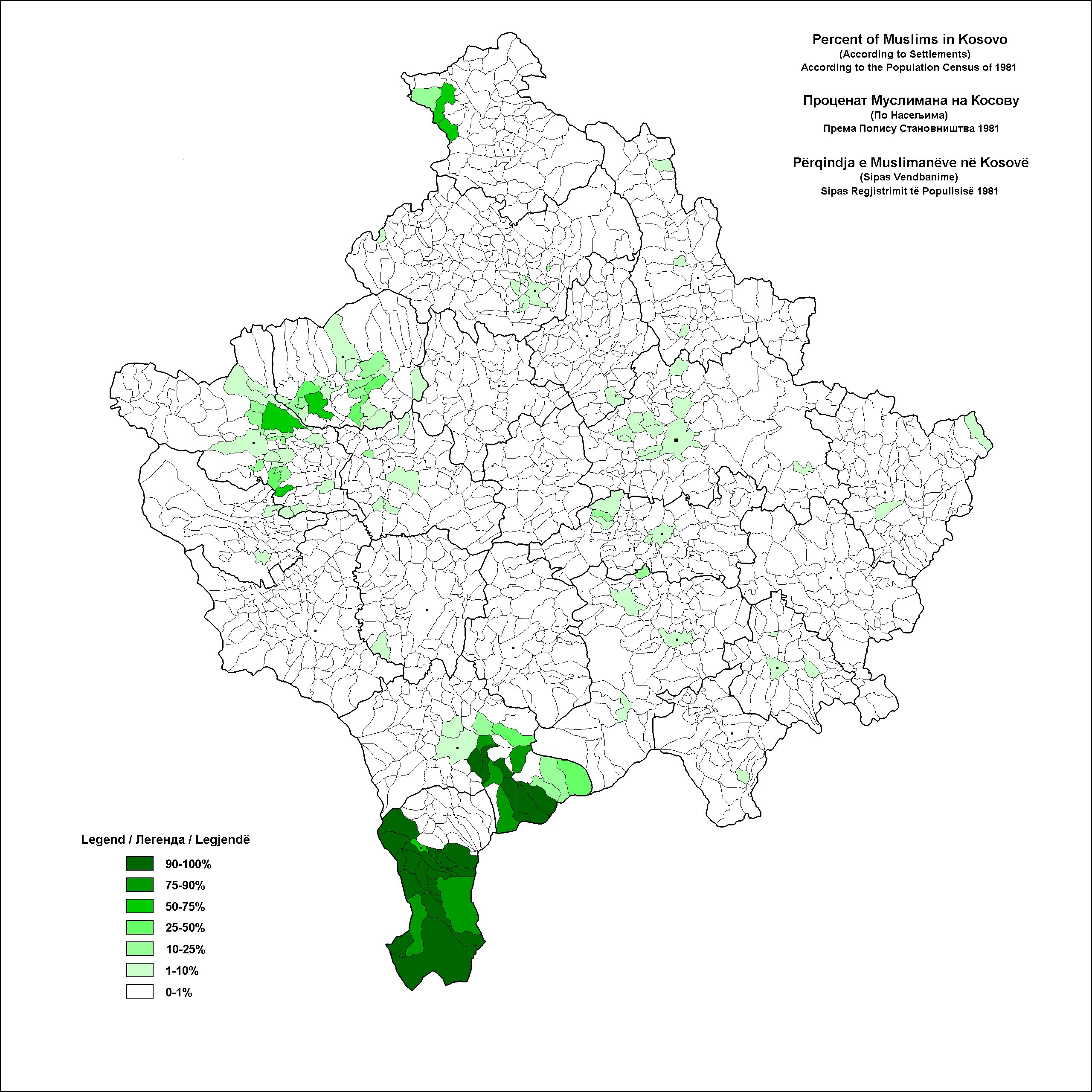
Distribution of Muslims on Kosovo and Metohija by settlements 1981.

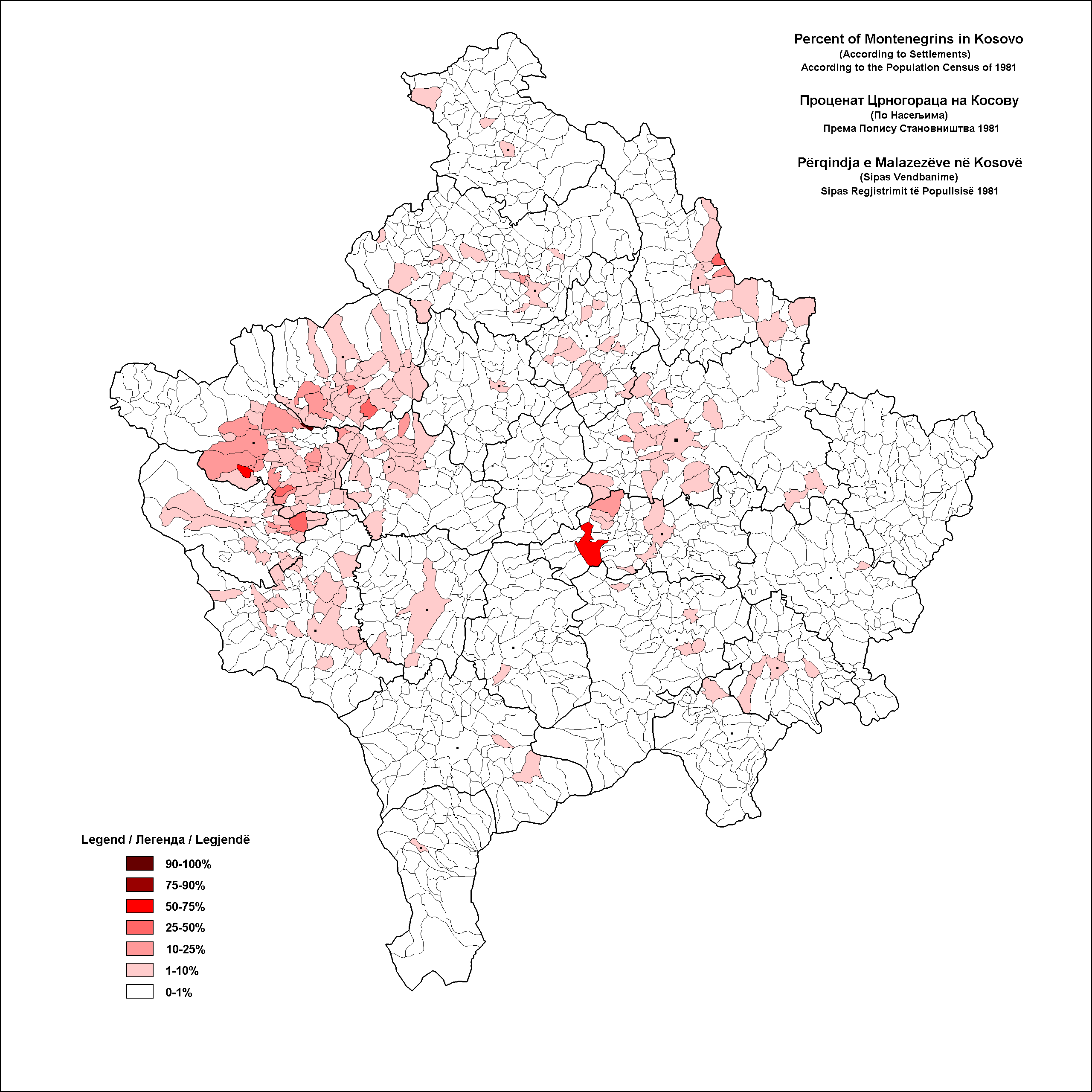
Distribution of Montenegrins on Kosovo and Metohija by settlements 1981.

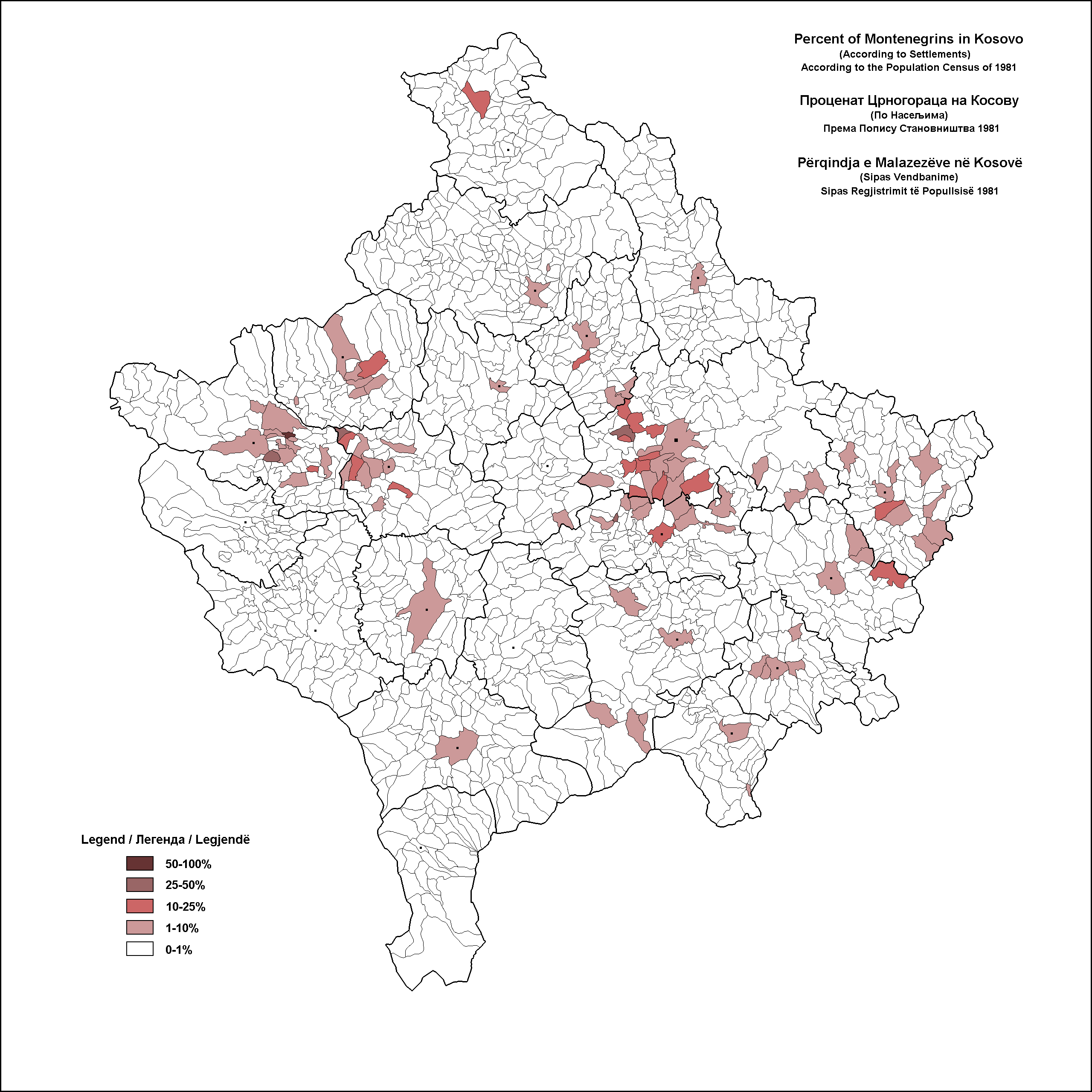
Distribution of Roma on Kosovo and Metohija by settlements 1981.

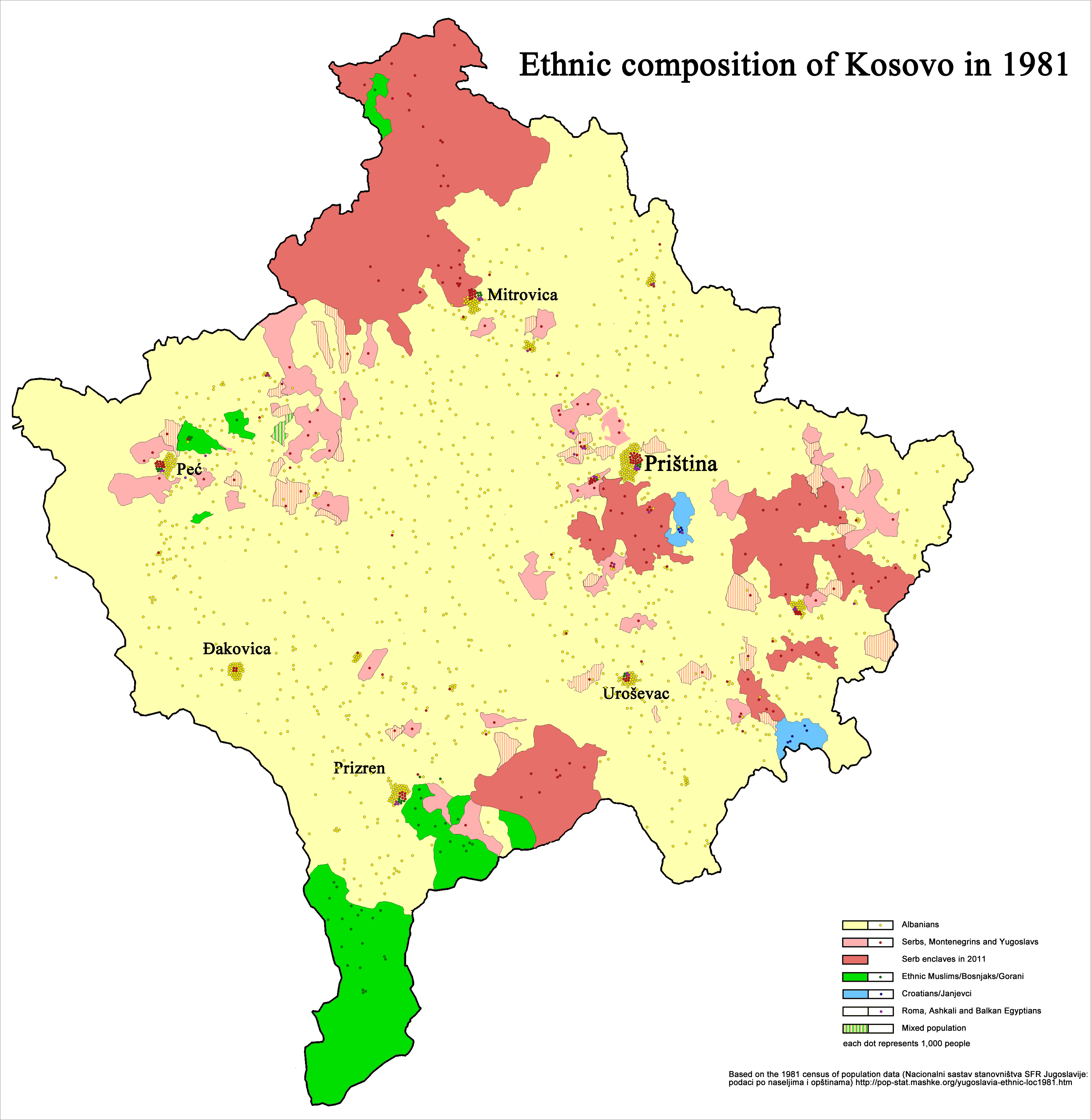
Ethnic composition of Kosovo in 1981 with Serb enclaves shown as in 2011

==== 1991 census ====
===== Registered population =====
Official Yugoslav statistical results, almost all Albanians and some Roma and ethnic Muslims boycotted the census following a call by Ibrahim Rugova to boycott Serbian institutions.

359,346 total inhabitants

By ethnicity:

- 194,190 Serbs
- 57,758 Muslims (minority boycotted)
- 44,307 Roma (minority boycotted)
- 20,356 Montenegrins
- 9,091 Albanians (majority boycotted)
- 10,446 Turks
- 8,062 Croats (Janjevci, Letnicani)
- 3,457 Yugoslavs
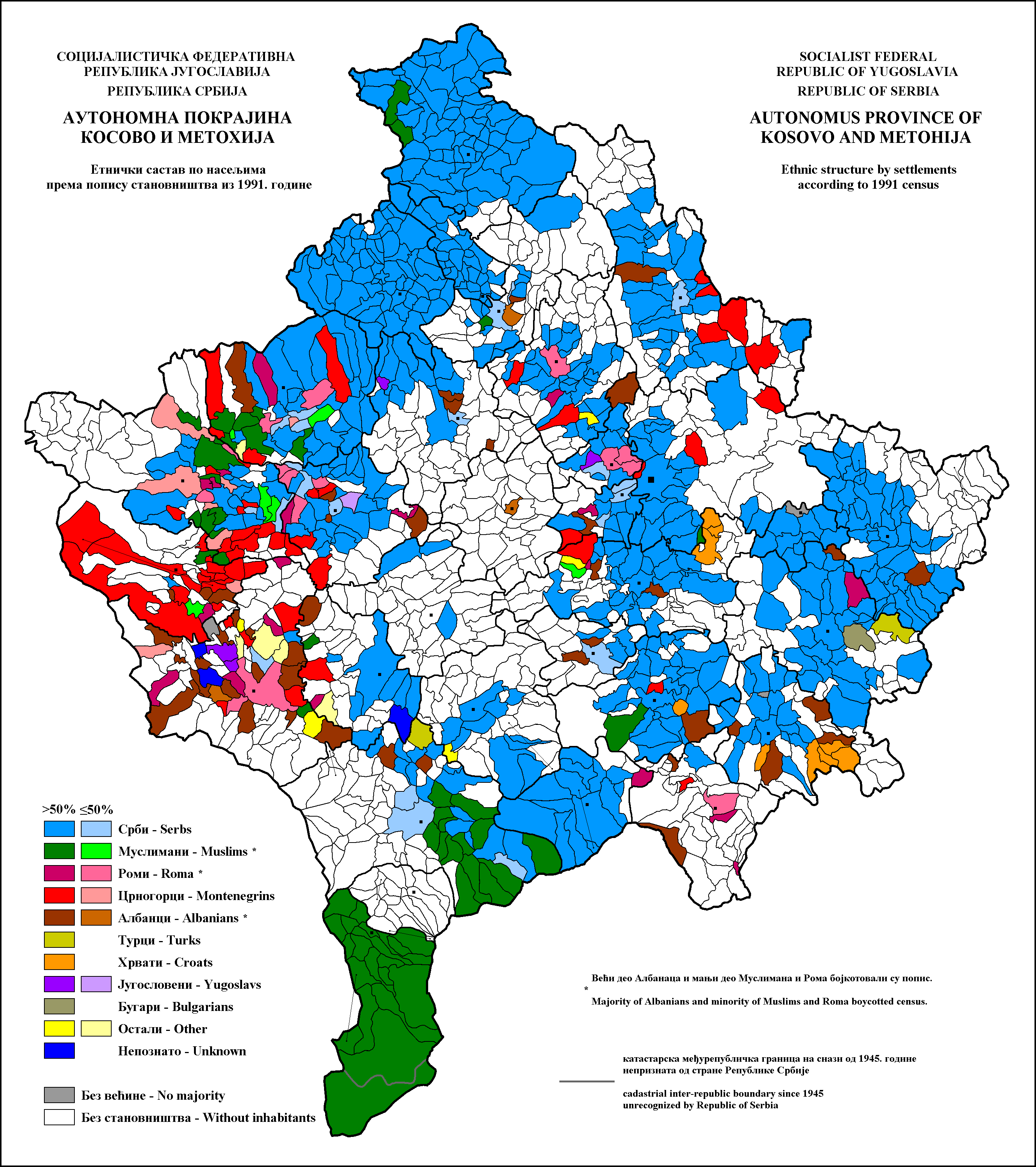
Ethnic structure of Kosovo and Metohija by settlements 1991 (registered population)

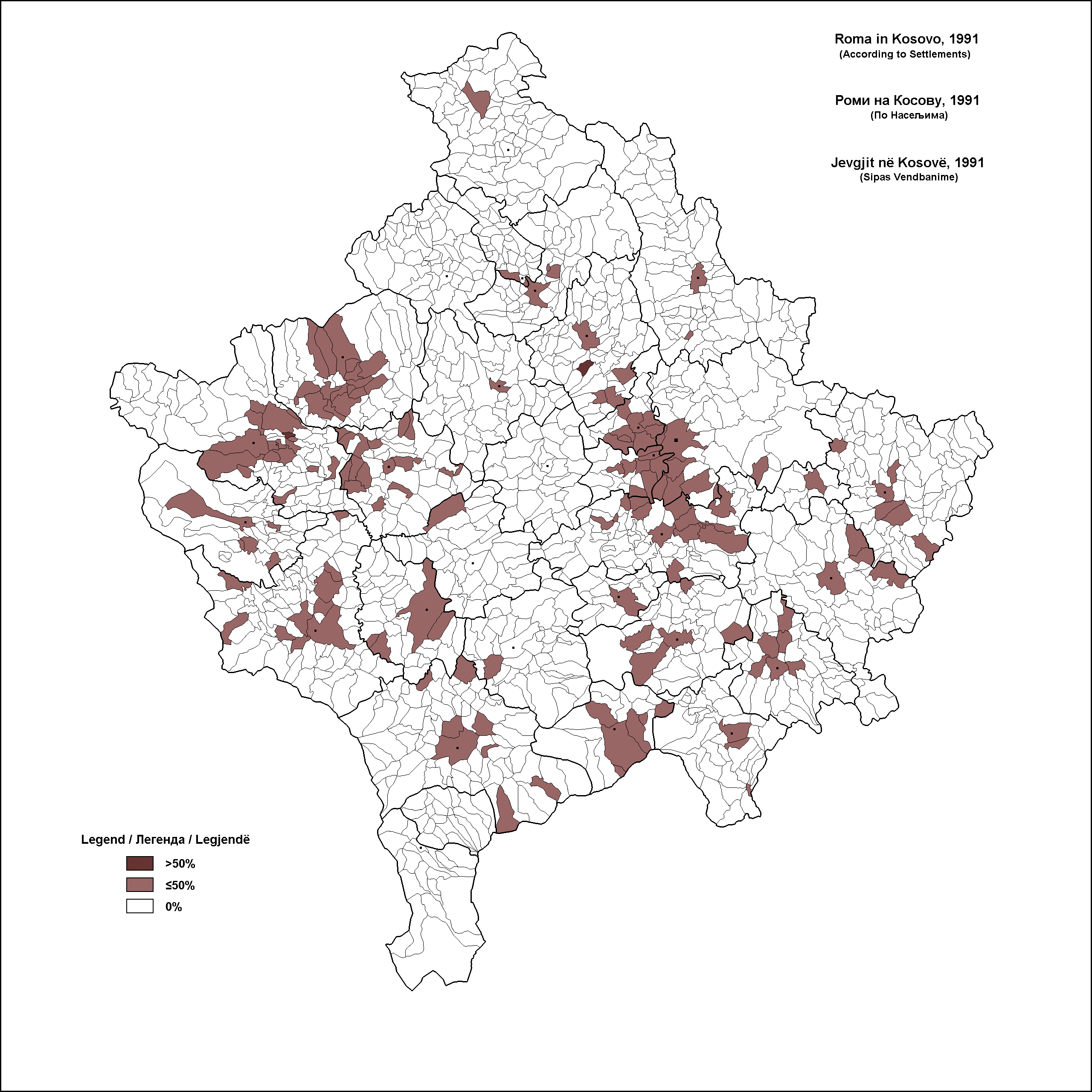
Distribution of Roma in Kosovo and Metohija by settlements 1991.

By religion:

- 216,742 (60,32%) Orthodox
- 126,577 (35,22%) Muslims
- 9,990 (2,78%) Catholics
- 1,036 (0,29) Atheist
- 4,417 (1,23) Unknown
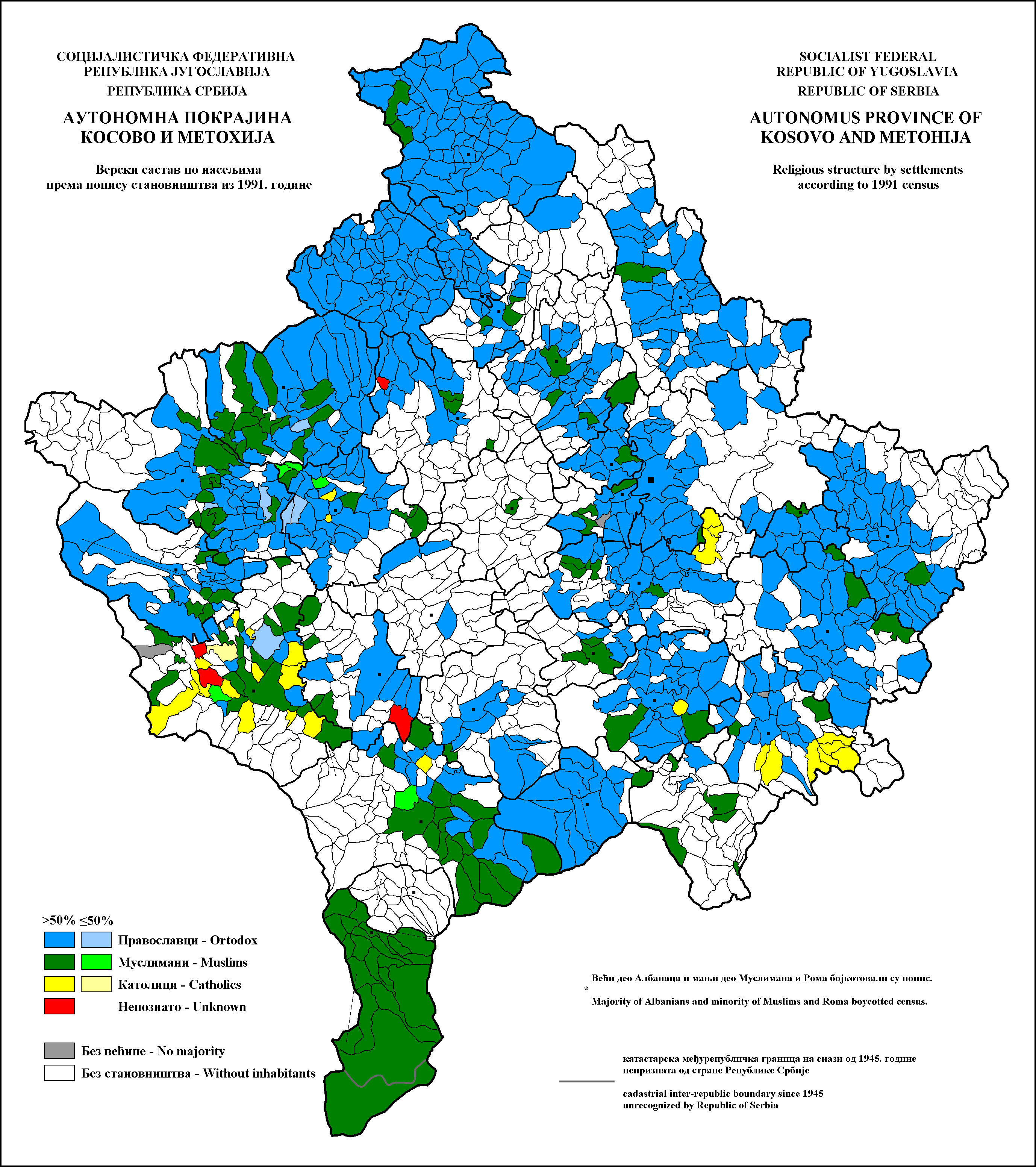
Religious structure of Kosovo and Metohija by settlements 1991. (registered population)

===== Estimated population =====
Statistical office of Autonomous Province of Kosovo and Metohija estimated total number of Albanians, Muslims and Roma.

1,956,196 total inhabitants

By ethnicity:

- 1,596,072 Albanians (81.6%)
- 194,190 Serbs (9.9%)
- 66,189 Muslims (3.4%)
- 45,745 Roma (2.34%)
- 20,365 Montenegrins (1.04%)
- 10,445 Turks (0.53%)
- 8,062 Croats (Janjevci, Letnicani) (0.41)
- 3,457 Yugoslavs (0.18%)
- 11,656 others (0.6%)
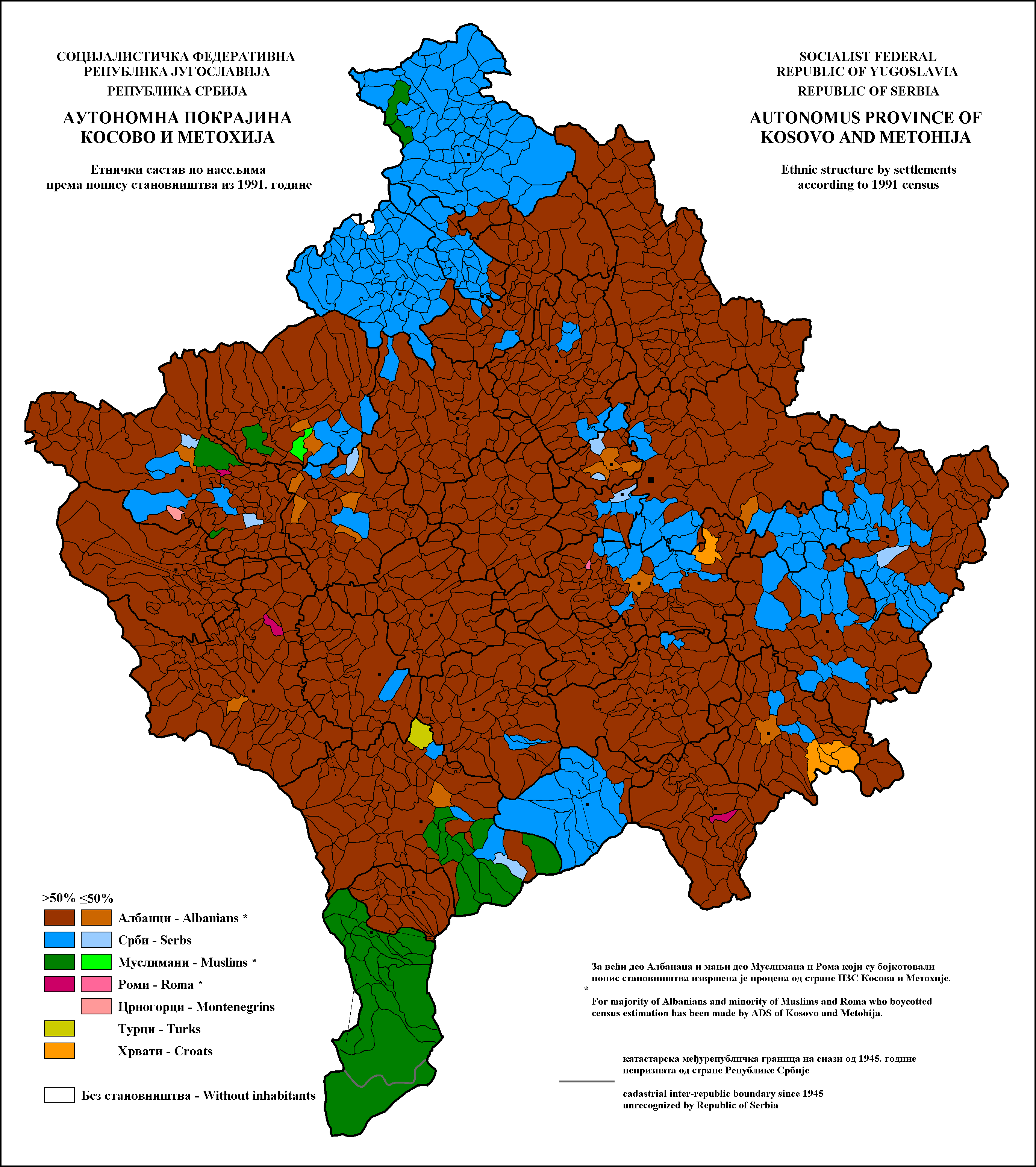
Ethnic structure of Kosovo and Metohija by settlements 1991

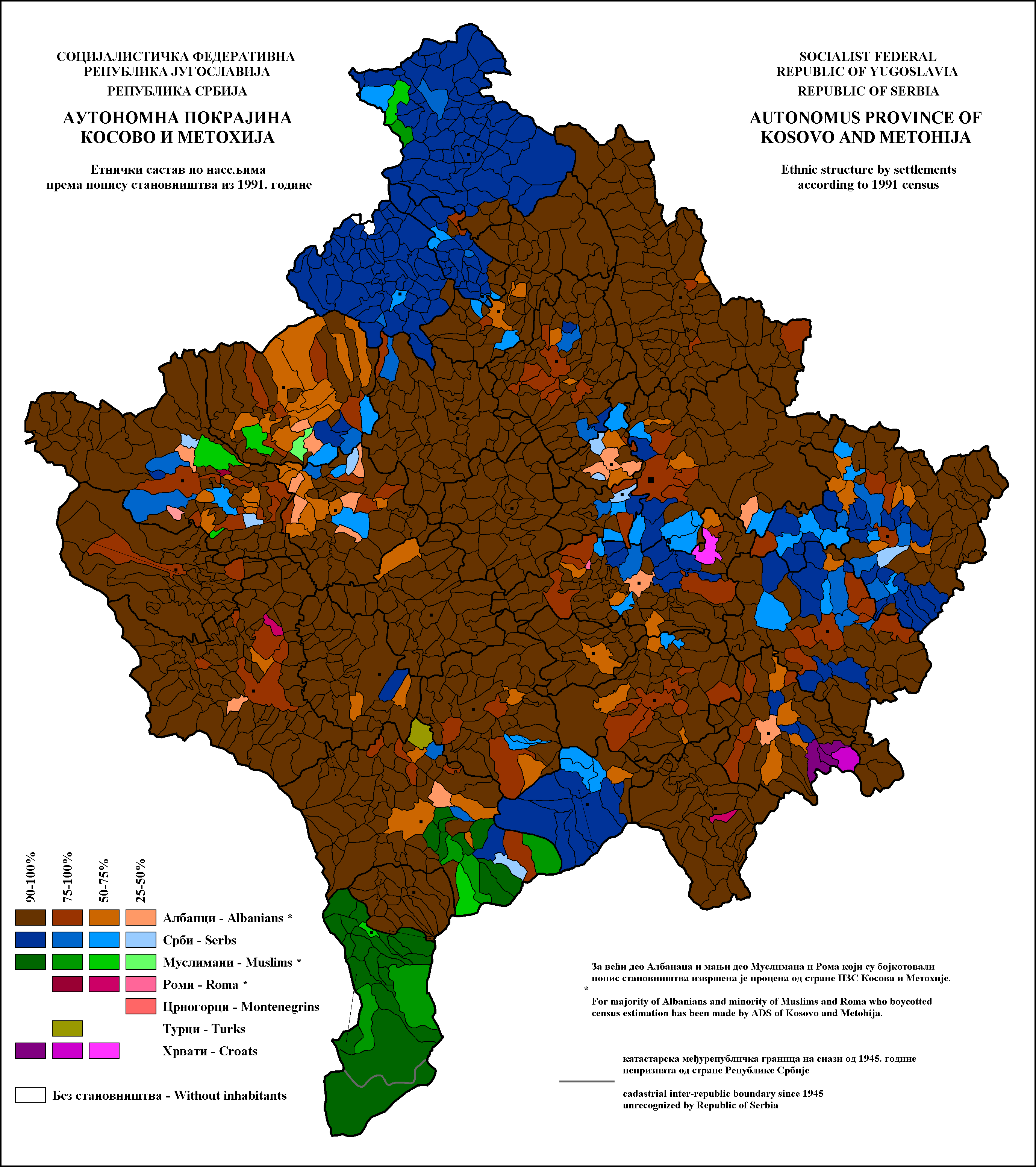
Ethnic structure of Kosovo and Metohija by settlements 1991

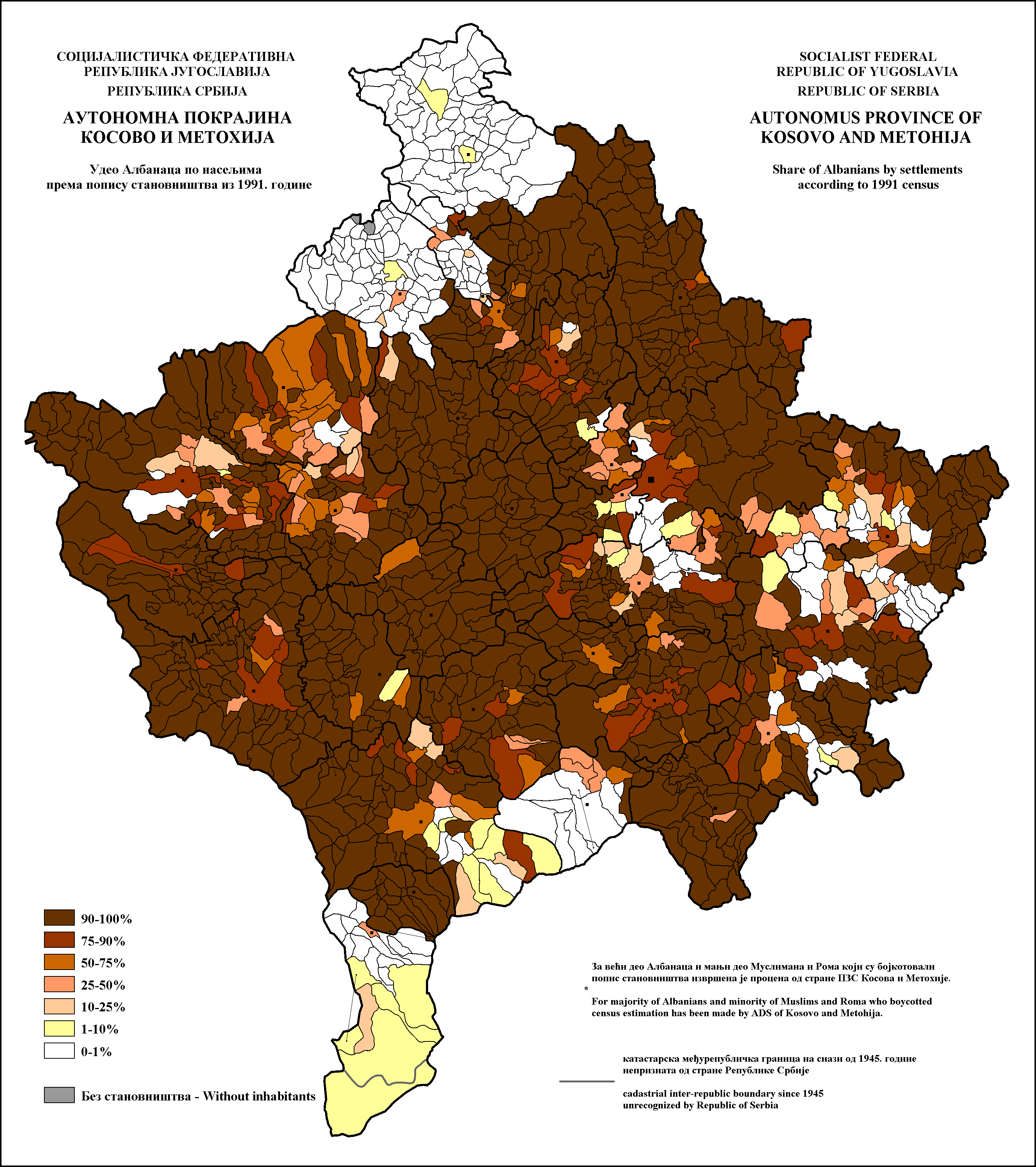
Share of Albanians on Kosovo and Metohija by settlements 1991

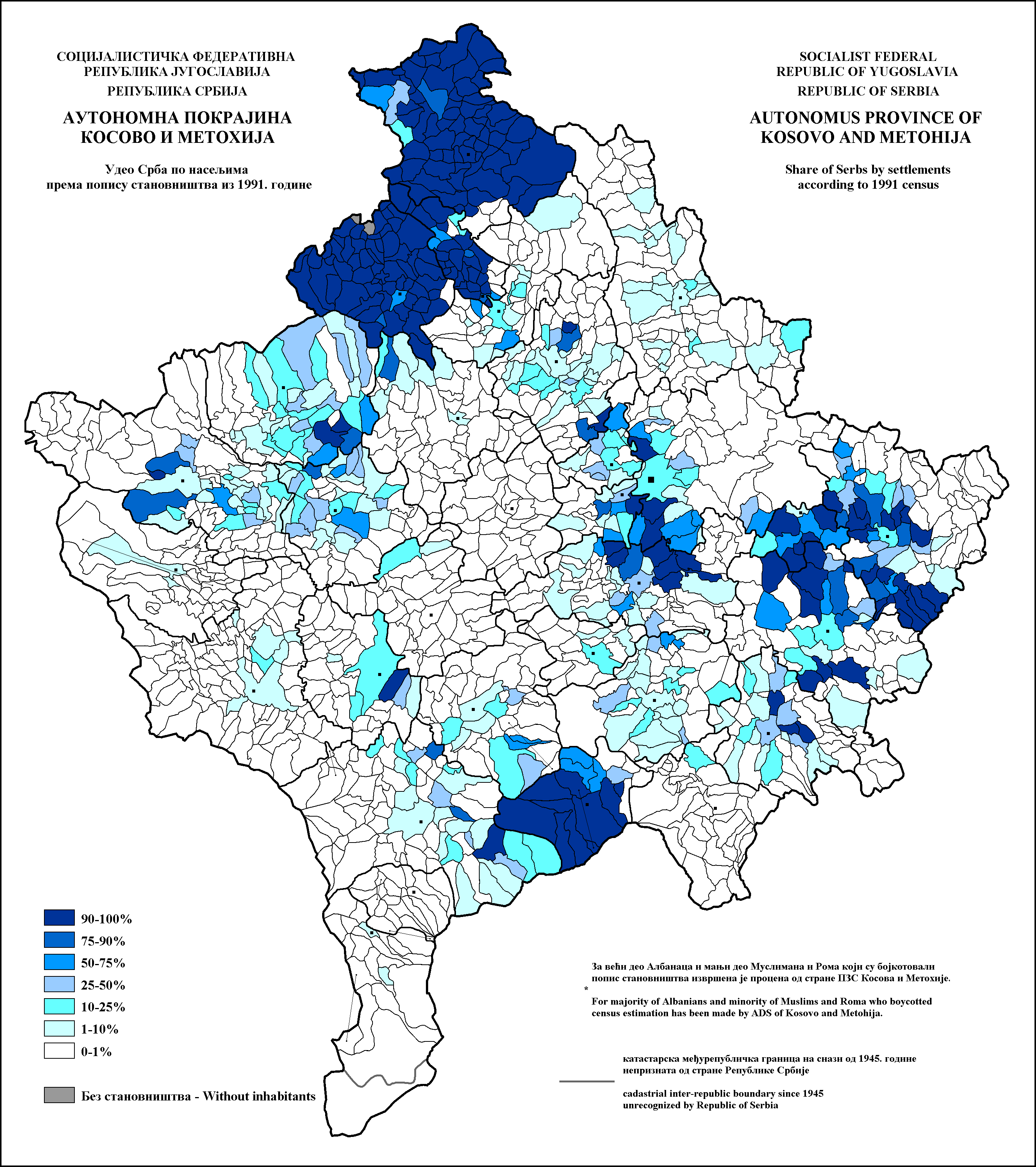
Share of Serbs on Kosovo and Metohija by settlements 1991

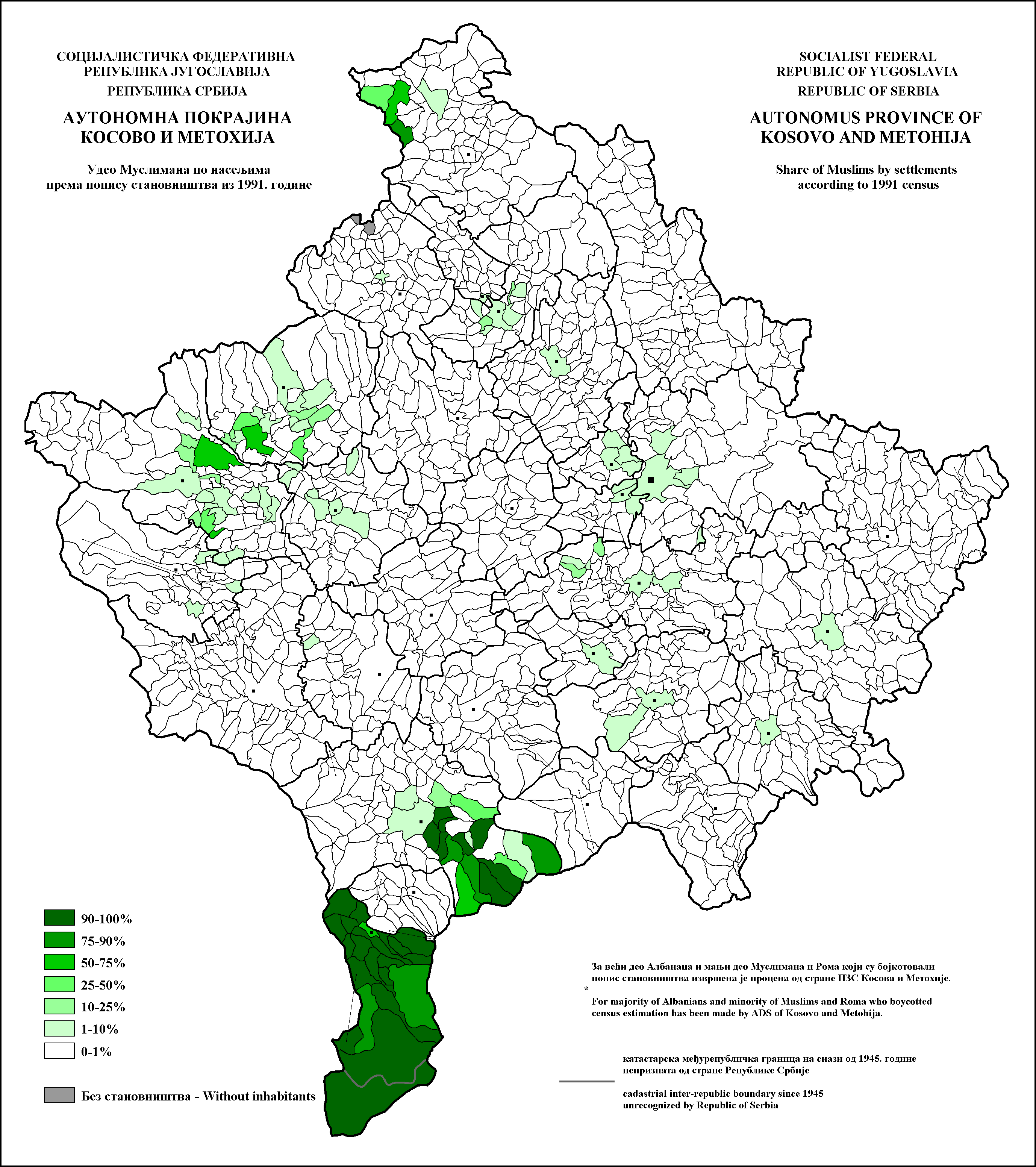
Share of Muslims on Kosovo and Metohija by settlements 1991

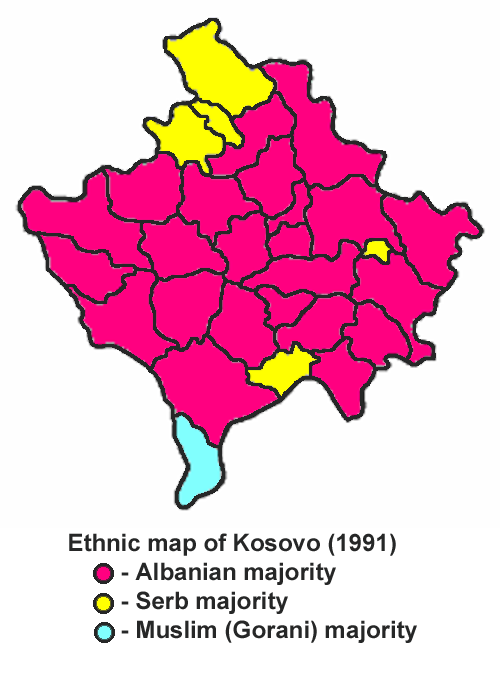
Ethnic map of Kosovo, 1991 data

The corrections should not be taken to be fully accurate. The number of Albanians is sometimes regarded as being an underestimate. On the other hand, it is sometimes regarded as an overestimate, being derived from earlier censa which are believed to be overestimates. The Statistical Office of Kosovo states that the quality of the 1991 census is "questionable." .

In September 1993, the Bosniak parliament returned their historical name Bosniaks. Some Kosovar Muslims have started using this term to refer to themselves since.

== Milošević government (1990s) ==
By 1992, the situation in Kosovo deteriorated and politicians from both sides were at an impasse toward solutions for the future of the region. Concerns increased among Serbs and an organisation was created called the Serb Block for Colonizing Kosovo in Pristina that aimed to get state officials based in Belgrade to raise the Serb population within Kosovo. As such, the state made available loans for building apartments and homes along with employment opportunities for Montenegrins and Serbs that chose to relocate to the region. In March 1992, nearly 3,000 people from the Serb minority in Albania had emigrated to Kosovo after accepting the government offer. At the time, the government under President Slobodan Milošević pursued colonisation amidst a situation of financial difficulties and limited resources. Laws were passed by the parliament of Serbia that sought to change the power balance in Kosovo relating to the economy, demography and politics. The parliament of Serbia on 11 January 1995 passed the Decree for Colonisation of Kosovo of the Federal Republic of Yugoslavia. It outlined government benefits for Serbs who desired to go and live in Kosovo with loans to build homes or purchase other dwellings and offered free plots of land. Few Serbs took up the offer due to the worsening situation in Kosovo at the time.

Around 10,000 Serb refugees from Krajina and over 2000 from Bosnia were resettled in Kosovo, due to the Yugoslav Wars. In 1995, the government attempted to alter the ethnic balance of the region through the planned resettlement of 100,000, later reduced to 20,000 Serbian refugees from Krajina in Croatia to Kosovo. Some of the Serb refugees opposed going to Kosovo. In 1996, official government statistics placed the number of refugees in Kosovo at 19,000. Most of the Serb refugees left thereafter and a few remained. In early 1997, the number of resettled Serb refugees in Kosovo was 4,000 and 6,000 in early 1999. As the sociopolitical situation deteriorated, Kosovo Albanians numbering some 300,000 fled during this period for Western Europe. After the outbreak of conflict between the Milošević government and the Kosovo Liberation Army, in early 1997, an estimated 9,000 Serb refugees and 20,000 local Serbs left Kosovo.

=== Kosovo War (1999) ===
During the Kosovo war (March–June 1999), Serb forces, apparently, expelled between 800,000 – 1,000,000 Albanians from Kosovo employing tactics such as confiscating personal documents to make it difficult or prevent any future return. Kosovo Albanians later returned following NATO intervention and the end of the war.

In 1999 more than 11,000 deaths were reported to the office of the International Criminal Tribunal for the former Yugoslavia prosecutor Carla Del Ponte. Around 10,317 civilians in total were killed during the war, of whom 8,676 were Albanians, 1,196 Serbs and 445 Roma and others in addition to 3,218 killed members of armed formations. As of 2010, some 3,000 people were still missing, of which 2,500 are Albanian, 400 Serbs and 100 Roma.

In the days after the Yugoslav Army withdrew, over 80,000 (almost half of 200,000 estimated to live in Kosovo) Serb and other non-Albanians civilians were expelled from Kosovo. Estimates of the number of Serbs who left when Serbian forces departed from Kosovo vary from 65,000 to 250,000. In addition, less than one hundred of the Serb refugees from Croatia remained in Kosovo.

== Contemporary ==
=== 2011 census ===
In the 2011 census there were 1,739,825 inhabitants. ECMI "calls for caution when referring to the 2011 census", due to the boycott by Serb-majority municipalities in North Kosovo and the partial boycott by Serb and Roma in southern Kosovo. According to the data, this is the ethnic composition of Kosovo:

- Albanians: 1,616,869 (92.9%)
- Serbs*: 25,532 (1.5%)
- Bosniaks: 27,553 (1.6%)
- Turks: 18,738 (1.1%)
- Ashkali: 15,436 (0.9%)
- Egyptians: 11,524 (0.6%)
- Gorani: 10,265 (0.6%)
- Romani: 8,824 (0.5%)
- Other: 2352 (0.1%)
- Unspecified: 2752 (0.1%)

As of 2014, there are around 96,000 Kosovo Serbs and about 3/4 of them live in North Kosovo.

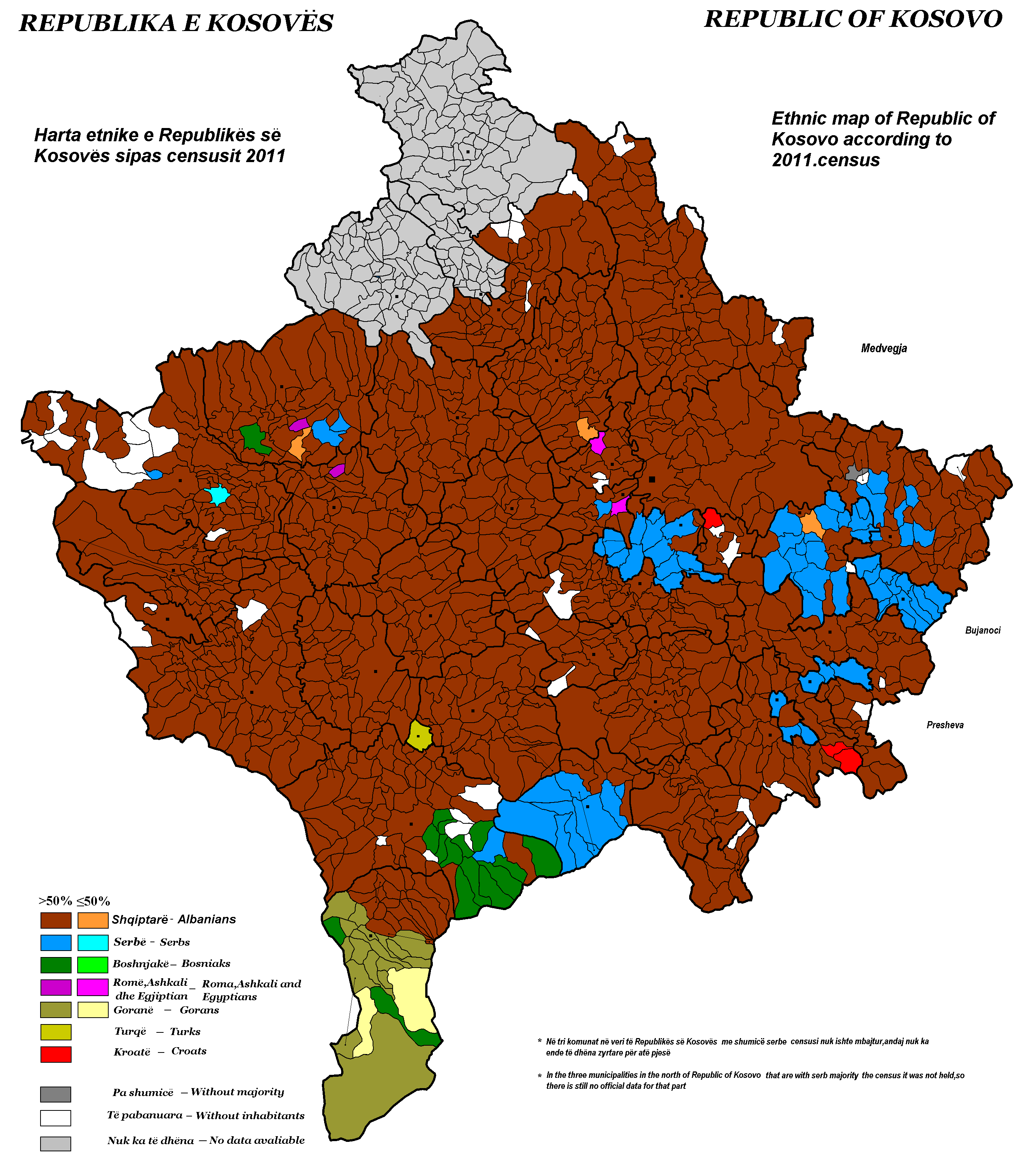
Kosovo ethnic map 2011 by settlement.

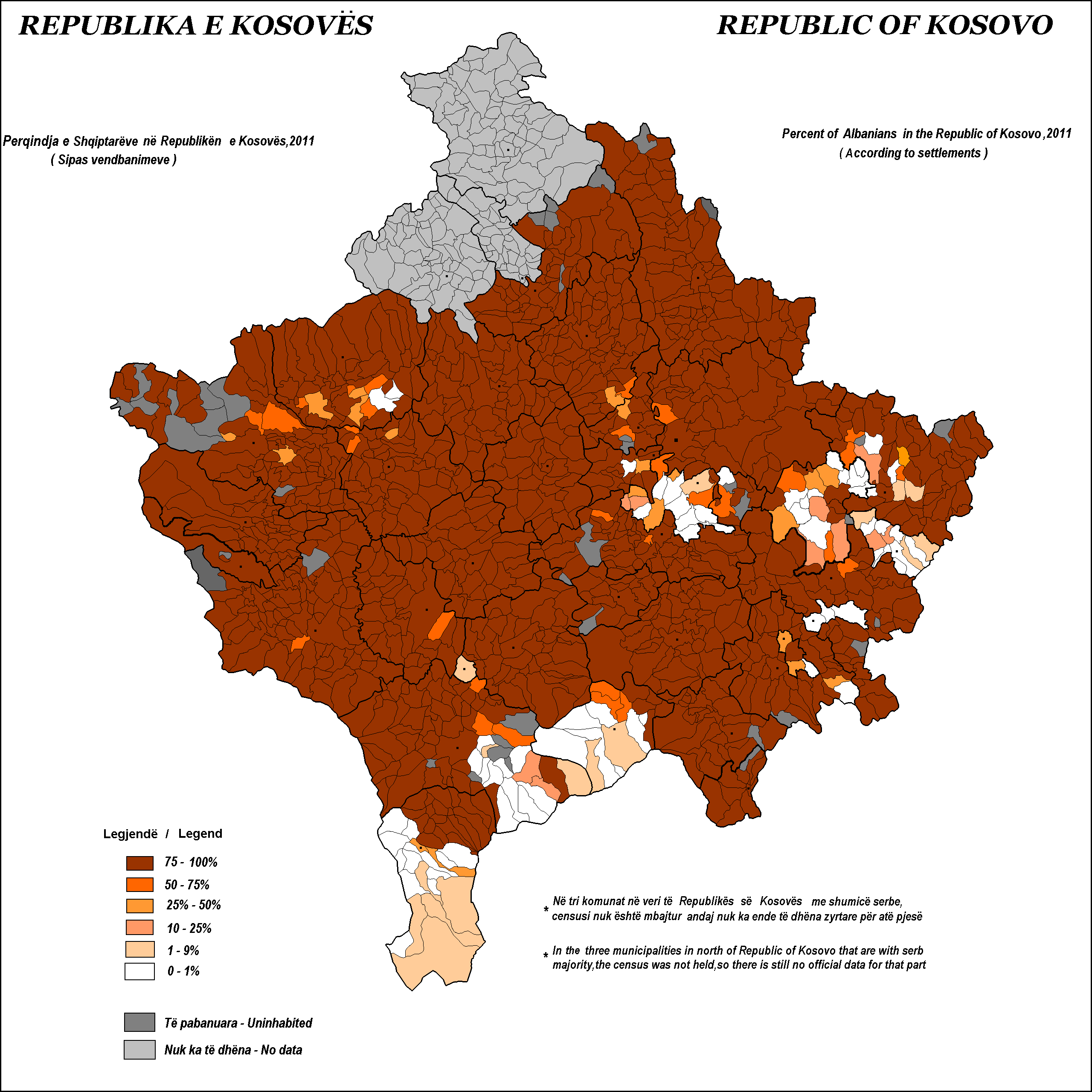
Distribution of Albanians in Kosovo 2011 by settlements.

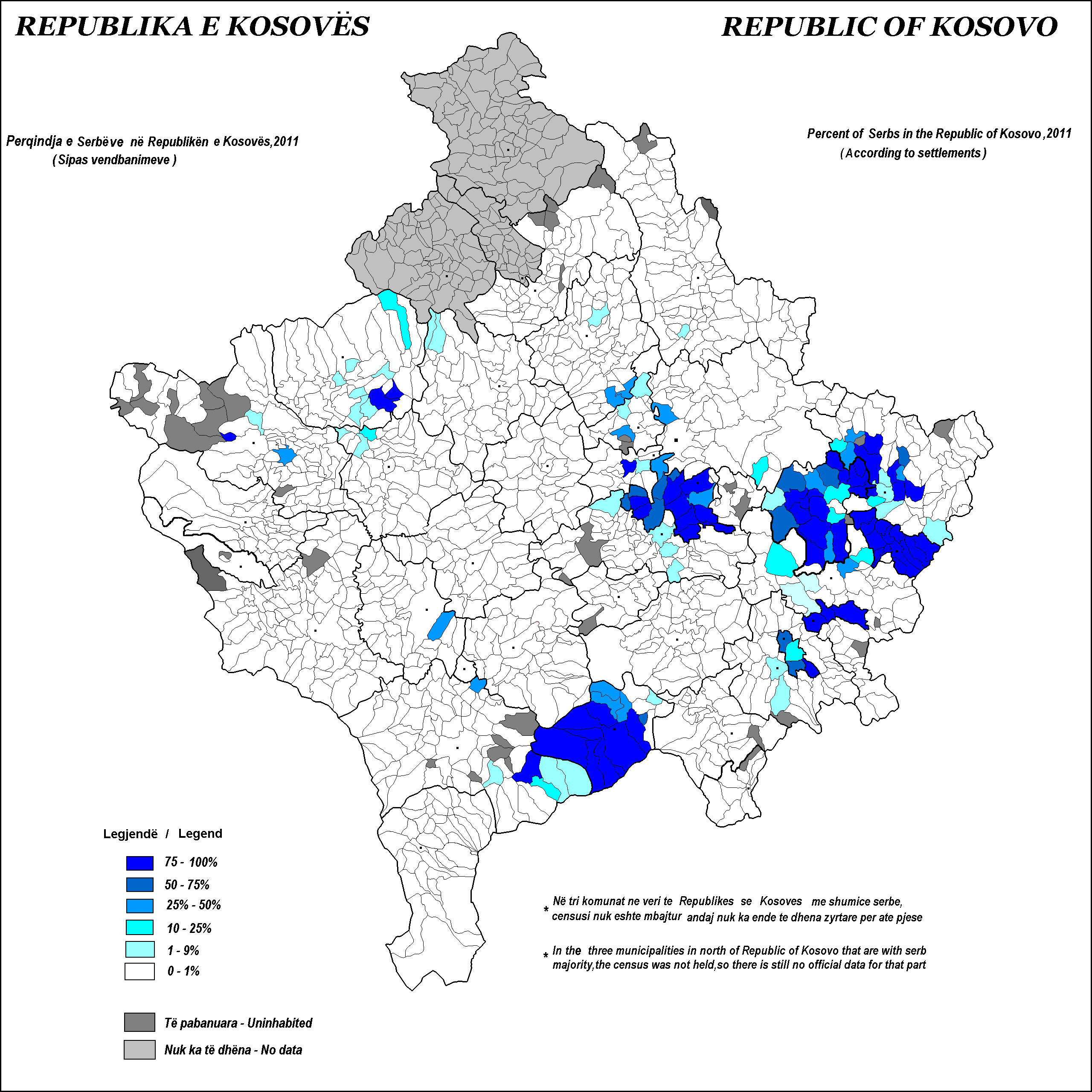
Distribution of Serbs in Kosovo 2011 by settlements.

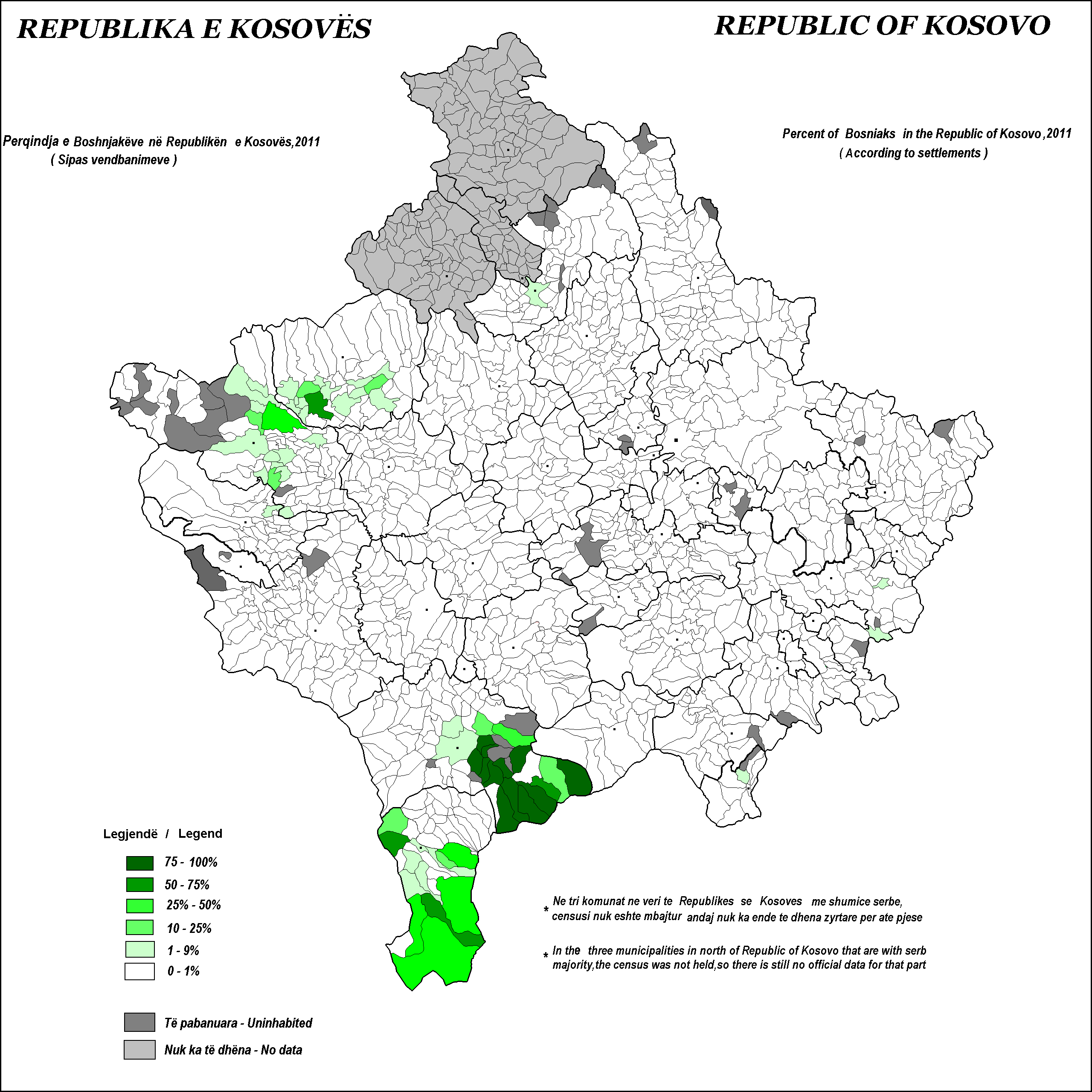
Distribution of Bosniaks in Kosovo 2011 by settlements.

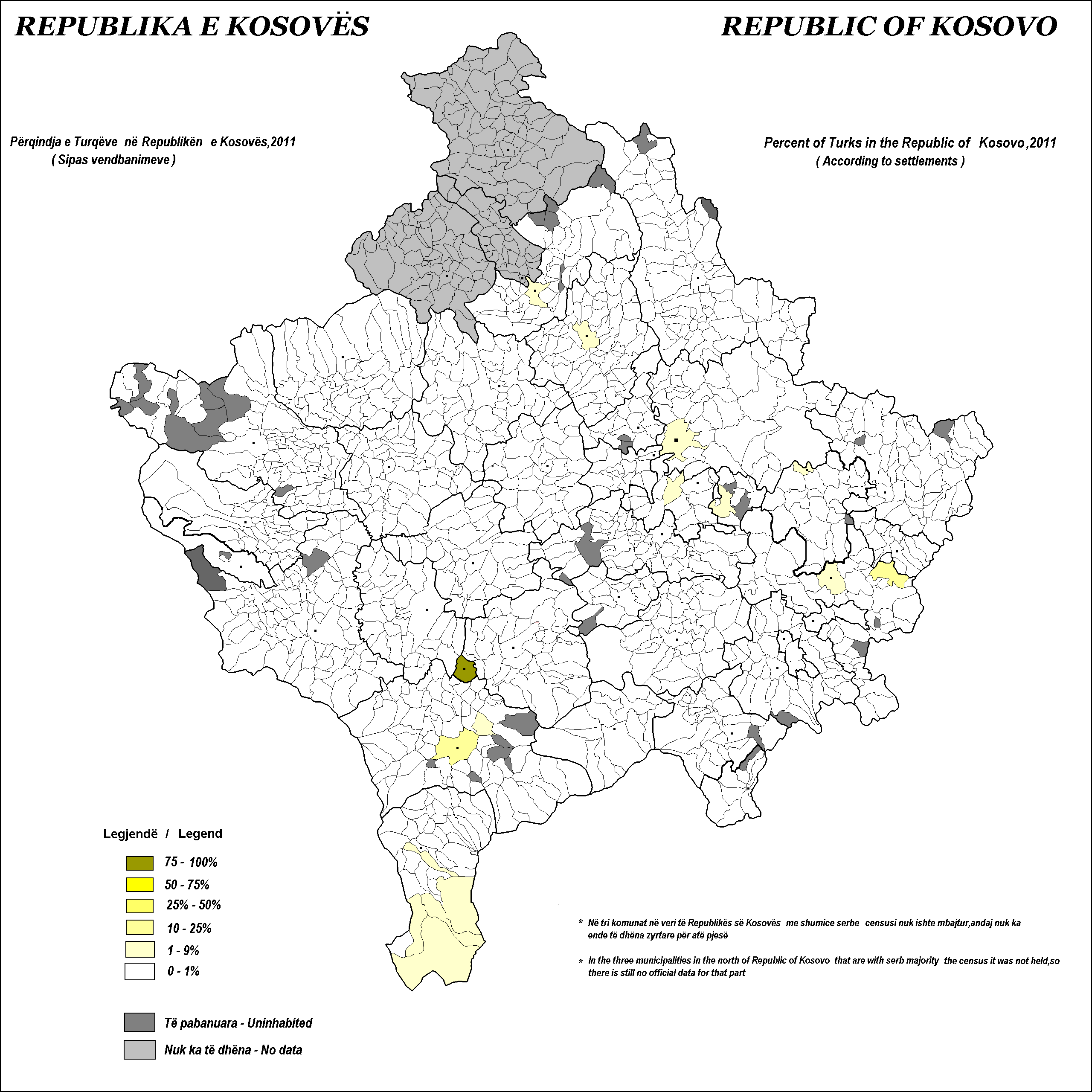
Distribution of Turks in Kosovo 2011 by settlements.

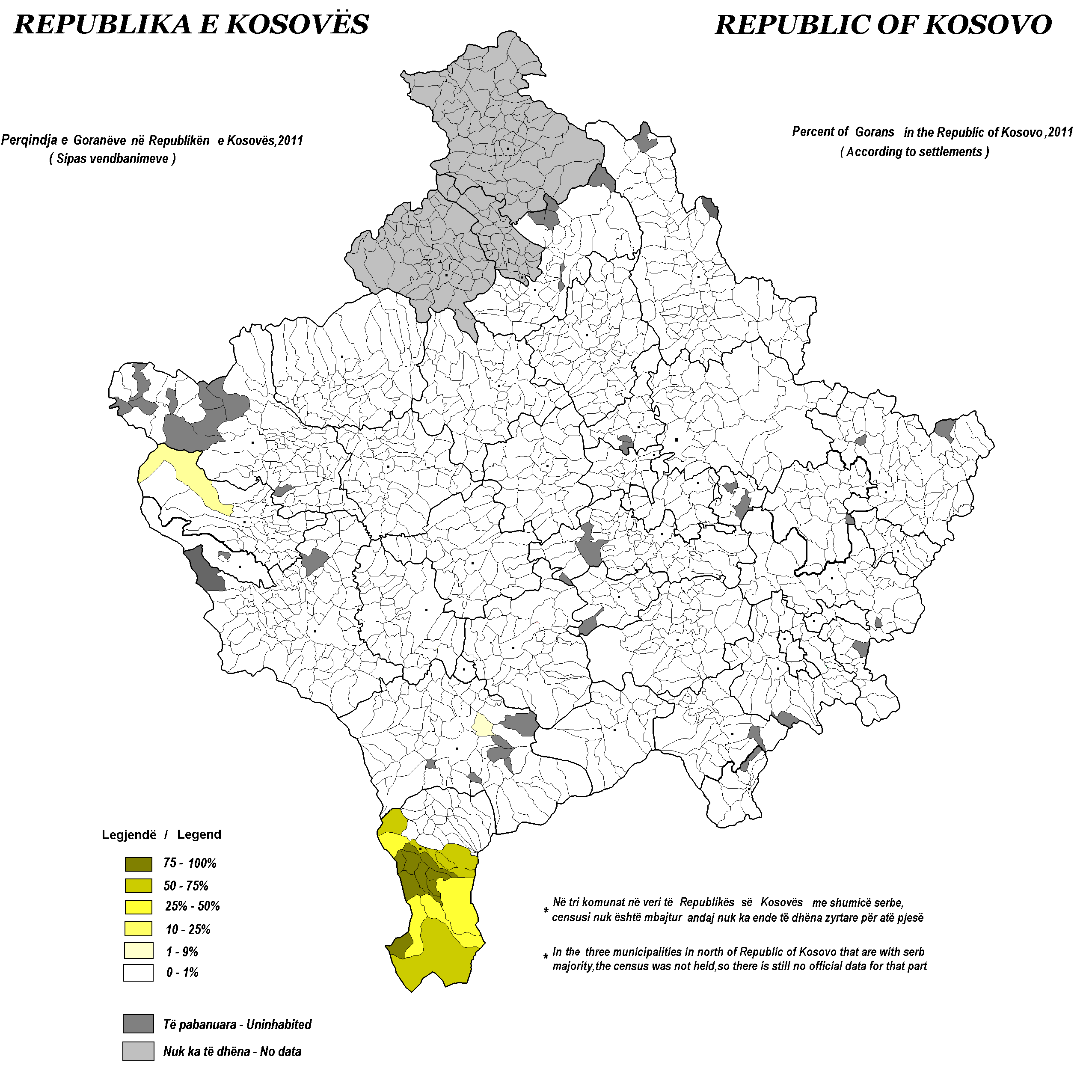
Distribution of Gorani's in Kosovo 2011 by settlements.

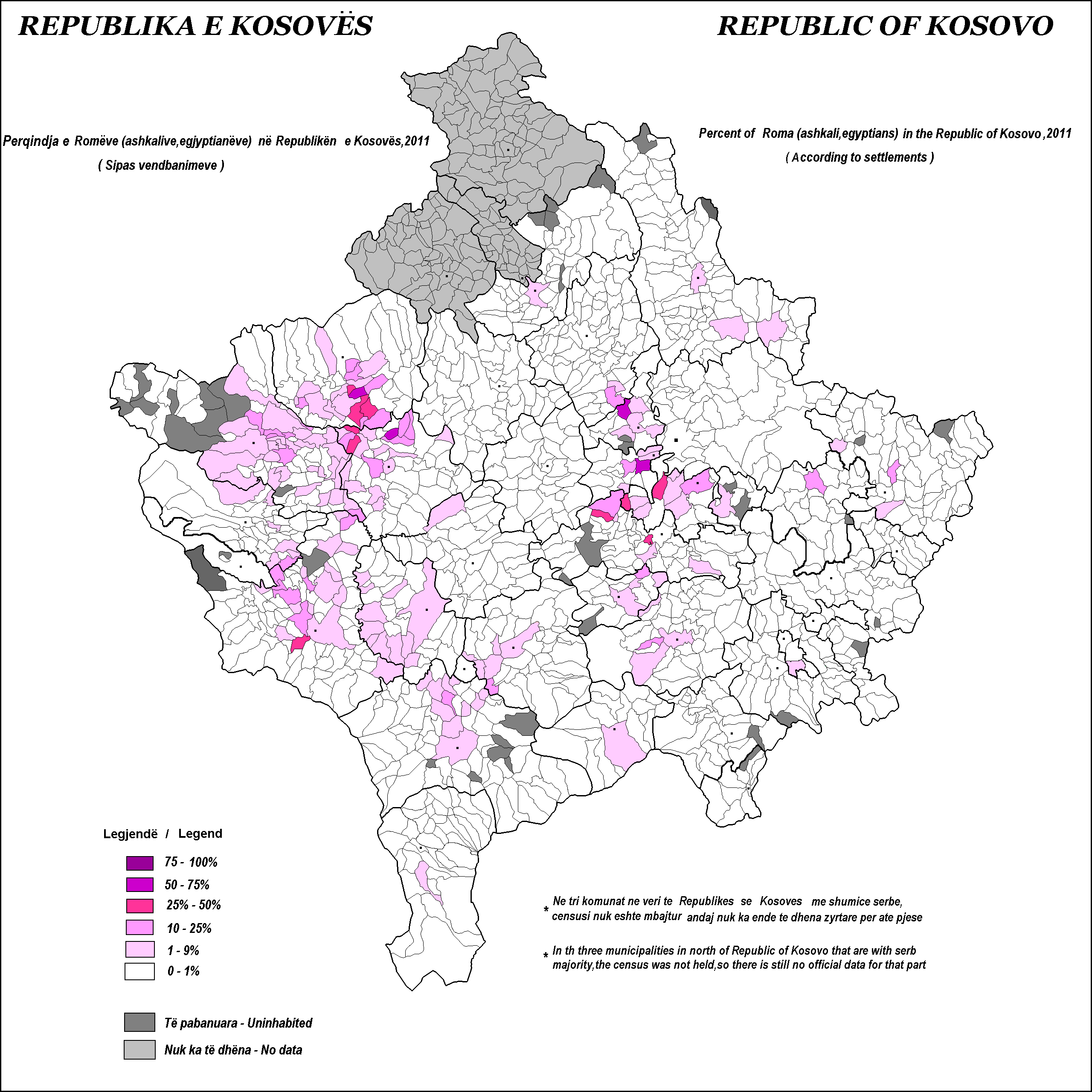
Distribution of Roma, Ashkali and Egyptians in Kosovo 2011 by settlements.

== See also ==
- Demographics of Kosovo
- Demographic history of Serbia

== Sources ==
- Banac, Ivo (1984). The National Question in Yugoslavia: Origins, History, Politics. Cornell Paperbacks: Slavic studies, history, political science. Cornell University Press. ISBN 978-0-8014-9493-2.
- Cocozelli, Fred (2016). Ramet, Sabrina (ed.). Ethnic Minorities and Politics in Post-Socialist Southeastern Europe. Cambridge University Press. ISBN 978-1316982778.
- Curta, Florin (2001). The Making of the Slavs: History and Archaeology of the Lower Danube Region, c. 500–700. Cambridge: Cambridge University Press. ISBN 9781139428880.
- Curta, Florin (2006). Southeastern Europe in the Middle Ages, 500–1250. Cambridge: Cambridge University Press. ISBN 9780521815390.
- Gawrych, George (2006). The Crescent and the Eagle: Ottoman rule, Islam and the Albanians, 1874–1913. London: IB Tauris. ISBN 978-1-8451-1287-5.
- Hammond, Nicholas Geoffrey Lemprière (1966). "The Kingdoms in Illyria circa 400-167 B.C.". The Annual of the British School at Athens. 61. British School at Athens: 239–253. doi:10.1017/S0068245400019043. JSTOR 30103175. S2CID 164155370.
- Malcolm, Noel (1998). Kosovo: A Short History. Macmillan. ISBN 9780333666128.
- Malcolm, Noel (2020). Rebels, Believers, Survivors: Studies in the History of the Albanians. Oxford University Press. ISBN 9780192599223.
- Papazoglu, Fanula (1978). The Central Balkan Tribes in pre-Roman Times: Triballi, Autariatae, Dardanians, Scordisci and Moesians. Amsterdam: Hakkert. ISBN 9789025607937.
- Prendergast, Eric (2017). The Origin and Spread of Locative Determiner Omission in the Balkan Linguistic Area (Thesis). UC Berkeley.
- Vickers, Miranda (1998). Between Serb and Albanian: A History of Kosovo. Columbia University Press. ISBN 0-631-19807-5.
- Wilkes, J. J. (1992). The Illyrians. Blackwell. ISBN 0-631-19807-5.
